= List of awards and nominations received by Westworld =

Awards and nominations received by Westworld
Awards and nominations
Award	Wins	Nominations
American Cinema Editors Awards	0	1
American Society of Cinematographers Awards	0	1
Art Directors Guild Awards	1	1
Black Reel Awards	1	1
Canadian Society of Cinematographers Awards	0	1
Cinema Audio Society Awards	0	3
Costume Designers Guild Awards	1	4
Critics' Choice Super Awards	0	1
Critics' Choice Television Awards	3	1
Directors Guild of America Awards	0	1
Dorian Awards	0	2
Dragon Awards	0	1
Edgar Awards	0	1
Empire Awards	0	1
Golden Globe Awards	0	4
Golden Reel Awards	2	4
Hollywood Critics Association Midseason Awards	0	1
Hollywood Makeup Artist and Hair Stylist Guild Awards	2	1
IGN Awards	2	4
IGN People's Choice Awards	2	4
International Film Music Critics Association Awards	0	1
Location Managers Guild Awards	1	1
Make-Up Artists and Hair Stylists Guild Awards	1	1
NAACP Image Awards	0	1
People's Choice Awards	0	1
Primetime Creative Arts Emmy Awards	8	32
Primetime Emmy Awards	1	13
Producers Guild of America Awards	0	1
Nebula Awards	0	1
Satellite Awards	1	1
Saturn Awards	3	11
Screen Actors Guild Awards	0	5
Society of Operating Cameramen Awards	0	1
Visual Effects Society Awards	0	3
Writers Guild of America Awards	0	2

Totals (Note: Certain award groups do not simply award one winner. They acknowledge several different recipients, have runners-up, and have third place. Since this is a specific recognition and is different from losing an award, runner-up mentions are considered wins in this award tally. For simplification and to avoid errors, each award in this list has been presumed to have had a prior nomination.)
- Wins: 29
- Nominations: 112

Westworld is an American science fiction television series created by Jonathan Nolan and Lisa Joy for HBO, based on the 1973 film of the same name by Michael Crichton. The story takes place in the fictional Westworld, a technologically advanced, Western-themed amusement park populated completely by synthetic androids dubbed "hosts". The park caters to high-paying guests who may indulge their wildest fantasies within the park without fear of retaliation from the hosts, who are prevented by their programming from harming humans.

The series has been a candidate for television awards in a variety of categories recognizing its writing, acting, directing, production, score, and visual effects.

== Awards and nominations ==
Awards and nominations received by Westworld
Award	Year (Note: Indicates the year of ceremony.)	Category	Recipient(s) and nominee(s)	Result	Ref(s)
American Cinema Editors Awards	2017	Best Edited One Hour Series for Non-Commercial Television	Stephen Semel and Marc Jozefowicz (for "The Original")	Nominated	
American Society of Cinematographers Awards	2017	Outstanding Achievement in Cinematography in Movie, Miniseries, or Pilot for Television	Paul Cameron (for "The Original")	Nominated	
American Society of Cinematographers Awards	2022	Outstanding Achievement in Cinematography in an Episode of a One-Hour Television Series – Non-Commercial	John Conroy (for "Années Folles")	Nominated	
Art Directors Guild Awards	2017	Excellence in Production Design for a One-Hour Period or Fantasy Single-Camera Series	Nathan Crowley (for "The Original")	Won	
Art Directors Guild Awards	2021	Excellence in Production Design for a One-Hour Period or Fantasy Single-Camera Series	Howard Cummings (for "Parce Domine")	Nominated	
Black Reel Awards	2020	Outstanding Supporting Actor, Drama Series	Jeffrey Wright	Nominated	
Black Reel Awards	2020	Outstanding Supporting Actress, Drama Series	Thandiwe Newton	Won	
Canadian Society of Cinematographers Awards	2017	TV Series Cinematography	Robert McLachlan (for "Contrapasso")	Nominated	
Cinema Audio Society Awards	2017	Outstanding Achievement in Sound Mixing for Television Series – One Hour	John Pritchett, Keith Rogers, Scott Weber, Mark Kondracki and Geordy Sincavage (for "The Original")	Nominated	
Cinema Audio Society Awards	2019	Outstanding Achievement in Sound Mixing for Television Series – One Hour	Geoffrey Patterson, Roger V. Stevenson, Keith Rogers, Andy King, Scott Weber, Michael Botha and Geordy Sincavage (for "The Passenger")	Nominated	
Cinema Audio Society Awards	2021	Outstanding Achievement in Sound Mixing for Television Series – One Hour	Geoffrey Patterson, Keith A. Rogers, Benjamin L. Cook and Ramin Djawadi (for "The Mother of Exiles")	Nominated	
Costume Designers Guild Awards	2017	Outstanding Period Television Series	Trish Summerville (for "The Original")	Nominated	
Costume Designers Guild Awards	2017	Outstanding Period Television Series	Ane Crabtree	Nominated	
Costume Designers Guild Awards	2021	Excellence in Sci-Fi/Fantasy Television	Shay Cunliffe (for "Parce Domine")	Won	
Costume Designers Guild Awards	2023	Excellence in Sci-Fi/Fantasy Television	Debra Beebe (for "Generation Loss")	Nominated	
Critics' Choice Super Awards	2021	Best Actress in a Science Fiction/Fantasy Series	Thandiwe Newton	Nominated	
Critics' Choice Television Awards	2016	Most Exciting New Series	Westworld	Won	
Critics' Choice Television Awards	2016	Best Drama Series	Westworld	Nominated	
Critics' Choice Television Awards	2016	Best Actress in a Drama Series	Evan Rachel Wood	Won	
Critics' Choice Television Awards	2016	Best Supporting Actress in a Drama Series	Thandiwe Newton	Won	
Directors Guild of America Awards	2017	Outstanding Directing – Dramatic Series	Jonathan Nolan (for "The Original")	Nominated	
Dorian Awards	2017	TV Drama of the Year	Westworld	Nominated	
Dorian Awards	2017	TV Performance of the Year – Actress	Thandiwe Newton	Nominated	
Dragon Awards	2017	Best Science Fiction or Fantasy TV Series	Westworld	Nominated	
Edgar Awards	2017	TV Episode Teleplay	Jonathan Nolan & Lisa Joy (for "The Bicameral Mind")	Nominated	
Empire Awards	2017	Best TV Series	Westworld	Nominated	
Golden Globe Awards	2017	Best Television Series – Drama	Westworld	Nominated	
Golden Globe Awards	2017	Best Actress – Television Series Drama	Evan Rachel Wood	Nominated	
Golden Globe Awards	2017	Best Supporting Actress – Series, Miniseries or Television Film	Thandiwe Newton	Nominated	
Golden Globe Awards	2019	Best Supporting Actress – Series, Miniseries or Television Film	Thandiwe Newton	Nominated	
Golden Reel Awards	2017	Best Sound Editing – Long Form Dialogue and ADR in Television	Thomas E. de Gorter, Matthew Sawelson, Brian Armstrong and Fred Paragano (for "The Bicameral Mind")	Nominated	
Golden Reel Awards	2017	Best Sound Editing – Long Form Sound Effects and Foley in Television	Thomas E. de Gorter, Matthew Sawelson, Geordy Sincavage, Michael Head, Rick Owen, Tara Blume, Mark Allen and Marc Glassman (for "The Bicameral Mind")	Won	
Golden Reel Awards	2017	Best Sound Editing in Television, Short Form: FX/Foley	Thomas E. de Gorter, Matthew Sawelson, Geordy Sincavage, Michael Head, Tara Blume, Rick Owens, Mark R. Allen and Marc Glassman (for "Trompe L'Oeil")	Won	
Golden Reel Awards	2017	Best Sound Editing in Television, Short Form: Dialogue / ADR	Thomas E. de Gorter, Matthew Sawelson, Brian Armstrong and Fred Paragano (for "Trace Decay")	Nominated	
Golden Reel Awards	2021	Outstanding Achievement in Sound Editing – Dialogue and ADR for Episodic Long Form Broadcast Media	Sue Gamsaragan Cahill, Jane Boegel-Koch and Tim Tuchrello (for "The Mother of Exiles")	Nominated	
Golden Reel Awards	2021	Outstanding Achievement in Sound Editing – Sound Effects and Foley for Episodic Long Form Broadcast Media	Sue Gamsaragan Cahill, Benjamin Cook, Shaughnessy Hare, Brendan Croxon and Adrian Medhurst (for "The Mother of Exiles")	Nominated	
Hollywood Critics Association Midseason Awards	2020	Best Cable Network Series (New or Recurring)	Westworld	Nominated	
Hollywood Makeup Artist and Hair Stylist Guild Awards	2017	Best Contemporary Makeup – Television	Christien Tinsley, Elisa Marsh and Rolf Keppler	Won	
Hollywood Makeup Artist and Hair Stylist Guild Awards	2017	Best Period and/or Character Makeup – Television	Christien Tinsley, Myriam Arougheti and Rolf Keppler	Nominated	
Hollywood Makeup Artist and Hair Stylist Guild Awards	2017	Best Special Makeup Effects – Television	Christien Tinsley and Hiroshi Yada	Won	
IGN Awards	2016	Best TV Series	Westworld	Nominated	
IGN Awards	2016	Best New TV Series	Westworld	Nominated	
IGN Awards	2016	Best TV Drama Series	Westworld	Won	
IGN Awards	2016	Best TV Actor	Jeffrey Wright	Nominated	
IGN Awards	2016	Best TV Actress	Evan Rachel Wood	Nominated	
IGN Awards	2016	Best TV Actress	Thandiwe Newton	Won	
IGN People's Choice Awards	2016	Best TV Series	Westworld	Nominated	
IGN People's Choice Awards	2016	Best New TV Series	Westworld	Nominated	
IGN People's Choice Awards	2016	Best TV Drama Series	Westworld	Nominated	
IGN People's Choice Awards	2016	Best TV Actor	Jeffrey Wright	Won	
IGN People's Choice Awards	2016	Best TV Actress	Evan Rachel Wood	Won	
IGN People's Choice Awards	2016	Best TV Actress	Thandiwe Newton	Nominated	
International Film Music Critics Association Awards	2017	Best Original Score for a Television Series	Ramin Djawadi	Nominated	
Location Managers Guild Awards	2017	LMGI Award for Outstanding Locations in Period Television	Mandi Dillin	Won	
Location Managers Guild Awards	2019	Outstanding Locations in Period Television	Mandi Dillin	Nominated	
Make-Up Artists and Hair Stylists Guild Awards	2021	Best Television Series, Limited or Miniseries or New Media Series – Best Contemporary Make-Up	Elisa Marsh, John Damiani, Jennifer Aspinall and Rachel Hoke	Won	
Make-Up Artists and Hair Stylists Guild Awards	2021	Best Special Make-Up Effects in a Television Series, Limited or Miniseries or New Media Series	Justin Raleigh, Chris Hampton and Thom Floutz	Nominated	
NAACP Image Awards	2021	Outstanding Supporting Actor in a Drama Series	Jeffrey Wright	Nominated	
People's Choice Awards	2017	Favorite Premium Sci-Fi/Fantasy Series	Westworld	Nominated	
Primetime Creative Arts Emmy Awards	2017	Outstanding Casting for a Drama Series	John Papsidera	Nominated	
Primetime Creative Arts Emmy Awards	2017	Outstanding Cinematography for a Single-Camera Series (One Hour)	Paul Cameron (for "The Original")	Nominated	
Primetime Creative Arts Emmy Awards	2017	Outstanding Costumes for a Period/Fantasy Series, Limited Series, or Movie	Trish Summerville, Jo Kissack Folsom and Lynda Foote (for "The Original")	Nominated	
Primetime Creative Arts Emmy Awards	2017	Outstanding Creative Achievement in Interactive Media within a Scripted Program	Westworld	Won	
Primetime Creative Arts Emmy Awards	2017	Outstanding Hairstyling for a Single-Camera Series	Joy Zapata, Pavy Olivarez, Bruce Samia and Donna Anderson (for "Contrapasso")	Won	
Primetime Creative Arts Emmy Awards	2017	Outstanding Main Title Design	Patrick Clair, Raoul Marks, Yongsub Song, Felix Soletic, Jessica Hurst and Jose Limon	Nominated	
Primetime Creative Arts Emmy Awards	2017	Outstanding Main Title Theme Music	Ramin Djawadi	Nominated	
Primetime Creative Arts Emmy Awards	2017	Outstanding Makeup for a Single-Camera Series (Non-Prosthetic)	Christien Tinsley, Myriam Arougheti, Gerald Quist, Lydia Milars and Ed French (for "The Original")	Won	
Primetime Creative Arts Emmy Awards	2017	Outstanding Prosthetic Makeup for a Series, Limited Series, Movie, or Special	Christien Tinsley, Hiroshi Yada, Georgia Allen, Gerald Quist and Myriam Arougheti (for "The Original")	Nominated	
Primetime Creative Arts Emmy Awards	2017	Outstanding Single-Camera Picture Editing for a Drama Series	Andrew Seklir (for "The Bicameral Mind")	Nominated	
Primetime Creative Arts Emmy Awards	2017	Outstanding Production Design for a Narrative Contemporary or Fantasy Program (One Hour or More)	Zack Grobler, Steve Christensen and Julie Ochipinti (for "The Bicameral Mind")	Nominated	
Primetime Creative Arts Emmy Awards	2017	Outstanding Production Design for a Narrative Contemporary or Fantasy Program (One Hour or More)	Nathan Crowley, Naaman Marshall and Julie Ochipinti (for "The Original")	Nominated	
Primetime Creative Arts Emmy Awards	2017	Outstanding Sound Editing for a Series	Thomas E. Matthew Sawelson, Brian Armstrong, Fred Paragano, Mark Allen, Marc Glassman, Sebastian Visconti, Geordy Sincavage, Michael Head, Christopher Kaller, Rick Owens and Tara Blume Norton (for "The Bicameral Mind")	Nominated	
Primetime Creative Arts Emmy Awards	2017	Outstanding Sound Mixing for a Comedy or Drama Series (One-Hour)	Keith Rogers, Scott Weber, Roger Stevenson and Kyle O'Neal (for "The Bicameral Mind")	Won	
Primetime Creative Arts Emmy Awards	2017	Outstanding Special Visual Effects	Jay Worth, Elizabeth Castro, Joe Wehmeyer, Eric Levin-Hatz, Bobo Skipper, Gustav Ahren, Paul Ghezzo, Mitchell S. Drain and Michael Lantieri (for "The Bicameral Mind")	Won	
Primetime Creative Arts Emmy Awards	2018	Outstanding Guest Actor in a Drama Series	Jimmi Simpson (for "Reunion")	Nominated	
Primetime Creative Arts Emmy Awards	2018	Outstanding Casting for a Drama Series	John Papsidera	Nominated	
Primetime Creative Arts Emmy Awards	2018	Outstanding Cinematography for a Single-Camera Series (One Hour)	John Grillo (for "The Riddle of the Sphinx")	Nominated	
Primetime Creative Arts Emmy Awards	2018	Outstanding Fantasy/Sci-Fi Costumes	Sharen Davis, Charlene Amateau, Jodie Stern and Sandy Kenyon (for "Akane no Mai")	Nominated	
Primetime Creative Arts Emmy Awards	2018	Outstanding Hairstyling for a Single-Camera Series	Joy Zapata, Lori McCoy Bell; Dawn Victoria Dudley, Karen Zanki, Connie Kallos and Norma Lee (for "Akane no Mai")	Won	
Primetime Creative Arts Emmy Awards	2018	Outstanding Interactive Program Within A Scripted Program	Chaos Takes Control Interactive Experience	Won	
Primetime Creative Arts Emmy Awards	2018	Outstanding Main Title Design	Patrick Clair, Raoul Marks, Jose Limon and Savva Tsekmes	Nominated	
Primetime Creative Arts Emmy Awards	2018	Outstanding Makeup for a Single-Camera Series (Non-Prosthetic)	Elisa Marsh, Allan A. Apone, Rachel Hoke, John Damiani, Ron Pipes and Ken Diaz (for "Akane no Mai")	Won	
Primetime Creative Arts Emmy Awards	2018	Outstanding Prosthetic Makeup for a Series, Limited Series, Movie or Special	Justin Raleigh, Kevin Kirkpatrick, Thom Floutz, Chris Hampton, Bryan Blair, Michael Ezell and Steve Koch (for "The Riddle of the Sphinx")	Nominated	
Primetime Creative Arts Emmy Awards	2018	Outstanding Music Composition for a Series	Ramin Djawadi (for "Akane no Mai")	Nominated	
Primetime Creative Arts Emmy Awards	2018	Outstanding Music Supervision	Sean O'Meara (for "Akane no Mai")	Nominated	
Primetime Creative Arts Emmy Awards	2018	Outstanding Production Design for a Narrative Contemporary Program (One Hour or More)	Nathan Crowley, Steve Christensen and Julie Ochipinti (for "Akane no Mai")	Nominated	
Primetime Creative Arts Emmy Awards	2018	Outstanding Sound Editing for a Comedy or Drama Series (One-Hour)	Thomas E. deGorter, Brett Hinton, Chris Kahwaty, Fred Paragano, Brian Armstrong, Mark Allen, Marc Glassman, Allegra De Souza, Christopher Kaller, Michael Head, Jordan McClain, Geordy Sincavage, Tara Blume, Matt Salib and Rick Owens (for "Akane no Mai")	Nominated	
Primetime Creative Arts Emmy Awards	2018	Outstanding Sound Mixing for a Comedy or Drama Series (One-Hour)	Andy King, Keith Rogers and Geoffrey Patterson (for "Akane no Mai")	Nominated	
Primetime Creative Arts Emmy Awards	2018	Outstanding Special Visual Effects	Jay Worth, Jacqueline VandenBussche, Bruce Branit, Kama Moiha, Michelle H. Pak, Bobo Skipper, Niklas Nuyqvist, Nhat Phong Tran and Mike Enriquez (for "The Passenger")	Nominated	
Primetime Creative Arts Emmy Awards	2018	Outstanding Stunt Coordination for a Drama Series, Limited Series, or Movie	Doug Coleman and Brian Machleit	Nominated	
Primetime Creative Arts Emmy Awards	2020	Outstanding Cinematography for a Single-Camera Series (One Hour)	Paul Cameron (for "Parce Domine")	Nominated	
Primetime Creative Arts Emmy Awards	2020	Outstanding Fantasy/Sci-Fi Costumes	Shay Cunliffe, Dan Bronson, Amanda Riley and Jo Kissack Folsom (for "Parce Domine")	Nominated	
Primetime Creative Arts Emmy Awards	2020	Outstanding Interactive Extension of a Linear Program	Free Will Is Not Free Interactive Experience	Nominated	
Primetime Creative Arts Emmy Awards	2020	Outstanding Main Title Design	Patrick Clair, Pinar Yanadarg Delul, Raoul Marks and Lance Slaton	Nominated	
Primetime Creative Arts Emmy Awards	2020	Outstanding Prosthetic Makeup for a Series, Limited Series, Movie or Special	Justin Raleigh, Chris Hampton and Thom Floutz (for "Crisis Theory")	Nominated	
Primetime Creative Arts Emmy Awards	2020	Outstanding Production Design for a Narrative Period or Fantasy Program (One Hour or More)	Howard Cummings, Jon Carlos and Julie Ochipinti (for "Parce Domine")	Nominated	
Primetime Creative Arts Emmy Awards	2020	Outstanding Sound Editing for a Comedy or Drama Series (One-Hour)	Sue Gamsaragan Cahill, Benjamin L. Cook, Shaughnessy Hare, Jane Boegel-Koch, Tim Tuchrello, Sara Bencivenga, Brendan Croxon, Adrian Medhurst and Christopher Kaller (for "Parce Domine")	Nominated	
Primetime Creative Arts Emmy Awards	2020	Outstanding Sound Mixing for a Comedy or Drama Series (One Hour)	Geoffrey Patterson, Keith Rogers and Benjamin L. Cook (for "Parce Domine")	Nominated	
Primetime Creative Arts Emmy Awards	2020	Outstanding Special Visual Effects	Jay Worth, Martin Hernblad, Jeremy Fernsler, Nhat Phong Tran, Joe Wehmeyer, Bruce Branit, Octevia Robertson, Jacqueline VandenBussche and Sebastiano D’Aprile (for "Crisis Theory")	Nominated	
Primetime Emmy Awards	2017	Outstanding Drama Series	J. J. Abrams, Jonathan Nolan, Lisa Joy, Bryan Burk, Athena Wickham, Kathy Lingg, Richard J. Lewis, Roberto Patino, Katherine Lingenfelter and Cherylanne Martin	Nominated	
Primetime Emmy Awards	2017	Outstanding Lead Actor in a Drama Series	Anthony Hopkins (for "Trompe L'Oeil")	Nominated	
Primetime Emmy Awards	2017	Outstanding Lead Actress in a Drama Series	Evan Rachel Wood (for "The Bicameral Mind")	Nominated	
Primetime Emmy Awards	2017	Outstanding Supporting Actor in a Drama Series	Jeffrey Wright (for "The Well-Tempered Clavier")	Nominated	
Primetime Emmy Awards	2017	Outstanding Supporting Actress in a Drama Series	Thandiwe Newton (for "Trace Decay")	Nominated	
Primetime Emmy Awards	2017	Outstanding Directing for a Drama Series	Jonathan Nolan (for "The Bicameral Mind")	Nominated	
Primetime Emmy Awards	2017	Outstanding Writing for a Drama Series	Lisa Joy and Jonathan Nolan (for "The Bicameral Mind")	Nominated	
Primetime Emmy Awards	2018	Outstanding Drama Series	Westworld	Nominated	
Primetime Emmy Awards	2018	Outstanding Lead Actor in a Drama Series	Ed Harris	Nominated	
Primetime Emmy Awards	2018	Outstanding Lead Actor in a Drama Series	Jeffrey Wright	Nominated	
Primetime Emmy Awards	2018	Outstanding Lead Actress in a Drama Series	Evan Rachel Wood	Nominated	
Primetime Emmy Awards	2018	Outstanding Supporting Actress in a Drama Series	Thandiwe Newton (for "Akane no Mai")	Won	
Primetime Emmy Awards	2020	Outstanding Supporting Actor in a Drama Series	Jeffrey Wright (for "Crisis Theory")	Nominated	
Primetime Emmy Awards	2020	Outstanding Supporting Actress in a Drama Series	Thandiwe Newton (for "The Winter Line")	Nominated	
Producers Guild of America Awards	2017	Episodic Television, Drama	J. J. Abrams, Jonathan Nolan, Lisa Joy, Bryan Burk, Athena Wickham, Kathy Lingg, Richard J. Lewis, Roberto Patino, Katherine Lingenfelter and Cherylanne Martin	Nominated	
Nebula Awards	2017	Ray Bradbury Nebula Award for Outstanding Dramatic Presentation	Jonathan Nolan and Lisa Joy (for "The Bicameral Mind")	Nominated	
Satellite Awards	2017	Best Television Series – Genre	Westworld	Nominated	
Satellite Awards	2017	Best Actress – Television Series Drama	Evan Rachel Wood	Won	
Saturn Awards	2017	Best Science Fiction Television Series	Westworld	Won	
Saturn Awards	2017	Best Supporting Actor on Television	Ed Harris	Won	
Saturn Awards	2017	Best Supporting Actor on Television	Jeffrey Wright	Nominated	
Saturn Awards	2017	Best Supporting Actress on Television	Thandiwe Newton	Nominated	
Saturn Awards	2017	Best Supporting Actress on Television	Evan Rachel Wood	Nominated	
Saturn Awards	2017	Best Guest Performance on a Television Series	Anthony Hopkins	Nominated	
Saturn Awards	2018	Best DVD/BD Television Series Release	Season One: The Maze	Nominated	
Saturn Awards	2019	Best Science Fiction Television Series	Westworld	Won	
Saturn Awards	2019	Best Actor on Television	Jeffrey Wright	Nominated	
Saturn Awards	2019	Best Supporting Actor on Television	Ed Harris	Nominated	
Saturn Awards	2021	Best Science Fiction Television Series	Westworld	Nominated	
Saturn Awards	2021	Best Actress on Television	Thandiwe Newton	Nominated	
Saturn Awards	2021	Best Supporting Actress on Television	Tessa Thompson	Nominated	
Saturn Awards	2022	Best Science Fiction Television Series	Westworld	Nominated	
Screen Actors Guild Awards	2017	Outstanding Performance by an Ensemble in a Drama Series	Ben Barnes, Ingrid Bolsø Berdal, Ed Harris, Luke Hemsworth, Anthony Hopkins, Sidse Babett Knudsen, James Marsden, Leonardo Nam, Thandiwe Newton, Talulah Riley, Rodrigo Santoro, Angela Sarafyan, Jimmi Simpson, Ptolemy Slocum, Evan Rachel Wood, Shannon Woodward and Jeffrey Wright	Nominated	
Screen Actors Guild Awards	2017	Outstanding Performance by a Female Actor in a Drama Series	Thandiwe Newton	Nominated	
Screen Actors Guild Awards	2017	Outstanding Performance by a Stunt Ensemble in a Television Series	Westworld	Nominated	
Screen Actors Guild Awards	2019	Outstanding Performance by a Stunt Ensemble in a Television Series	Westworld	Nominated	
Screen Actors Guild Awards	2021	Outstanding Performance by a Stunt Ensemble in a Comedy or Drama Series	Westworld	Nominated	
Society of Operating Cameramen Awards	2017	Camera Operator of the Year – Television	Steven Matzinger and Greg Smith	Nominated	
Visual Effects Society Awards	2017	Outstanding Visual Effects in a Photoreal Episode	Jay Worth, Elizabeth Castro, Bobo Skipper and Gustav Ahrén (for "The Bicameral Mind")	Nominated	
Visual Effects Society Awards	2019	Outstanding Visual Effects in a Photoreal Episode	Jay Worth, Elizabeth Castro, Bruce Branit, Joe Wehmeyer and Michael Lantieri (for "The Passenger")	Nominated	
Visual Effects Society Awards	2021	Outstanding Visual Effects in a Photoreal Episode	Jay Worth, Elizabeth Castro, Bruce Branit, Joe Wehmeyer and Mark Byers (for "Crisis Theory")	Nominated	
Writers Guild of America Awards	2017	Dramatic Series	Ed Brubaker, Bridget Carpenter, Dan Dietz, Halley Gross, Lisa Joy, Katherine Lingenfelter, Dominic Mitchell, Jonathan Nolan, Roberto Patino, Daniel T. Thomsen and Charles Yu	Nominated	
Writers Guild of America Awards	2017	New Series	Ed Brubaker, Bridget Carpenter, Dan Dietz, Halley Gross, Lisa Joy, Katherine Lingenfelter, Dominic Mitchell, Jonathan Nolan, Roberto Patino, Daniel T. Thomsen and Charles Yu	Nominated	
