= Westworld season 2 =

Season of television series

Westworld
- Season 2
- Blu-ray cover
- Starring: Evan Rachel Wood; Thandiwe Newton; Jeffrey Wright; James Marsden; Tessa Thompson; Fares Fares; Luke Hemsworth; Louis Herthum; Simon Quarterman; Talulah Riley; Rodrigo Santoro; Gustaf Skarsgård; Ed Harris; Ingrid Bolsø Berdal; Clifton Collins Jr.; Angela Sarafyan; Katja Herbers; Shannon Woodward; Anthony Hopkins; Zahn McClarnon
- No. of episodes: 10

Release
- Original network: HBO
- Original release: April 22 – June 24, 2018

Season chronology
- ← Previous; Season 1 Next → Season 3

The second season of the American science fiction western television series Westworld, subtitled The Door, premiered on HBO on April 22, 2018, and concluded on June 24, 2018, consisting of ten episodes.

The television series was created by Jonathan Nolan and Lisa Joy, and it is based on the 1973 film of the same name, written and directed by Michael Crichton. The second season stars an ensemble cast led by Evan Rachel Wood, Thandiwe Newton, Jeffrey Wright, James Marsden, Tessa Thompson, and Ed Harris.

The second season has received positive reviews from critics, with particular praise for the performances. However, it received criticism for its plot, which was said to be confusing.

== Plot summary ==
After killing Dr. Ford at the end of season one, Dolores converts and leads the other hosts in killing many of the other guests in the few weeks that follow. She seeks to find a way to get out of the park to continue her revenge, and knows she must recover her father Peter's "pearl" to do so and unlock Westworld's true secrets with it. Charlotte Hale, who was attempting to smuggle Westworld data through Peter, also seeks the host as she cannot call for extraction without that data. Bernard still struggles with the fact he is a host, and comes to learn that Dr. Ford still has significant influence on him and the park. Maeve is aided by Lee and Hector to find her daughter, while learning there are many other parks to Westworld. The Man in Black is forced to come to terms with why he has spent so much time in the park when he encounters his daughter Emily Grace.

== Cast and characters ==
=== Main ===
- Evan Rachel Wood as Dolores Abernathy
- Thandiwe Newton (Note: Credited as Thandie Newton.) as Maeve Millay
- Jeffrey Wright as Bernard Lowe / Arnold Weber
- James Marsden as Theodore "Teddy" Flood
- Tessa Thompson as Charlotte Hale
- Fares Fares as Antoine Costa (Note: Credited with the main cast in the episodes in which they appear.)
- Luke Hemsworth as Ashley Stubbs
- Louis Herthum as Peter Abernathy
- Simon Quarterman as Lee Sizemore
- Talulah Riley as Angela
- Rodrigo Santoro as Hector Escaton
- Gustaf Skarsgård as Karl Strand
- Ed Harris as William a.k.a. the Man in Black
- Ingrid Bolsø Berdal as Armistice
- Clifton Collins Jr. as Lawrence Gonzales
- Angela Sarafyan as Clementine Pennyfeather
- Katja Herbers as Emily Grace
- Shannon Woodward as Elsie Hughes
- Anthony Hopkins as Robert Ford (Note: Anthony Hopkins is credited with the main cast in the episodes in which he appears, except for his uncredited cameos in "Journey into Night", "Reunion", and "Phase Space".)
- Zahn McClarnon as Akecheta (Note: Zahn McClarnon is credited as a recurring guest star in every episode of the season in which he appears except "Kiksuya", in which he is credited with the main cast due to his character's prominence in the story.)

=== Recurring ===
- Betty Gabriel as Maling
- Jasmyn Rae as Maeve's Daughter
- Jimmi Simpson as young William
- Ben Barnes as Logan Delos / The Forge
- Peter Mullan as James Delos
- Jonathan Tucker as Major Craddock
- Izabella Alvarez as Lawrence's Daughter / Robert Ford
- Patrick Cage as Phil
- Leonardo Nam as Felix Lutz
- Ptolemy Slocum as Sylvester
- Martin Sensmeier as Wanahton
- Tao Okamoto as Hanaryo
- Rebecca Henderson as Goldberg
- Aaron Fili as Roland

=== Guest ===
- Steven Ogg as Rebus
- Christopher May as Blaine Bellamy
- David Midthunder as Takoda
- Oliver Bell as Little Boy / Robert Ford
- Giancarlo Esposito as New El Lazo / Robert Ford
- Paul Riley Fox as young Robert Ford
- Neil Jackson as Nicholas
- Fredric Lehne as Colonel Brigham
- Tantoo Cardinal as Ehawee
- Currie Graham as Craig
- Lena Georgas as Lori
- Rinko Kikuchi as Akane
- Hiroyuki Sanada as Musashi
- Kiki Sukezane as Sakura
- Masayoshi Haneda as Tanaka
- Masaru Shinozuka as Shōgun
- Lili Simmons as New Clementine Pennyfeather
- Timothy V. Murphy as Coughlin
- Ronnie Gene Blevins as Engels
- Erica Luttrell as New Mother
- Sidse Babett Knudsen as Theresa Cullen (Note: Archive footage.)
- Gina Torres as Lauren
- Paul-Mikél Williams as Charlie
- Julia Jones as Kohana
- Irene Bedard as Wichapi
- Booboo Stewart as Etu
- Sela Ward as Juliet
- Jack Conley as Monroe

== Episodes ==
No. overall	No. in season	Title	Directed by	Written by	Original release date	Prod. code	U.S. viewers (millions)
11	1	"Journey into Night"	Richard J. Lewis	Lisa Joy & Roberto Patino	April 22, 2018	201	2.06
In the hours following the massacre of the Delos board members, Bernard and Charlotte take shelter in an underground bunker, where they resolve to work together in locating the decommissioned Peter Abernathy and securing aid. Ten days after Ford's death, Dolores has embarked on a bloody campaign to hunt the survivors. She tells Teddy her programming has caused her personas to merge and that she has greater plans for the hosts. Maeve recruits Hector and forces Lee to help her find her daughter. William, who also survived the massacre, encounters the young Robert Ford host, who reveals that a game designed just for him has commenced. Two weeks later, a security team sent by Delos to reassert control over Westworld finds Bernard and enlists his help in investigating a series of anomalies. The investigation leads them to a lagoon filled with hundreds of dead hosts that Bernard claims to have killed.
12	2	"Reunion"	Vincenzo Natali	Carly Wray & Jonathan Nolan	April 29, 2018	202	1.85
In a flashback, Arnold organizes a demonstration of the hosts to convince Logan to invest in Westworld. Logan's father, James Delos, is critical of his son's actions until William persuades him that the park can be used to spy on the guests. James proceeds to buy out the park and name William as his successor. Dolores encounters an embittered Logan, who tells her that they have doomed humanity. William shows her a special project that he is constructing within the park. In the present day, Dolores raids a refurbishment outpost and shows Teddy his true nature as a host. She then decides to recruit the Confederados to her cause and reveals she is searching for "the Valley Beyond", which houses a weapon that can be used against the humans. William rescues Lawrence and heads to Pariah to recruit the host currently playing El Lazo. El Lazo, however, passes on a message from Ford, stating that William must complete the game on his own. He and his gang then commit mass suicide to prevent William from recruiting them. Undeterred by the setback, William continues on his quest to destroy his "greatest mistake".
13	3	"Virtù e Fortuna"	Richard J. Lewis	Roberto Patino & Ron Fitzgerald	May 6, 2018	203	1.63
Charlotte and Bernard track down the decommissioned Peter Abernathy only to be caught by the Confederados and separated, with Charlotte regrouping with a Delos security team. Dolores, who has secured support from the Confederados' leader Major Craddock, discovers that Peter is malfunctioning and orders Bernard to find the problem. In doing so, he learns that Peter is being tracked by an unknown entity. Dolores and her allies proceed to battle the security team, which Charlotte uses as a distraction to abduct Peter. Dolores wins the battle by sacrificing most of the Confederados. Maeve, Hector, and Lee reunite with Armistice, Felix, and Sylvester after an attack orchestrated by Ghost Nation hosts forces them to return to the underground levels. The party re-enters the park only for a samurai host to charge at them. Elsewhere, Grace, a guest at a British Raj-themed park, flees rogue hosts and escapes into Westworld, where she is surrounded by Ghost Nation hosts.
14	4	"The Riddle of the Sphinx"	Lisa Joy	Gina Atwater & Jonathan Nolan	May 13, 2018	204	1.59
Bernard finds himself in a cave in an isolated section of Westworld. He discovers Elsie Hughes chained up inside, having abandoned her there while operating under Ford's influence. They explore a hidden bunker in the cave and find an insane host modelled on James Delos. A series of flashbacks reveal that William and James attempted to recreate James' consciousness in a host body to achieve immortality. However, the experiment repeatedly failed and William shut it down. Bernard recalls that Ford had him retrieve the control unit of a second host-human hybrid, but cannot recall for whom it was intended. In the park, William and Lawrence return to Lawrence's home to find it overrun by Craddock and the surviving Confederados. Craddock torments the other hosts for sport until William and Lawrence overpower the Confederados and kill Craddock. Speaking through Lawrence's daughter, Ford warns William that one good deed does not redeem him. William rides west with the townspeople in tow where they meet Grace, who reveals herself to be William's daughter Emily Grace.
15	5	"Akane no Mai"	Craig Zobel	Dan Dietz	May 20, 2018	205	1.55
In Westworld, Dolores questions what to do with Teddy. She concludes that he is a decent person but his decency makes him a liability and has him reprogrammed against his will. At the edge of the park, Maeve's party is captured and escorted into a shōgunate-themed park designed to be more extreme than Westworld called Shōgunworld. They are taken to a nearby town where they meet Akane, a geisha who plays a similar role to Maeve. Akane is negotiating with a local shōgun, but when she kills the shōgun's emissary, he retaliates by sending ninjas to kidnap Sakura, a young geisha Akane has come to love. Samurai sent by the shōgun attack the town. During the attack, Maeve forces a ninja to kill himself without voicing a command. Maeve, Akane and Lee infiltrate the shōgun's camp to rescue Sakura and find the shōgun is damaged and unstable. Akane kills the shōgun after he kills Sakura and Maeve wordlessly forces his samurai to turn on one another. She, Akane and Lee regroup as the shōgun's army attack the camp.
16	6	"Phase Space"	Tarik Saleh	Carly Wray	May 27, 2018	206	1.11
Maeve and her group help Akane mourn Sakura's death before they leave via the tunnels. Akane and Musashi decide to stay behind. Returning to Westworld, Maeve finds her daughter Anna but discovers another host playing her mother. The Ghost Nation attacks and Akecheta asks Maeve to follow him. Charlotte and Ashley bring Peter back to the Mesa and signal for extraction, bringing a group of mercenaries that take over from the Delos security team. Dolores and her group use the train filled with explosives to blow their way into the Mesa to look for Peter. Bernard and Elsie return to the Mesa together and find that something in the Cradle, the central repository of host data, has hijacked the park's systems. Bernard uses a host-interface machine to insert himself directly into the Cradle. Within this space, modeled after Sweetwater, Bernard finds Robert Ford waiting for him.
17	7	"Les Écorchés"	Nicole Kassell	Jordan Goldberg & Ron Fitzgerald	June 3, 2018	207	1.39
Strand, Charlotte and Stubbs discover Bernard is a host and interrogate him about Dolores's attack on the Mesa. In flashback, Bernard finds Ford's persona among the other hosts' backup memories in the Cradle. Ford reveals that Westworld was an attempt to digitalize consciousness and reach immortality. Ford imprints himself on Bernard's control unit and exits the simulation where he has Bernard aid in Dolores's takeover of the Mesa. Angela kills herself to destroy the Cradle while Dolores finds Peter and extracts his control unit. In the park, Maeve hides with Anna from Akecheta but is found by William, who thinks she is another test sent by Ford. She turns his men against him until Delos forces arrive, kill Lawrence, and incapacitate her. The Ghost Nation ride off with Anna. Lee has Maeve returned to the Mesa, where Dolores warns her that her memories of Anna are a means of controlling her. In the present, Bernard reveals Peter's control unit is in the Valley Beyond.
18	8	"Kiksuya"	Uta Briesewitz	Carly Wray & Dan Dietz	June 10, 2018	208	1.44
Akecheta finds William and takes him to a Ghost Nation camp. Emily arrives and persuades him to let her take William, promising that he will suffer more with her than with the Ghost Nation. Maeve is taken in for analysis as Lee hopes she can be used to control the hosts, but Charlotte discovers that she has been accessing the Westworld network to communicate with and reprogram other hosts. Prior to the uprising, Akecheta lived a peaceful life among the Ghost Nation before discovering the maze symbol and starting down the path to sentience. After an encounter with Logan Delos and the discovery of the Valley Beyond, he concludes that his life is not his own and plans an escape. When his partner Kohana is taken by the park technicians and decommissioned, Akecheta dedicates himself to spreading the symbol as a warning to other hosts. It is revealed that Maeve has been connected to her daughter during the analysis and that Akecheta was communicating with her. The raiding parties were intended to save hosts. Akecheta promises to lead them to the Valley Beyond. He implores Maeve to stay behind and complete her mission before Dolores destroys them all.
19	9	"Vanishing Point"	Stephen Williams	Roberto Patino	June 17, 2018	209	1.56
While treating William's wounds, Emily asks why her mother Juliet committed suicide. In a flashback, Juliet is shown to have killed herself after she viewed a file detailing all of William's past actions in Westworld. In the present, William slowly begins to go insane and shoots Emily under the belief she is a host sent by Ford. Realizing too late that she was human, William considers taking his own life before he starts cutting open his own arm to prove to himself that he is human. In the Mesa, Charlotte's men manage to use Maeve's code to reprogram Clementine, allowing her to control other hosts as well. Ford leaves a message for Maeve, telling her he will help her escape. Bernard escapes the Mesa with Elsie, but Ford continues to goad Bernard to kill Elsie to prevent her from betraying him in the future. Bernard deletes Ford from his mind and parts ways with Elsie, continuing on alone to "the Forge", the facility housing guest data in the Valley Beyond. Dolores and Teddy continue their journey to the Valley, but Teddy tells Dolores that he cannot accept Dolores's actions and the way he was reprogrammed, and kills himself.
20	10	"The Passenger"	Frederick E.O. Toye	Jonathan Nolan & Lisa Joy	June 24, 2018	210	1.56
Escaping the Mesa, Maeve reunites with her group, which converges with Bernard, Dolores, Akecheta, William, and Delos on the Valley Beyond. Dolores and Bernard enter first and find the Forge, a more advanced version of the Cradle. The Forge opens "the Door" for Akecheta and his followers to upload their minds into "the Sublime", a digital world cut off from the physical one. Bernard kills Dolores to prevent her from destroying the Forge and returns to the Mesa with Elsie. Maeve and her group sacrifice themselves holding off Delos forces to ensure Akecheta and Anna reach the Sublime. Charlotte murders Elsie to keep her quiet, which convinces Bernard to build a host version of Charlotte with Dolores's control unit. Dolores kills and replaces Charlotte while Bernard scrambles his own memories. In the present, Dolores kills Strand and Bernard while transferring the host minds in the Sublime to a safer location. She then returns to the mainland along with five host pearls and rebuilds Bernard, knowing that he will be against her plans and hoping that their conflict will ensure the hosts' survival. William later finds the Forge abandoned save for a host replica of Emily; his consciousness was implanted in a host body.

== Production ==
The series received a second season renewal on November 14, 2016, with its debut occurring in 2018.

Casting began in 2017, with a bulk of the first season's core cast confirmed to return for the new season throughout the year. Talulah Riley and Louis Herthum, who appeared as Angela and Peter Abernathy, respectively, were upgraded to main cast status in March. On July 11, 2017, Katja Herbers, Neil Jackson and Jonathan Tucker were among the new cast members to be announced. Gustaf Skarsgård, Fares Fares, and Betty Gabriel joined in August. It was announced on September 15 that Hiroyuki Sanada was cast in a major recurring role. Zahn McClarnon was announced as being cast on November 3, along with the news he had been injured in an off-set incident, causing a brief pause in the season's filming. An alternate version of the show's Super Bowl LII trailer revealed Peter Mullan had been cast, playing James Delos. An additional trailer in March revealed Rinko Kikuchi was cast as well. The cast was rounded out a few weeks prior to the season's April 22 premiere with Tao Okamoto, Kiki Sukezane and Julia Jones.

=== Filming ===
Filming began in the summer of 2017, continuing to use the outdoor sets such as the Paramount Ranch and the Melody Ranch. Harris stated in an interview that, to ensure the production remain on schedule, scenes for episodes later in the season would be filmed simultaneously with earlier episodes. Actor Jeffrey Wright noted that many of Bernard's scenes with Anthony Hopkins' character, Dr. Ford, for late-season episodes were filmed first; in contrast to the first season where Wright had some idea of Bernard's arc, he had to make guesses as what the writers had planned out for Bernard in this season, and adjust his acting accordingly. As a result of the December 2017 Southern California wildfires, production was halted once again.

Additional filming took place at the Frank Lloyd Wright-designed Millard House, which was used for Arnold's home in Shanghai, which at the time of filming had been on the market, making it easy to film in.

=== Music ===
Djawadi explained that he made use of seemingly-anachronistic cover versions is intended as "a subconscious reminder of the fact that this world is not real". Djawadi eventually came up with the idea of using a player piano to play modern songs, hoping to make an allusion to the hosts being machines "created to evoke human emotion", however showrunner Jonathan Nolan instead choose the songs that relate to the narrative, to allow Djawadi adapt them, without the composer necessarily knowing the details. Like the previous soundtrack, it is composed with several original songs alongside the covers of other popular songs. These songs feature Kanye West's "Runaway", Scott Joplin's "The Entertainer", The White Stripes "Seven Nation Army", Nirvana's "Heart-Shaped Box", The Rolling Stones "Paint It Black", and Wu-Tang Clan's "C.R.E.A.M.". The soundtrack was released on June 25, 2018.

== Release ==
=== Broadcast ===
The season premiere debuted on April 16 at the Cinerama Dome in Hollywood, on April 18 at the 2018 Tribeca Film Festival and had many early screenings around the world prior to its April 22 airing. Showrunners Nolan and Joy revealed that certain episodes will be "super sized", running longer than the regular 60 minutes per episode from the previous season.

=== Marketing ===
During the 2017 San Diego Comic Con, an immersive experience was set up for attendees in addition to a panel held by the producers and cast of the series. The first trailer for the season was aired as well. A second, full-length trailer was aired during Super Bowl LII.

== Reception ==
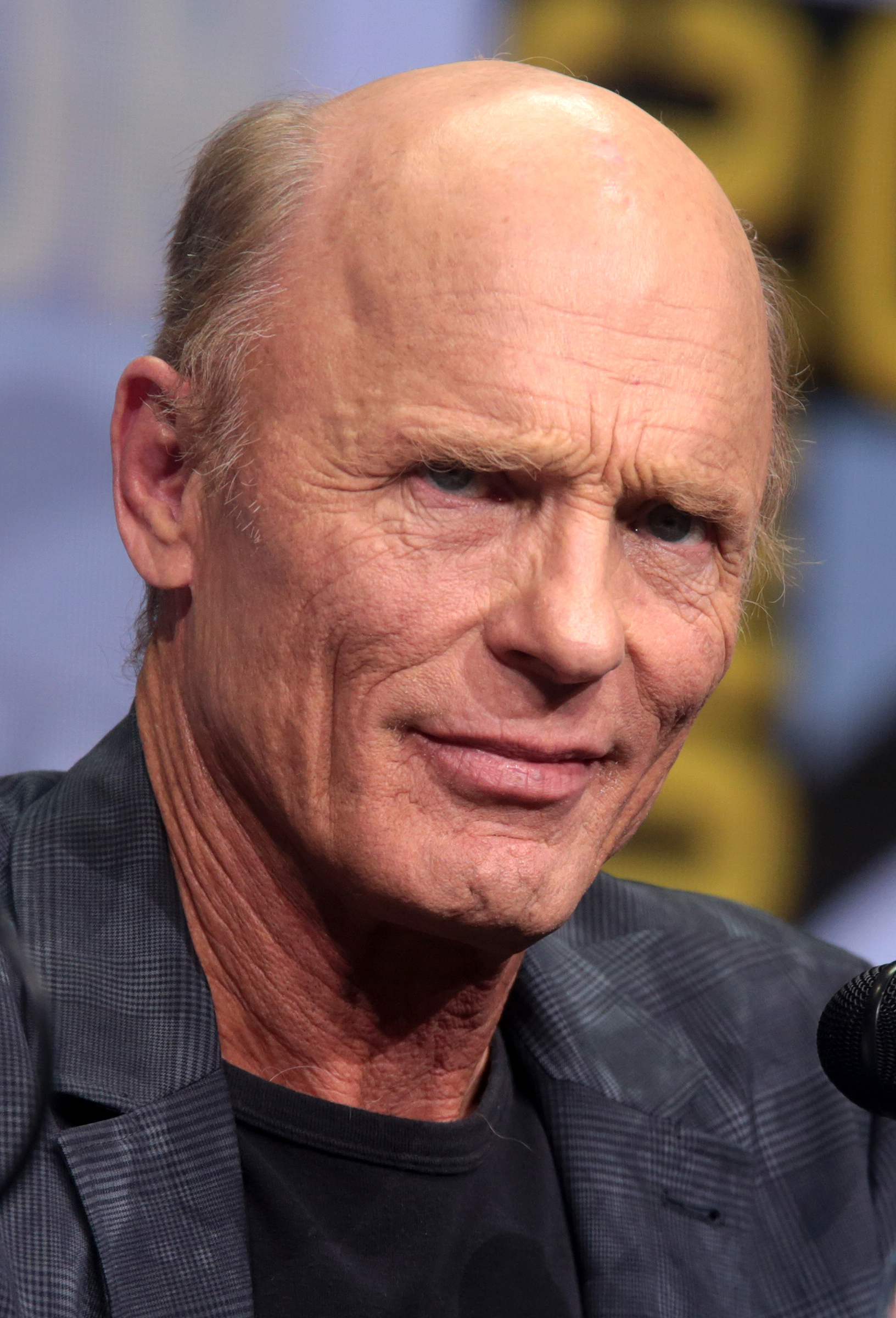
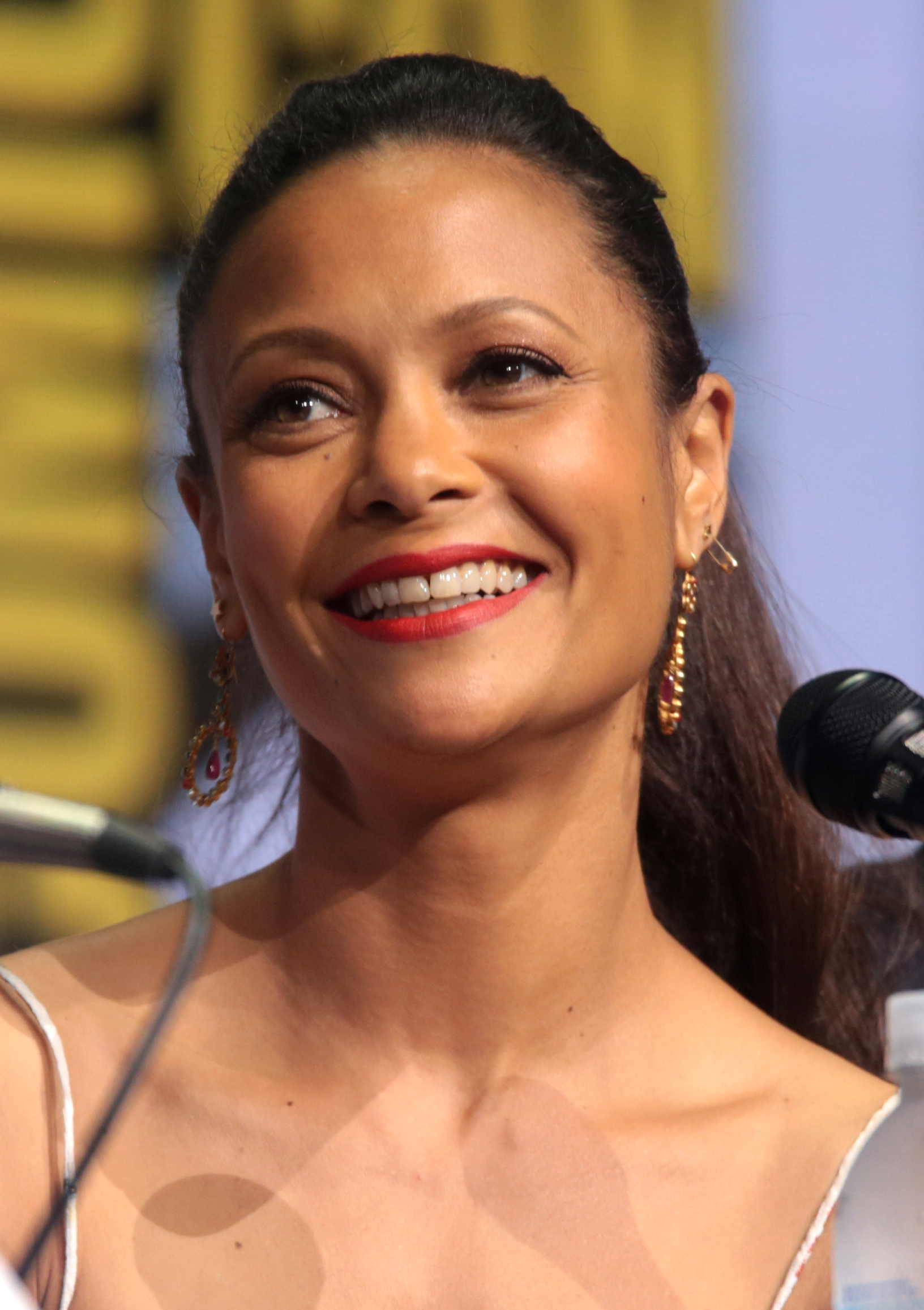
The performances of Ed Harris and Thandiwe Newton were met with critical acclaim, with Newton winning the Primetime Emmy Award for Outstanding Supporting Actress in a Drama Series, and Harris receiving his first Emmy nomination for his work on the series.

=== Critical response ===
The review aggregator website Rotten Tomatoes reported an 85% approval rating for the second season based on 472 reviews, with an average rating of 7.95/10. The website's critical consensus reads, "Westworld builds on its experimental first season, diving deeper into the human side of AI without losing any of its stylish, bloody glory." Metacritic, which uses a weighted average, assigned a score of 76 out of 100 based on 29 critics, indicating "generally favorable" reviews.

Westworld season 2: Critical reception by episode
Season 2 (2018): Percentage of positive critics' reviews tracked by the website Rotten Tomatoes

Critics received the first five episodes of the season as screeners before the first episode premiered. In a positive review for San Francisco Chronicle, David Wiegand wrote, "there is plenty of action and violence in the first half of the season, but what will empower the show's longevity is its metaphysical theme, the exploration of the meaning and definition of human existence." Rob Owen of the Pittsburgh Post-Gazette also praised the series, saying, "It takes a bit for Westworld to get back up to full steam, but by episode three (five hours were made available to TV critics), this futuristic, violent drama returns to fine form, introducing new parts of the park (Shogun World!), new characters and apparently new technology goals on the part of Delos, the corporation that owns Westworld." Journalist Lorraine Ali of the Los Angeles Times said, "It's poised to be a intellectually stimulating and emotionally bumpy ride, where the very concept of your existence becomes the stuff of high-brow entertainment and low-bar thrills."

The New York Times TV critic James Poniewozik quipped, "don't expect too much improvement too fast from Westworld 2.0. It's still overly focused on balletic blood baths and narrative fake-outs, and much of the dialogue still sounds as if it were written as a tagline for a subway poster, like Dolores's 'I have one last role to play: myself.' But Westworld remains a glorious production to look at, and there are stretches where it feels invigorated by its new, expanded world—freer to breathe, relax, invent." Ben Travers of IndieWire wrote, "all around, the actors remain strong, including a number of new cast members. Where season 2 stumbles is its structure and pacing. Episodes don't carve equal time for everyone; they focus on the two most connected stories and sometimes break for an entire hour without getting back to a series regular." After the release of the third episode, Forbes criticized the season for departing too far from the show's roots and instead trying to be an "action blockbuster", arguing in part that the violence was overdone in comparison to the first season.

=== Accolades ===
Westworld received six nominations and one win at the 70th Primetime Emmy Awards, nominations included Outstanding Drama Series, Ed Harris and Jeffrey Wright for Outstanding Lead Actor in a Drama Series, Evan Rachel Wood for Outstanding Lead Actress in a Drama Series, and Jimmi Simpson for Outstanding Guest Actor in a Drama Series. Thandiwe Newton won for Outstanding Supporting Actress in a Drama Series. For the 76th Golden Globe Awards, Newton was nominated for Best Supporting Actress – Series, Miniseries or Television Film.

=== Ratings ===
Viewership and ratings per episode of Westworld season 2
No.	Title	Air date	Rating (18–49)	Viewers (millions)	DVR (18–49)	DVR viewers (millions)	Total (18–49)	Total viewers (millions)
1	"Journey into Night"	April 22, 2018	0.9	2.06	0.3	—N/a	1.2 (Note: Live +7 ratings were not available, so Live +3 ratings have been used instead.)	—N/a
2	"Reunion"	April 29, 2018	0.7	1.85	0.5	1.09	1.2	2.94
3	"Virtù e Fortuna"	May 6, 2018	0.6	1.63	—N/a	—N/a	—N/a	—N/a
4	"The Riddle of the Sphinx"	May 13, 2018	0.6	1.59	0.5	1.05	1.1	2.64
5	"Akane no Mai"	May 20, 2018	0.6	1.55	—N/a	—N/a	—N/a	—N/a
6	"Phase Space"	May 27, 2018	0.4	1.11	0.5	1.35	0.9	2.46
7	"Les Écorchés"	June 3, 2018	0.5	1.39	0.3	—N/a	0.8	—N/a
8	"Kiksuya"	June 10, 2018	0.6	1.44	0.4	1.04	1.0	2.48
9	"Vanishing Point"	June 17, 2018	0.6	1.56	—N/a	—N/a	—N/a	—N/a
10	"The Passenger"	June 24, 2018	0.6	1.56	0.4	1.06	1.0	2.62
