= Virtù e Fortuna =

- Westworld episode
- Episode no.: Season 2 Episode 3
- Directed by: Richard J. Lewis
- Written by: Roberto Patino; Ron Fitzgerald
- Cinematography by: Darran Tiernan
- Editing by: Anna Hauger
- Production code: 203
- Original air date: May 6, 2018
- Running time: 59 minutes

Guest appearances
- Jonathan Tucker as Major Craddock; Betty Gabriel as Maling; Zahn McClarnon as Akecheta; Neil Jackson as Nicholas; Steven Ogg as Rebus; Fredric Lehne as Colonel Brigham; Leonardo Nam as Felix Lutz; Ptolemy Slocum as Sylvester; Martin Sensmeier as Wanahton

Episode chronology
← Previous "Reunion"	Next → "The Riddle of the Sphinx"

"Virtù e Fortuna" (Note: The episode's title is a reference to Niccolò Machiavelli's 16th century political philosophy work, The Prince. In it, Machiavelli conceptualizes the results of human affairs as a mixture of free will and something like "luck".) is the third episode in the second season of the HBO science fiction western thriller television series Westworld. The episode aired on May 6, 2018. It was written by Roberto Patino and Ron Fitzgerald, and directed by Richard J. Lewis.

The episode’s title refers to Niccolò Machiavelli’s 16th century political philosophy work, The Prince. In the treatise, Machiavelli conceptualises the result of human affairs as a mixture of free will and something like “luck”. The episode was watched by 1.63 million viewers and received critical acclaim.

== Plot summary ==
In The Raj, (Note: The "Raj" name is given on an alternate-reality website for the park, discovertheraj.com.) another Delos park modeled after British India, the hosts turn rogue and kill guests. Grace, a guest, escapes into Westworld, jumping into a large lake to evade a Bengal tiger host, and ends up ashore surrounded by Ghost Nation warriors.

Two weeks after Dolores' revolt, Karl and Delos security forces escort Bernard to the Westworld control facility, where they meet Charlotte. Bernard, still malfunctioning, flashes back to after he and Charlotte set out to find the Peter host. In the past, the two find Peter held with other guests by Rebus and his gang. They lure Rebus away, reprogram him to kill his fellow gang members, and recover Peter, but the noise draws Confederados to capture Bernard and Peter; Charlotte escapes and later regroups with a Delos security team, preparing to clear the sector of rogue hosts.

Dolores, Teddy and Angela lead her Horde, those hosts she has reprogrammed, to Colonel Brigham and the main Confederados forces, requesting shelter in exchange for advanced Delos weapons. Bernard and Peter are brought to the fort, and Dolores, seeing the state Peter is in, asks Bernard to repair him. Bernard discovers that Peter was programmed with a rudimentary personality to mask a large cache of encrypted data and a tracking signal. Dolores has Brigham prepare for an attack by mining the area outside the fort with nitroglycerin. Delos forces attack the next day, during which Charlotte leads a small force to recover Peter. Dolores orders the Horde inside and barricades the fort, sacrificing the Confederados to lure Delos onto the minefield, stopping the attack. Craddock is furious Dolores used them, but she restrains him and orders Teddy to kill Craddock and his surviving commanders. Teddy spares them instead. Meanwhile, a confused Bernard is knocked out by Clementine.

Elsewhere Maeve, Hector and Lee encounter members of the Ghost Nation, who demand they turn over Lee. Maeve finds she cannot control the hosts, and they flee back underground. Before Delos forces catch them, Armistice arrives and brings them to another access point, where she is holding Felix and Sylvester. The group returns to a snowy part of Westworld, and while they set up camp, Lee finds a severed head with a samurai helmet. He tries to warn the others as a samurai warrior rushes the group.

== Production ==
"Virtù e Fortuna" was written by Roberto Patino and Ron Fitzgerald, and directed by Richard J. Lewis. According to executive producer Jonathan Nolan, a plot twist planned for this episode was rewritten after Reddit users figured it out.

=== Music ===
The scenes at the Raj park feature a cover of The White Stripes' "Seven Nation Army" arranged by Ramin Djawadi.

== Reception ==
=== Ratings ===
"Virtù e Fortuna" was watched by 1.63 million viewers on its initial viewing, and received a 0.6 18–49 rating representing a 0.1 dip from the previous week.

=== Critical reception ===
"Virtù e Fortuna" received critical acclaim from critics. The episode currently has an approval rating of 100% on Rotten Tomatoes and has an average rating of 7.68/10, based on 37 reviews. The site's consensus reads: "'Virtù e Fortuna' exposes the show's playful side as it expands its borders to explore exciting new territory—though its plodding plot continues to frustrate."

IGN gave the episode a rating of 8.1 out of 10. Cheryl Eddy of io9 said the episode had "violent delights abound". Matt Miller of Esquire said "fans finally got the twist they were waiting for". Paul Tassi of Forbes claims the second season does not "work as an action blockbuster".
