= Akane no Mai =

- Westworld episode
- Episode no.: Season 2 Episode 5
- Directed by: Craig Zobel
- Written by: Dan Dietz
- Cinematography by: Darran Tiernan
- Editing by: David Eisenberg
- Production code: 205
- Original air date: May 20, 2018
- Running time: 59 minutes

Guest appearances
- Rinko Kikuchi as Akane; Betty Gabriel as Maling; Hiroyuki Sanada as Musashi; Tao Okamoto as Hanaryo; Kiki Sukezane as Sakura; Masayoshi Haneda as Tanaka; Masaru Shinozuka as Shōgun; Leonardo Nam as Felix Lutz; Ptolemy Slocum as Sylvester; Lili Simmons as New Clementine; Rebecca Henderson as Goldberg

Episode chronology
← Previous "The Riddle of the Sphinx"	Next → "Phase Space"

"Akane no Mai" (Note: Japanese for "Akane's Dance") is the fifth episode in the second season of the HBO science fiction western thriller television series Westworld. The episode aired on May 20, 2018. It was written by Dan Dietz and directed by Craig Zobel.

The episode's plot includes Strand and his team analyzing the damage to the Mesa after retaking it in the present, and both Dolores's plans to assault the Mesa in the past and her answer to Teddy's merciful personality; however, it mostly focuses on Maeve's experiences in Shōgunworld, a park based on the Edo period of feudal Japan where guests can experience more extreme adventures.

"Akane no Mai" received acclaim from critics, who praised the performances of Thandiwe Newton and Rinko Kikuchi, the character development of Maeve, and the technical aspects in the Shōgunworld sequences. It represented the second season the most at the 70th Primetime Creative Arts Emmy Awards, being nominated for 7 out of 16 nominations for Westworld, and was also Thandiwe Newton's pick to support her nomination for Outstanding Supporting Actress, which she ultimately won.

== Plot summary ==
In the present, Delos security teams resecure the control center, which is filled with dead bodies of other Delos security teams.

In flashbacks, Dolores, Teddy and the Horde return to Sweetwater to secure the locomotive normally used by guests to enter the park; Dolores intends to use it to reach the Mesa and locate Peter. Dolores recalls a memory of how her father dealt with an infection among their cattle herd by slaughtering the weak rather than caring for them. Teddy, still unsure of Dolores' plans, admits he will always follow her. She tells him that she has been struggling with Teddy's nature since witnessing him sparing Craddock, but he has proven that he is a decent person. Seeing his decency as a liability in the fight to come, she changes the parameters of his personality against his will after they have sex at Mariposa.

At the edge of the park, Maeve's party is captured by the ronin Musashi and outlaw Hanaryo, and escorted into Shōgunworld. Lee warns her that Shōgunworld was designed to be more extreme than Westworld. They are taken to a nearby village where Maeve and Hector realize that many of the hosts in Shōgunworld are their doppelgängers fulfilling similar roles to themselves, a shortcut used by Lee in crafting the narratives. The geisha Akane—Maeve's doppelgänger—kills an emissary from a local shōgun when he demands she turn over her dancer Sakura. Maeve convinces Akane to bring Sakura and escape with them into the underground network. That night, the shōgun sends ninjas to attack. When the shōgun's samurai arrive, Hector, Armistice and Musashi stay behind to distract them and are captured, while Maeve and the others flee. Instead of escaping, Maeve decides to rescue Sakura from the shōgun.

They infiltrate the shōgun's camp and find the shōgun host leaking cortical fluid, making him unpredictable and dangerous. The shōgun forces Akane to dance with Sakura that night in exchange for returning her. Before the dance, the shōgun kills Sakura—whom Maeve deduces to be Akane's daughter—and in revenge, Akane kills the shōgun with a concealed dagger. Maeve uses her newfound power to turn the shōgun's daimyōs on each other, and prepares her group as the rest of the shōgun's army rush in.

== Production ==
"Akane no Mai" introduces Shōgunworld, another Delos park which had been previously suggested during the first-season finale, with the aim to be set around the Edo period of feudal Japan. The set for the village that Maeve and her group visit in Shōgunworld was physically built next to the Sweetwater set, with several of the buildings sharing the same structure; one could enter one building in the Sweetwater set and exit it onto the Shōgunworld set. This allowed the village to mirror that of Sweetwater, reflecting the theme of narrative reuse within the episode. This further was extended to the costumes and makeup for Akane, Musashi and Hanaryo which were designed either to match or mirror those of Maeve, Hector and Armistice.

=== Music ===
The episode featured compositions from Ramin Djawadi which include a revamped version of his cover of The Rolling Stones' "Paint It Black" used throughout the first season, and of Wu-Tang Clan's "C.R.E.A.M."

== Reception ==
=== Ratings ===
"Akane no Mai" was watched by 1.55 million viewers on its initial viewing, and received a 0.6 18–49 rating, holding steady with the previous week.

=== Critical reception ===
"Akane no Mai" received positive reviews from critics. At Rotten Tomatoes, the episode has a 90% approval rating with an average score of 8.29/10, from 40 reviews, The site's critical consensus reads: "'Akane No Mai' finally delivers a picture perfect Shōgunworld, complete with familiarly intriguing new characters, meticulously intricate world design and a buffet of violent delights."

Giving it 5/5 stars, Vulture called it the "best episode yet of the entire series" because it embraced a "clear dramatic tack" and told a "contained, straightforward story." Forbes called the episode's depiction of the recycled stories and characters in Shōgunworld a "depressingly realistic dystopia". "Akane no Mai" resulted in a tepid review from The Washington Post'', although the review still called the episode's thematic explorations an "absolute delight".

The New York Times praised Maeve's character development in recognizing a brave doppelgänger in the character Akane, and finally noted that Dolores had been turned into a "horror figure". It suggested that her forcing Teddy to have his personality overwritten proved that "forcing someone into a new story can be an awful form of violence." The review also noted that Dolores was unable to entirely sever her connection to Teddy or her father, the former given a partial reset instead of a "full reset".

== See also ==
- Edo period in popular culture
