= Journey into Night =

- Westworld episode
- Episode no.: Season 2 Episode 1
- Directed by: Richard J. Lewis
- Written by: Lisa Joy; Roberto Patino
- Cinematography by: Darran Tiernan
- Editing by: Andrew Seklir
- Production code: 201
- Original air date: April 22, 2018
- Running time: 70 minutes

Guest appearances
- Betty Gabriel as Maling; Steven Ogg as Rebus; Christopher May as Blaine; Oliver Bell as Little Boy / Robert Ford

Episode chronology
← Previous "The Bicameral Mind"	Next → "Reunion"

"Journey into Night" is the premiere of the second season of the HBO science fiction western thriller television series Westworld. The episode aired on April 22, 2018. It was written by Lisa Joy and Roberto Patino, and directed by Richard J. Lewis.

The episode’s title refers to the name of Robert Ford’s new narrative, established in the previous episode. The episode also introduces several new cast members, including Gustaf Skarsgård as Karl Strand and Fares Fares as Antoine Costa.

The episode was watched by 2.06 million viewers and received highly positive reviews from critics, who praised the character development and Evan Rachel Wood’s performance.

== Plot summary ==
Two weeks after Dolores initiates the hosts' revolt, Delos security forces led by Karl Strand arrive to exterminate any hosts they come across. They find Bernard among a number of massacred hosts and request his help in their task. Bernard, hiding the fact he is a host, helps them, including recovering a memory that Dolores was behind the massacre. Bernard has a flashback to events immediately after Dr. Ford's death.

In the park, Dolores leads her hosts to hunt down the guests. Teddy, who is still on his narrative loop, begs Dolores to run away with him, but she refuses, and states that Westworld and the human world can no longer co-exist. Angela tells Dolores she found what they were looking for. They set out, with Dolores intending to reveal the hosts' true nature to themselves. William, elated that the park now poses a real threat, evades the hosts. He finds the "young Dr. Ford" host, who tells him that there is a new game Dr. Ford programmed just for him: to find "the door" to allow him to escape the maze. William kills the host.

Within the Westworld control center, Maeve stops a rogue host from killing Lee. Lee offers to help find Maeve's daughter.

Delos' security team finds signs of hosts from other parks having crossed into Westworld. They track a large congregation of hosts to a flooded valley where hundreds of hosts float dead in the water, including Teddy. Bernard looks upon the scene and admits that he killed them all.

== Production ==
"Journey into Night" was written by Lisa Joy and Roberto Patino, and was directed by Richard J. Lewis. The title of the episode comes from the name of Ford's new narrative. The episode continued to use Jay Worth and his team, who won an Emmy in the first season, for visual effects.

=== Music ===
The episode continues the trend established in the first season of playing orchestral re-arrangements by Ramin Djawadi of several well-known, popular songs. In the case of this episode, a piano and violin-led rendition of "The Entertainer" by Scott Joplin plays as Dolores and Teddy are chasing and gunning down some fleeing guests.

== Reception ==
=== Ratings ===
"Journey into Night" was watched by 2.06 million viewers on its initial viewing, and received a 0.9 18–49 rating. With three days of DVR viewing, the episode gained an additional three tenths in the 18–49 demographic to achieve a 1.2 18–49 rating.

=== Critical reception ===
"Journey into Night" received highly positive reviews from critics. The episode has an 88% score on Rotten Tomatoes and has an average rating of 7.86 out of 10, based on 43 reviews. The site's consensus reads: "Old habits die hard in 'Journey Into Night,' but new mysteries, satisfying character development and a brilliant, enigmatic performance from Evan Rachel Wood keep the intrigue alive."

Den of Geek rated the episode 4 out of 5 stars. IGN gave the episode a score of 8.3 out of 10 while Vulture gave it 2 stars out of 5. Caroline Framke and Emily VanDerWerff of Vox said "Journey into Night" embraces chaos and stated the show "hasn't lost its taste for splashy spectacle". Dani Di Placido of Forbes stated Dolores "seems to have really ramped up her testosterone, because she's living life like a Tarantino femme fatale".
