= Parce Domine (Westworld) =

- Westworld episode
- Episode no.: Season 3 Episode 1
- Directed by: Jonathan Nolan
- Written by: Lisa Joy; Jonathan Nolan
- Cinematography by: Paul Cameron
- Editing by: Stephen Semel
- Production code: 301
- Original air date: March 15, 2020
- Running time: 68 minutes

Guest appearances
- John Gallagher Jr. as Liam Dempsey Jr.; Tommy Flanagan as Martin Conells; Lena Waithe as Ash; Scott Mescudi as Francis; Marshawn Lynch as Giggles; Pom Klementieff as Martel; Rafi Gavron as Roderick; Phoebe Tonkin as Penny; Thomas Kretschmann as Gerald; Russell Wong as Brompton; Wayne Péré as Therapist; Michael Filipowich as Joe; Payman Maadi as Elliot; Charmin Lee as Joanna

Episode chronology
← Previous "The Passenger"	Next → "The Winter Line"

"Parce Domine" is the first episode in the third season premiere of the HBO science fiction dystopian thriller television series Westworld. The episode aired on March 15, 2020. It was written by series co-creators Lisa Joy and Jonathan Nolan, and directed by Nolan.

== Plot summary ==
In Beihai, China, Dolores locates and coerces Gerald, a former shareholder in Delos, to sign over confidential files related to AI company Incite. In the end he dies when he tries to attack her as she leaves. She tells his wife that she is now free.

In Los Angeles, former soldier Caleb struggles with the trauma of losing his friend Francis in combat. Unable to secure better work than construction, he makes ends meet through petty crime jobs offered via the Rico app, which uses blockchain technology to allow individuals to accept short-term illegal work such as transporting illegal substances, robbing ATMs, kidnapping, and murder.

In San Francisco, the Charlotte host takes control of the Delos board in William's absence. They vote to resume the production of park hosts.

In southeast Asia, Bernard, working at a livestock farm under a new alias, hides from a global manhunt, having been framed for the Westworld massacre. Two co-workers recognize and attempt to capture him, but Bernard fights them off and later secures passage back to Westworld.

Dolores gets close to Liam Dempsey Jr., the son of Incite's co-founder, to learn more about the strategic planning AI called Rehoboam, which plays a large role in public policy around the world. Liam reveals he cannot access it as his deceased father never shared the codes with him. As Liam is about to tell Dolores the name of the only person with access, Martin, his head of security, arrives and knocks Dolores out, revealing she has been using a stolen identity. Martin and his men plan to kill her, using the Rico service to request a stolen car and lethal drugs. Caleb accepts the job and arrives. He is concerned for the unconscious woman but walks away when ordered.

Dolores wakes up and kills Martin's men, leading to a firefight in which she receives a gunshot wound. Martin flees but is caught by Dolores. Under duress, Martin divulges the name "Serac" as the person she seeks. A host-copy of Martin created by Dolores arrives and kills the real Martin. Caleb finds a sense of purpose and returns in time to help Dolores as she faints from blood loss.

In a post-credits scene, Maeve wakes up to find herself in a room with a tied-up soldier nearby. She looks out the window to see herself in the midst of World War II.

== Music ==
Songs and compositions present in the episode, in chronological order:

- "Il Trovatore: Di Quella Pira", by Hungarian State Opera Orchestra
- "Bubbles Buried in This Jungle", by Death Grips
- "Dissolved Girl", by Massive Attack
- "Human", by Sevdaliza
- "Common People", by Pulp

== Reception ==
On Rotten Tomatoes, the episode has an 81% approval rating with an average score of 7.25/10, from 26 reviews. The site's critical consensus reads: "'Parce Domine' dares to go beyond the show's previous boundaries, embarking upon an entirely different world while successfully adding Aaron Paul to its beloved set of actors."

The original live broadcast received 901,000 viewers, down 57% from the second season premiere. Across all HBO digital platforms, the episode had a cumulative viewership from 1.7 million.
