= DMZ (miniseries) =

2022 American streaming television miniseries

- Genre: Alternate history; Drama; Dystopia
- Created by: Roberto Patino
- Based on: Characters created for DC by: Brian Wood; Riccardo Burchielli
- Showrunner: Roberto Patino
- Directed by: Ava DuVernay; Ernest Dickerson
- Starring: Rosario Dawson; Hoon Lee; Freddy Miyares; Jordan Preston Carter; Venus Ariel; Amandla Jahava; Benjamin Bratt
- Music by: Kris Bowers
- Country of origin: United States
- Original language: English
- No. of episodes: 4

Production
- Executive producers: Roberto Patino; Ava DuVernay; Paul Garnes; Ernest Dickerson
- Producers: Dale Williams; Tim Scanlan
- Cinematography: Matthew J. Lloyd
- Editors: Gina Hirsch; John Reyes-Nguyen
- Running time: 58–60 minutes
- Production companies: ARRAY Filmworks; Analog; DC Entertainment; Warner Bros. Television

Original release
- Network: HBO Max
- Release: March 17, 2022

DMZ is an American dystopian drama miniseries created by Roberto Patino. It is based on the comic book series by Brian Wood and Riccardo Burchielli. DMZ premiered on HBO Max on March 17, 2022. A portion premiered at SXSW on March 12, 2022.

== Premise ==
Alma Ortega, a medic, becomes a symbol of hope in a demilitarized zone on Manhattan Island while trying to find her son, who wandered off during their evacuation during the Second American Civil War.

== Cast ==
=== Main ===
- Rosario Dawson as Alma "Zee" Ortega, a medic who spent the last 8 years looking for her son
- Hoon Lee as Wilson, the leader of Chinatown, Manhattan, who knew Alma before the war
- Freddy Miyares as Skel, Parco's assassin and Alma's son formerly known as Christian Ortega
- Jordan Preston Carter as Odi, an orphaned kid inside the DMZ who becomes friends with Alma
- Venus Ariel as Nico, Odi's friend
- Amandla Jahava as Nicole
- Benjamin Bratt as Parco Delgado, Alma's ex and a leader of the Spanish Harlem Kings who controls a part of Upper Manhattan

=== Recurring ===
- Mamie Gummer as Rose
- Agam Darshi as Franklin
- Rey Gallegos as Cesar
- Henry G. Sanders as Cedric
- Jade Wu as Susie, Wilson's advisor
- Sydney Park as Tenny, Skel's love interest
- Juani Feliz as Carmen, Parco's wife
- Nora Dunn as Oona, the woman who controls the water supply
- Rutina Wesley as Athena

In addition, Bryan Gael Guzman co-stars as Christian Ortega, Alma's teenage son in flashbacks.

== Episodes ==
No.	Title	Directed by	Written by	Original release date	Prod. code
1	"Good Luck"	Ava DuVernay	Roberto Patino	March 17, 2022	T58.10001
2	"Advent"	Ernest Dickerson	Roberto Patino & Carly Wray	March 17, 2022	T58.10102
3	"The Good Name"	Ernest Dickerson	Roberto Patino & Carly Wray	March 17, 2022	T58.10103
4	"Home"	Ernest Dickerson	Roberto Patino	March 17, 2022	T58.10104

== Production ==
=== Development ===
In February 2014, it was announced that Syfy was planning on making a TV series adaptation of the comic with former writers and executive producers Andre Jacquemetton and Maria Jacquemetton, with David Heyman as executive producer for the potential series. On October 1, 2019, it was announced that HBO Max was developing a TV series adaptation of the comic with Ava DuVernay directing the pilot with Roberto Patino writing the pilot and as showrunner the series. It was also announced that DuVernay and Patino would both executive produce under their respective overall deals with Warner Bros. Television. On November 19, 2020, HBO Max gave DMZ a limited series order of four episodes, with Patino set to write all of the episodes. In July 2021, Ernest Dickerson joined the series as an executive producer and directed three episodes. The series premiered on March 17, 2022.

=== Casting ===
On January 22, 2020, Rosario Dawson was cast as Alma. On February 6, 2020, Benjamin Bratt was cast as Parco Delgado. On February 18, 2020, Freddy Miyares was cast as Skel. Upon the limited series order announcement, Hoon Lee and Jordan Preston Carter joined the main cast. On July 12, 2021, Rutina Wesley, Mamie Gummer, Nora Dunn, and Henry G. Sanders were cast in undisclosed capacities while Venus Ariel, Jade Wu, Rey Gallegos, Agam Darshi, and Juani Feliz were cast as series regulars.

=== Filming ===
On October 1, 2019, the pilot was scheduled to go into production in early 2020, with filming on the pilot wrapping on March 16, 2020. Filming for the pilot took place in Atlanta. The pilot was picked up, and filming for the remaining three episodes took place in 2021.

== Reception ==
On the review aggregator website Rotten Tomatoes, 52% of 25 critics' reviews are positive, with an average rating of 5.9/10. The website's consensus reads: "DMZ takes an explosive premise and lets it fizzle, although a commanding Benjamin Bratt tries his best to ignite some sparks in this uneven dystopian drama." Metacritic, which uses a weighted average, assigned the film a score of 57 out of 100, based on 11 critics, indicating "mixed or average" reviews.
