= Phase Space (Westworld) =

- Westworld episode
- Episode no.: Season 2 Episode 6
- Directed by: Tarik Saleh
- Written by: Carly Wray
- Cinematography by: John Grillo
- Editing by: Ron Rosen
- Production code: 206
- Original air date: May 27, 2018
- Running time: 59 minutes

Guest appearances
- Rinko Kikuchi as Akane; Hiroyuki Sanada as Musashi; Leonardo Nam as Felix Lutz; Ptolemy Slocum as Sylvester; Zahn McClarnon as Akecheta; Tao Okamoto as Hanaryo; Kiki Sukezane as Sakura; Masayoshi Haneda as Tanaka; Timothy V. Murphy as Coughlin; Ronnie Gene Blevins as Engels; Erica Luttrell as New Mother; Rebecca Henderson as Goldberg

Episode chronology
← Previous "Akane no Mai"	Next → "Les Écorchés"

"Phase Space" is the sixth episode in the second season of the HBO science fiction western thriller television series Westworld. The episode aired on May 27, 2018. It was written by Carly Wray and directed by Tarik Saleh.

“Phase Space” was watched by 1.11 million viewers and received positive reviews.

== Plot summary ==
Maeve and her group survive the attack by the shōgun's army. Musashi secures their safe passage by killing Tanaka, the shōgun's lieutenant, in a duel. They reach the shrine at Snow Lake where Lee, Felix and Sylvester locate the access point. Maeve suggests that Akane and Musashi come with them, but they decline.

Maeve's group returns to Westworld, emerging near the farmstead where Maeve had previously lived with her daughter. Maeve discovers that another host is playing the mother role. A Ghost Nation raiding party attacks and Maeve flees with her daughter. While Hector and the other hosts come to their aid, Akecheta—leader of the raiding party—tells Maeve that they should come with him, as they are looking for the same thing.

William rides with his gang and his daughter Emily and believes she is a host built by Ford. William and Emily have a difficult talk about her mother and her childhood. William promises Emily she can come with them, but Emily wakes the next day to find William and the others have left her behind. William and his gang run into a Ghost Nation ambush.

Dolores and the Horde prepare to take the train to the Mesa. They set the train loaded with explosives at full speed, planning to crash into the Mesa's entry terminal.

Charlotte and Ashley bring Peter to the Mesa, allowing Charlotte to call for armed backup. A unit of armed mercenaries led by Coughlin arrive and take over from Delos' security forces. They bring Westworld's systems online in time to see the train barreling down on the Mesa.

Bernard and Elsie make their way back to the Mesa, and discover that the Cradle, the central repository of host data, has hijacked the park's systems, and that they must go there to find the source. Bernard uses a host-interface machine to enter into the Cradle's system and look for the anomaly. He experiences a pre-uprising Sweetwater, and on entering the saloon discovers Ford waiting for him.

== Reception ==
"Phase Space" was watched by 1.11 million viewers on its initial viewing, and received a 0.4 18–49 rating, marking a series low in viewership.

"Phase Space" received very positive reviews from critics. At Rotten Tomatoes, the episode has a 97% approval rating with an average score of 7.24/10, from 33 reviews. The site's critical consensus reads: "'Phase Space' shocks with a surprising character return and a gratifying answer to one of Westworld's biggest riddles, leading to further gripping questions."
