= Reunion (Westworld) =

- Westworld episode
- Episode no.: Season 2 Episode 2
- Directed by: Vincenzo Natali
- Written by: Carly Wray; Jonathan Nolan
- Cinematography by: John Grillo
- Editing by: David Eisenberg
- Production code: 202
- Original air date: April 29, 2018
- Running time: 60 minutes

Guest appearances
- Jimmi Simpson as young William; Ben Barnes as Logan Delos; Zahn McClarnon as Akecheta; Peter Mullan as James Delos; Jonathan Tucker as Major Craddock; Giancarlo Esposito as new El Lazo / Robert Ford; Christopher May as Blaine; Paul Riley Fox as Younger Man

Episode chronology
← Previous "Journey into Night"	Next → "Virtù e Fortuna"

"Reunion" is the second episode in the second season of the HBO science fiction western thriller television series Westworld. The episode aired on April 29, 2018. It was written by Carly Wray and Jonathan Nolan, and directed by Vincenzo Natali.

The episode's plot deals with flashbacks of Logan Delos's first experience with the hosts and William convincing James Delos of investing on Westworld. In the present, it deals with Dolores and the Man in Black separately amassing their own armies to fight off the impending security teams from Delos and to destroy the "Pearly Gates" respectively. It also introduces the character of Akecheta, leader of the Ghost Nation, played by Zahn McClarnon.

"Reunion" was watched by 1.85 million viewers and received critical acclaim. Critics praised the flashback sequences, Evan Rachel Wood's performance and Giancarlo Esposito's surprise appearance. The episode was also Wood's and Jimmi Simpson's pick to support their respective nominations at the 70th Primetime Emmy Awards for Outstanding Lead Actress and Outstanding Guest Actor.

== Plot summary ==
In a flashback, Arnold and Ford organize a demonstration of the hosts to convince Logan Delos to invest in Westworld. Logan is stunned to discover that the hosts are indistinguishable from humans. He sleeps with Angela to explore how life-like the hosts are. Arnold takes Dolores to see his home.

Logan's father James is critical of Logan's investment as he does not see a practical business model for Westworld. William takes him to the park and convinces him that they can use the hosts to gather data on the guests and use it to further the Delos Corporation's business interests. Impressed, James buys out the park and names William as his successor. Dolores encounters an embittered Logan, who tells her they have doomed humanity. William berates Dolores saying she is "just a thing" and later shows her a special excavation project that he is constructing within Westworld.

In the present, William rescues Lawrence and convinces Lawrence to follow him due west to the "Pearly Gates," where William intends to burn the park to the ground. He heads to Pariah to recruit the host currently playing the outlaw El Lazo to deal with amassing Confederado forces. El Lazo passes on a message from Ford that William must complete the game on his own. He and his gang shoot themselves to prevent William from recruiting them. William continues on his quest to destroy his "greatest mistake".

Dolores, Teddy, Angela, and other hosts raid a refurbishment outpost where guests and technicians are cowering. Dolores shows Teddy his true nature as a host. A technician informs Dolores that hundreds of men will come to kill them as part of the park's protocols. Outnumbered, Dolores decides to recruit the Confederados to fight. Dolores' group runs into Maeve while at a camp. Maeve questions their newfound "freedom" before moving on, electing not to join Dolores. At the Confederados base, Dolores demonstrates her apparent god-like ability to bring dead hosts back to life, gaining their loyalty as she leads them to "the Valley Beyond". She shows Teddy the same spot that William had shown her years earlier, telling him the site houses a weapon they can use against the humans.

== Production ==
"Reunion" was written by Carly Wray and Jonathan Nolan, and was directed by Vincenzo Natali. The casting of Giancarlo Esposito as the new El Lazo was kept secret. He was cast due to Anthony Hopkins being a fan of Esposito's portrayal of Gus Fring on AMC's television series Breaking Bad. Esposito himself was also a fan of Westworld, and was told by the writing staff of Better Call Saul that the Westworld creators had some ideas for him as a character. Esposito contacted Joy and Nolan, and after their pitch and knowing he would be acting opposite Harris, Esposito took the role, promising to keep it a secret.

The episode includes model Claire Unabia as William's wife and Logan's sister Juliet. Unabia, as Juliet, had been shown in the first season's pilot episode, "The Original", as the woman at Times Square in the photograph that Peter found and caused him to fall out of his loop. The image itself was a Getty Images photograph, and when Unabia, who came to fame for appearing on America's Next Top Model, was asked about the photograph after its premiere, she expressed she was surprised to be involved with the show.

=== Music ===
During the flashback showing Logan Delos' first contact with Ford and Arnold's first hosts, a piano cover of "Runaway" by Kanye West plays in the background. Other classic piano compositions play in the episode, like Sergei Rachmaninoff's Morceaux de fantaisie, Op. 3: II. Prelude in C-Sharp Minor at the beginning of the episode, in cold open, and Frédéric Chopin's Piano Sonata No. 2 in B-Flat Minor, Op. 35: III. Marche funebre, Lento, played by Dolores at James Delos's retirement party. After he asks her to play "anything but fucking Chopin", she switches to the Gershwin piece "The Man I Love", which had already been performed earlier in the episode by host Clementine at the demonstration for Logan.

== Reception ==
=== Ratings ===
"Reunion" was watched by 1.85 million viewers on its initial viewing, and received a 0.7 18–49 rating. With three days of DVR viewing, the episode gained an additional four tenths in the 18–49 demographic to achieve a 1.1 18–49 rating. Overall the episode had an audience of 2.98 viewers, and a 1.2 18–49 rating with seven day DVR viewing.

=== Critical reception ===
"Reunion" received critical acclaim. The episode has a 95% score on Rotten Tomatoes as of 2019, with an average rating of 8.53 out of 10, based on 38 reviews. The site's consensus reads "'Reunion' moves Westworld forward with a fascinating look back, shedding light on the park's mysterious origins to answer some important questions and raises a few new ones."

David Crow of Den of Geek US rated the episode 4 out of 5 stars. Ron Hogan of Den of Geek UK said the episode had "a beautifully wrought script" and that "battle lines continue to be drawn in Westworld season 2". IGN gave the episode a score of 8.8 out of 10. Vulture gave the episode 4 stars out of 5, stating the recap of the episode was "A Place Hidden from God". Caroline Framke and Emily VanDerWerff of Vox said "Reunion" had "finally answered some big questions", but questioned why characters "talk in monologues all of the time". Adrienne Gibbs of Forbes said the episode was "full of splendor and origin stories".
