= Carly Wray =

American television writer and producer

- Born: Carly Ann Wray; Arlington, Texas
- Occupations: Television writer, producer
- Years active: 2012–present
- Notable work: Mad Men; The Leftovers

Carly Ann Wray is an American television writer and producer. She is known for her writing on the AMC drama Mad Men and The Leftovers on HBO. She won a Writers Guild of America Award for Dramatic Series for Mad Men in 2016, and was nominated for an Emmy for Outstanding Drama Series along with the producing staff of Westworld in 2018.

== Professional career ==
A graduate of Reed College and the USC School of Cinematic Arts, Wray started her career in television as a writer's assistant on Mad Men in 2012. Promoted to staff writer after a year, Wray co-wrote her first script, "In Care Of", with Matthew Weiner, before going on to write two additional episodes in the show's final seasons, "Waterloo" and "The Milk and Honey Route".

After her work on Mad Men, Wray joined the staff of the first season of Constantine, a David Goyer production for NBC, based on the long-running Hellblazer comic. Freelance film and television critic Logan Dalton praised Wray's writing in the mid-season finale, saying that she "connect[ed] many of the dots for the 'Rising Darkness' and end[ed] the episode on a note that will make viewers want to tune in when the show returns".

Wray returned to cable after Constantine's cancellation, writing episodes of Kurt Sutter's The Bastard Executioner for FX, and the David Fincher series Mindhunter, a Netflix drama based on the works of legendary FBI profiler John Douglas. She then became a co-producer on the third and final season of The Leftovers and a producer on the second season of Westworld on HBO.

On May 4, 2017, HBO announced that Wray was one of four writers working on a potential pilot for a Game of Thrones spin-off. In addition to Wray, Max Borenstein, Jane Goldman, and Brian Helgeland were also working on potential pilots. Wray was working and communicating with George R. R. Martin, the author of A Song of Ice and Fire, the series of novels upon which the original series is based. Upon the announcement, Indiewire critic Ben Travers praised the idea of Wray as a writer for the ongoing adaptations: "Wray can nudge the franchise in a new direction, since Game of Thrones has been a boys' club for most of its journey thus far. Bringing in a female perspective is a great idea, especially with so many female characters to explore in a spin-off — and especially with a candidate like Wray readying a script." Then Game of Thrones showrunners D. B. Weiss and David Benioff would have also been executive producers for whichever project was picked up by HBO.

In 2018, Wray sold a feature film script based on the New York Times article "The Incarcerated Women Who Fight California's Wildfires" by Jaime Lowe, with Margot Robbie's Lucky Chap producing. She also began work on You Know You Want This, an anthology series based on Kristen Roupenian's short stories, for HBO.

Wray was a writer and Co-Executive Producer on Damon Lindelof's Watchmen.

== Works ==
=== Television ===
Year	TV series	Credit/role	Notes	Ref.
2012–2015	Mad Men	Staff writer	Episodes: "In Care Of", "Waterloo", "The Milk and Honey Route"; Writers Guild of America Award for Dramatic Series (2016); Nominated — Writers Guild of America Award for Dramatic Series (2014-2015); Nominated — Gold Derby Award for Best Drama Episode of the Year (2014)	
2014	Constantine	Writer	Episode: "The Saint of Last Resorts: Part One"	
2015	The Bastard Executioner	Writer/story editor	Episode: "Behold the Lamb / Gweled yr Oen"	
2017	The Leftovers	Writer/co-producer	Episode: "Certified"	
2017	Mindhunter	Writer	Episode: "Episode 9"	
2018	Westworld	Writer/producer	Episode: "Reunion", "Phase Space", "Kiksuya" Nominated — Emmy Award for Outstanding Drama Series (2018)	
2019	Watchmen	Writer/co-executive producer	Episode: "Little Fear of Lightning"; Writers Guild of America Award for New Series (2020); Nominated — Writers Guild of America Award for Dramatic Series (2020)	
2022	DMZ	Writer/co-executive producer	Episodes: "Advent", "The Good Name"	

=== Film ===
Year	Title	Credit/role	Notes	Ref.
TBA	An Innocent Girl	Writer	Berlanti-Schechter Films/Netflix; with Michael Mohan and Marc Guggenheim	

== Personal life ==
She lives with her husband, Aaron Fili, in New York, New York.
