= Trompe L'Oeil (Westworld) =

- Westworld episode
- Westworld series logo
- Episode no.: Season 1 Episode 7
- Directed by: Frederick E.O. Toye
- Written by: Halley Gross; Jonathan Nolan
- Cinematography by: Brendan Galvin
- Editing by: Andrew Seklir
- Production code: 4X6157
- Original air date: November 13, 2016
- Running time: 57 minutes

Guest appearances
- Ptolemy Slocum as Sylvester; Leonardo Nam as Felix Lutz; James Landry Herbert as Slim Miller

Episode chronology
← Previous "The Adversary"	Next → "Trace Decay"

"Trompe L'Oeil" is the seventh episode in the first season of the HBO science fiction western thriller television series Westworld. The episode aired on November 13, 2016.

The episode received very positive reviews from critics, and in particular for the ending. The title comes from the art of trompe-l'œil.

== Plot summary ==
Theresa meets with Charlotte where it is revealed Theresa was colluding with the Delos board to sneak Dr. Ford and Arnold's host research and code out of the park to force Dr. Ford into retirement without losing the code. Having failed with the use of a rogue host, they decide to humiliate Dr. Ford instead.

Meanwhile, Maeve sees if she can make Clementine self-aware when park staff come to take her away. Maeve purposely kills herself so that she can follow. In Operations, Maeve sneaks into a nearby lab to watch as Theresa modifies the programming of Clementine to make her appear violent towards humans by staging her killing a host designed to represent a human. Theresa states this was a result of the Reveries update, and Bernard, as head of the Behaviors department, takes the blame and is fired. Maeve, having sneaked into a nearby lab, witnesses all this as well as Clementine being taken to storage as a retired host. Maeve tells Felix and Sylvester she needs their help to escape the park, threatening to kill them if they don't help.

William, Dolores, and Lawrence continue on the train through Ghost Nation territory. William and Dolores become attracted to each other and have sex, and William comes to the realization that Westworld can reveal a person's true character. The train is suddenly stopped by Confederados who want revenge on Lawrence. The three use one of the nitroglycerine-soaked corpses to distract their escape on horseback. The Ghost Nation arrives to chase off the Confederados. When Dolores spots a canyon that she had seen in her dreams, she and William part ways with Lawrence to follow it.

Bernard later approaches Theresa and says he is aware of her collusion with the board and knows the demonstration with Clementine was rigged, but he wants her help in investigating Dr. Ford. He takes her to the cottage in Sector 17, but find the host family absent. Theresa finds a hidden door that leads to a secret lab under it, which includes an undocumented host-making machine and several host designs including for Dolores and for Bernard. Dr. Ford arrives, revealing to Theresa that Bernard is a host, and that she was not the first to try to oust him from the park. Dr. Ford then orders Bernard to kill Theresa, by smashing her head emotionlessly against the wall.

== Production ==
"Trompe L'Oeil" was written by Halley Gross and series co-creator Jonathan Nolan, and was directed by Frederick E.O. Toye, who worked with Nolan on his previous TV series Person of Interest.

== Reception ==
=== Ratings ===
"Trompe L'Oeil" was viewed by 1.75 million American households on its initial viewing. The episode also acquired a 0.8 rating in the 18–49 demographic. In the United Kingdom, the episode was seen by 1.05 million viewers on Sky Atlantic.

=== Critical reception ===
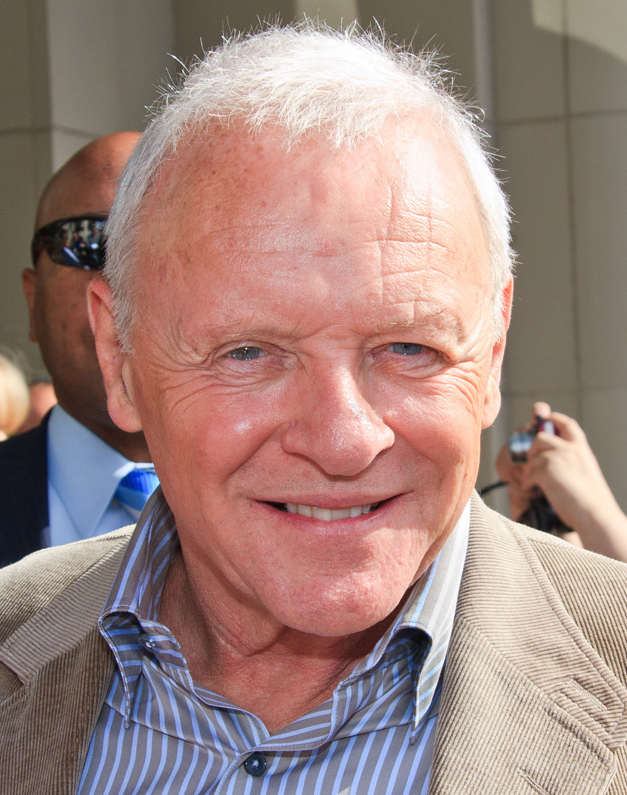
Anthony Hopkins received praise for his performance as Robert Ford

"Trompe L'Oeil" received critical acclaim from critics. The episode had a 100% score on Rotten Tomatoes and an average rating of 8.79 out of 10, based on 22 reviews. The site's consensus reads "'Trompe L'Oeil' confirms a major fan theory with a chilling episode whose narrative shocks are further fueled by a bevy of standout performances."

Eric Goldman of IGN reviewed the episode positively, saying, "As notable as the ending to "Trompe L'Oeil" was, there were a ton of other events going on beforehand that contributed to another standout episode." He gave it a score of 9.2 out of 10. Scott Tobias of The New York Times wrote in his review of the episode; "Although Bernard's true identity is the episode's big twist, the most enduring revelation may be Ford's resistance to Delos's plans for his creations. Last week, that off-the-grid cottage seemed like Ford’s nostalgic attempt to revisit his childhood, using older models of his machines. But there's another level to that, literally and metaphorically." Zack Handlen of The A.V. Club wrote in his review, "Seven episodes in and Westworld finally delivers both its first human death, and its first truly shocking surprise." He gave the episode an A−.

Liz Shannon Miller of IndieWire wrote in her review, "There’s been an awful lot of set-up in weeks past, which was relatively essential given the complexity of the world being slowly unfurled. But this episode finally built up some major momentum for the season's endgame — rewarding our patience and getting us in gear for one hell of a ride to the end." She gave the episode an A. James Hibberd of Entertainment Weekly wrote in his review, "The story was always on the side of the hosts, and now the writers have doubled down on their gamble that the audience will accept robots as protagonists." He gave the episode an A−. Catherine Gee of The Daily Telegraph wrote in her review, "Well, that escalated... perhaps not exactly quickly, but escalated it certainly has. And one of the big fan theories about this series has been proven true." David Crow of Den of Geek said in his review, "Yes, 'Trompe L'Oeil' was where at least some of the cards were placed on the table" He gave the episode a four out of five. Erik Kain of Forbes also reviewed the episode, saying, "Sunday night's episode of Westworld was perhaps the first in the show's opening salvo to give us as many answers as it did questions. In a very real and very chilling way, the seventh episode of the first season pulled back the veil, confirming one of the biggest fan theories out there. But it also gave us answers about some of the other mysteries we've been hunting, and that's exactly what it needed to do at precisely the right time."

=== Accolades ===
Year	Award	Category	Nominee(s)	Result	Ref.
2017	Golden Reel Awards	Best Sound Editing in Television, Short Form: FX/Foley	Thomas E. de Gorter, Matthew Sawelson, Geordy Sincavage, Michael Head, Tara Blume, Rick Owens, Mark R. Allen and Marc Glassman	Won	
