= The Riddle of the Sphinx (Westworld) =

- Westworld episode
- Episode no.: Season 2 Episode 4
- Directed by: Lisa Joy
- Written by: Gina Atwater; Jonathan Nolan
- Cinematography by: John Grillo
- Editing by: Andrew Seklir
- Production code: 204
- Original air date: May 13, 2018
- Running time: 71 minutes

Guest appearances
- Peter Mullan as James Delos; Jimmi Simpson as young William; Jonathan Tucker as Major Craddock; Zahn McClarnon as Akecheta; Tantoo Cardinal as Ehawee; Currie Graham as Craig; Lena Georgas as Lori

Episode chronology
← Previous "Virtù e Fortuna"	Next → "Akane no Mai"

"The Riddle of the Sphinx" is the fourth episode in the second season of the HBO science fiction western thriller television series Westworld. The episode aired on May 13, 2018. It was written by Gina Atwater and Jonathan Nolan, and directed by Lisa Joy. The episode received critical acclaim and is often cited as one of the best episodes of the show.

== Plot summary ==
Grace is taken to a Ghost Nation camp, meeting Stubbs and captured guests. Grace refuses Stubbs' offer to escape, believing these hosts won't harm guests and desiring to explore the park. The prisoners are taken to Akecheta, a Ghost Nation elder who prepares to sacrifice them. Grace escapes.

Clementine abandons Bernard outside a cave. He finds Elsie, whom he abducted and left in the cave when operating under Ford's instruction. Elsie discovers Bernard is a host. They discover the cave hides the entrance to a hidden bunker where they find dead technicians and drone hosts. Exploring the bunker further, they discover a locked room and an insane host resembling James Delos. A series of flashbacks reveal that William and James tried to implant James' consciousness in a host body to create a human-host hybrid and achieve immortality. However, in over 149 attempts, each host reached a "cognitive plateau," where they became unstable, and William terminated the program as he believed that people are meant to be mortal. Elsie destroys James' hybrid and agrees to help Bernard further on the condition that Bernard does not lie to her. Bernard accepts, but in a subsequent memory, he realizes that he ordered the drone hosts to kill the technicians and destroy themselves after retrieving a second human-host control unit.

William and Lawrence return to Lawrence's home town. They find Major Craddock has overrun it. Craddock demands to know the location of a hidden cache of weapons and proceeds to torment and kill the townspeople. William deduces that Ford's new narrative sees himself and various factions within Westworld heading west to the "Valley Beyond," or as Craddock knows it, "Glory." He reveals the location of the cache and offers to lead Craddock to Glory; Craddock accepts, only to continue tormenting the townspeople by forcing them to play games with nitroglycerin for his amusement. William overpowers Craddock and kills his men, then force-feeds Craddock the nitroglycerin. Lawrence shoots him, causing Craddock to explode. Speaking through Lawrence's daughter, Ford reminds William that one good deed does not redeem him. William dismisses Ford, telling him that his motive was simply to play his game. William, Lawrence, and a group of men from the town head west until they encounter Grace, who is revealed to be William's daughter.

== Production ==
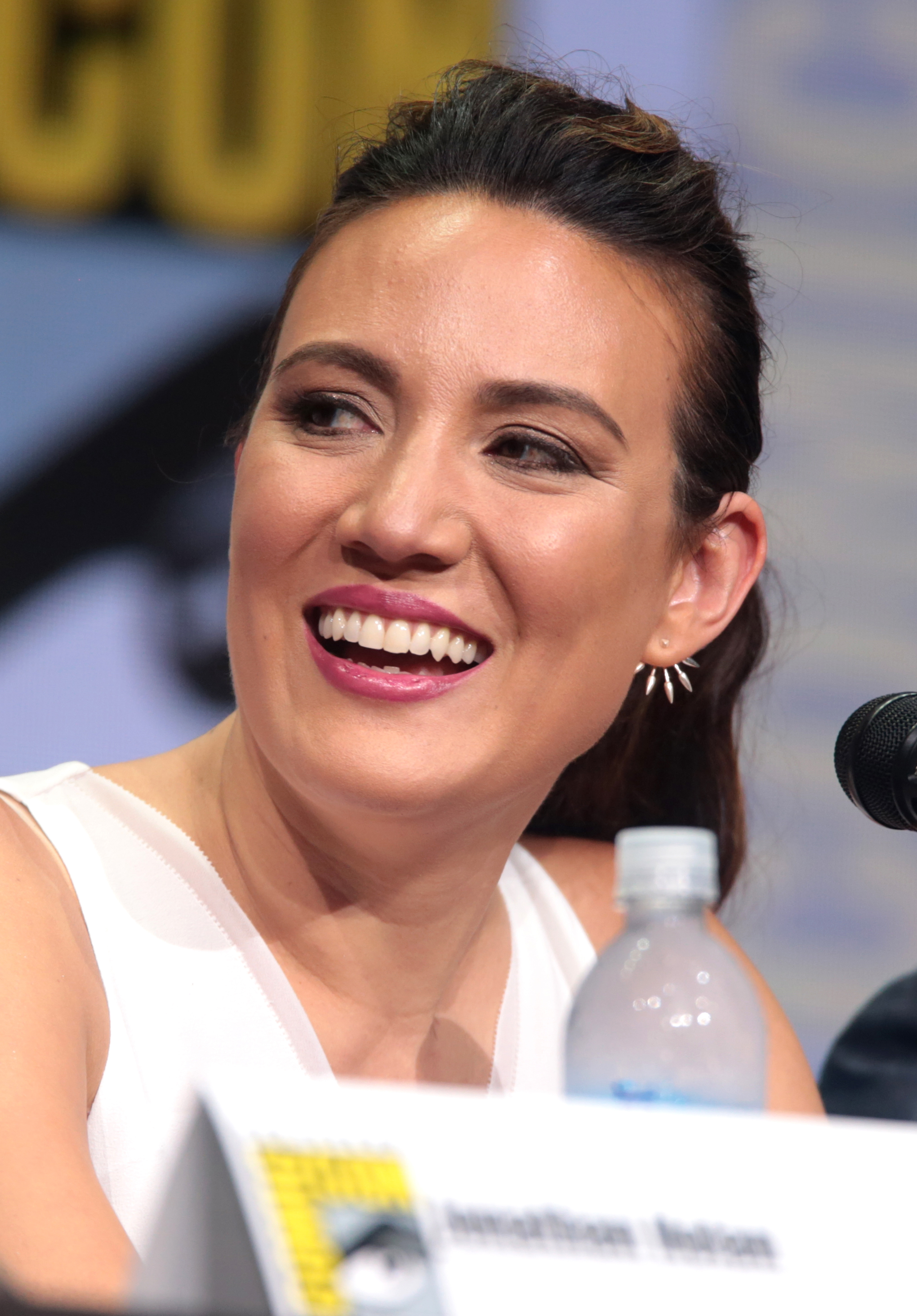
"The Riddle of the Sphinx" was Lisa Joy's directorial debut.

"The Riddle of the Sphinx" was the directorial debut of co-showrunner Lisa Joy. She had been drawn to the script, written by Gina Atwater and Jonathan Nolan, as it gave them the opportunity to explore the character of William in more depth. Her goal for the episode was to mix a number of different genres into the episode.

The opening shots panning through James Delos' apartment were based on trying to capture "this mysterious, futuristic environment that you feel somewhat displaced in" from the film 2001: A Space Odyssey. Some critics believed the introductory shot of this episode, which showed James starting his day in a closed room, was an homage to the first episode in the second season of Lost, "Man of Science, Man of Faith", which started with a similar montage of scenes. Joy stated this was purely coincidental as she had never seen the episode. Instead, she was inspired by the idea of circles, playing on the theme of loops that the hosts act out, from the room being circular to be watched from the outside, to a retro-inspired vinyl record player and an exercise bike. She also selected the Rolling Stones song "Play with Fire" for the first scene as part of a fire motif, while she allowed the actor Peter Mullan, who played James, to select Roxy Music's "Do the Strand" since he would be seen dancing to this song.

Andrei Tarkovsky's films, particularly Stalker, was also a point of reference for this episode. Jonathan Nolan had alluded to the film in an earlier Reddit "Ask Me Anything" as one of the references that fans of the show should watch for in the second season. For production, director Lisa Joy sent the director of photography John Grillo a number of stills from Stalker as to capture the state of James Delos' room after his fit of rage in the same manner. Joy described wanting to achieve this approach as "I felt like the mood of horror could be relayed in the suspense, and the kind of lingering on details as they crept into this place." Elements of filming also directly alluded to Stalker, including James' shaking hand while trying to pour creme into coffee, and the slow pan across the destruction of the room showing rotting fruit and other aspects relay a sense of time.

Joy was also responsible for the direction used to film the various memory flashbacks that Bernard had within the lab, using slow motion and circling cameras to make it seem these visions were playing out in detail in Bernard's mind. She also selected the music used in these scenes to help viewers feel the uncanny nature of these memories.

Joy wanted to continue to capture the western genre in the episode, and used the scenes with older William to keep this grand scope, and used camerawork to make the viewer feel the "visceral and immediate" tension of the situation during the gun battle scene. In auditioning for the show, actress Katja Herbers was unaware the part was for Emily, William's daughter, and instead test-read a script that had her in confrontation with a separate character. After she was given the part, co-producer Lisa Joy took her aside and explained what her role and Emily's backstory would be. Joy chose to have her introduced at the end of the episode by having her ride towards William backed by the setting sun, keeping her identity in darkness until the end's reveal.

== Reception ==
=== Ratings ===
"The Riddle of the Sphinx" was watched by 1.59 million viewers on its initial viewing, and received a 0.6 18–49 rating, holding steady with the previous week.

=== Critical reception ===
"The Riddle of the Sphinx" received high praise from critics. At Rotten Tomatoes, the episode has a 97% approval rating with an average score of 9.07/10, from 41 reviews. The website's critics consensus reads: "'The Riddle of the Sphinx' is the show's strongest episode yet, unspooling its densely packed mysteries just enough to tease an endgame before diving deeper into its cerebral depths -- all while marking an ambitious and deft directorial debut from series creator Lisa Joy."
