= The Bicameral Mind =

- Westworld episode
- Episode no.: Season 1 Episode 10
- Directed by: Jonathan Nolan
- Written by: Lisa Joy; Jonathan Nolan
- Cinematography by: David Franco
- Editing by: Andrew Seklir
- Production code: 4X6160
- Original air date: December 4, 2016
- Running time: 90 minutes

Guest appearances
- Ptolemy Slocum as Sylvester; Leonardo Nam as Felix Lutz; Talulah Riley as Angela; Steven Ogg as Rebus

Episode chronology
← Previous "The Well-Tempered Clavier"	Next → "Journey into Night"

"The Bicameral Mind" is the tenth episode and the first season finale of the HBO science fiction western thriller television series Westworld. The episode aired on December 4, 2016. The episode was directed by showrunner Jonathan Nolan and written by Nolan and Lisa Joy.

The title references bicamerality, a hypothesis about the evolution of consciousness that serves as a subtext throughout the series.

“The Bicameral Mind” was watched by 2.24 million viewers and received widespread critical acclaim, with Anthony Hopkins’ performance being praised in particular. At the 69th Primetime Emmy Awards, both Hopkins and Evan Rachel Wood submitted this episode for their nominations for Outstanding Lead Actor in a Drama Series and Outstanding Lead Actress in a Drama Series, respectively. It was additionally nominated for Outstanding Directing for a Drama Series for Nolan, and Outstanding Writing for a Drama Series for Nolan and Joy.

== Plot summary ==
The Man in Black confronts Dolores about Wyatt and, in doing so, prompts her to experience more of her memories. She recalls that Arnold had her kill all of the other hosts, then him, then herself, in an effort to stop the park from opening. The Man in Black reveals he is William. He visited the park thirty years ago with his brother-in-law Logan and continued to come in hopes that Dolores would recognize him, but was heartbroken that she never did. He stabs her, but Teddy arrives and knocks him out. When William wakes up, he sees Dr. Ford nearby and asks him about the maze. Ford says the maze was meant for the hosts, not for him, and instead invites him to the celebratory kick-off of his new narrative for the park.

Felix leads Maeve, Hector, and Armistice to cold storage so that Maeve can speak to Bernard, and she says farewell to Clementine. Bernard tells Maeve that her desire to escape is just part of her programming. She refuses to believe this and leaves with the others. As they travel through another section featuring samurai hosts, armed forces try to stop them. Armistice and Hector sacrifice themselves to let Maeve and Felix escape.

Bernard accuses Ford of resetting the hosts as soon as they show signs of consciousness. Ford counters that he has been trying to follow Arnold's vision but needed to instill the means for hosts to defend themselves should they become conscious. Arnold had done that by merging Dolores with the Wyatt personality, giving her the means to fight back. Ford leaves the gun that Dolores had killed Arnold with, telling her what she does next is up to her, and orders Bernard to follow him to the celebration. Dolores envisions herself speaking with Arnold, but realizes this is a conversation with herself; she has reached consciousness.

As Ford concludes his speech and announces the start of the narrative "Journey into Night", Dolores shoots him in the back of the head. The guests panic as she begins shooting them. At the same time, the control center loses power, and the room is locked down. Maeve, seeing a mother and daughter on the subway, leaves just before power is cut to the station. Lee goes to cold storage to find Peter but instead finds all the hosts missing.

== Production ==
"The Bicameral Mind" was written by Lisa Joy and Jonathan Nolan, and was directed by Nolan. The climax of the episode was filmed at Paramount Ranch in April 2016, with approximately 300 people on set. For that scene, Evan Rachel Wood had to repeatedly point a real gun at the back of Hopkins' head and pull the trigger. Although the gun was unloaded, it was still a "nerve-wracking" experience for her, as she was aware of the ever-present risk of accidents with firearms. The crew spent 10 days in May striking the set, which included having to modify structures installed by the filmmakers, such as the chapel, so that HBO's "intellectual property" would not be "violated."

=== Music ===
In an interview, composer Ramin Djawadi spoke about the song "Exit Music (For a Film)" by Radiohead, which he incorporated with the show's main title theme, and which is used in the final scene of the episode. Djawadi said when the hosts did wake up and started choosing their own soundtracks that "they're picking their songs, rather than the songs picked for them. They're scoring their own actions. This is what they're feeling at this moment, and what the future is holding for them. This song is the climax of that."

== Reception ==
=== Ratings ===
"The Bicameral Mind" was watched in 2.24 million US households on its initial viewing, and gained a 1.0 rating in the 18–49 demographic.

=== Critical reception ===
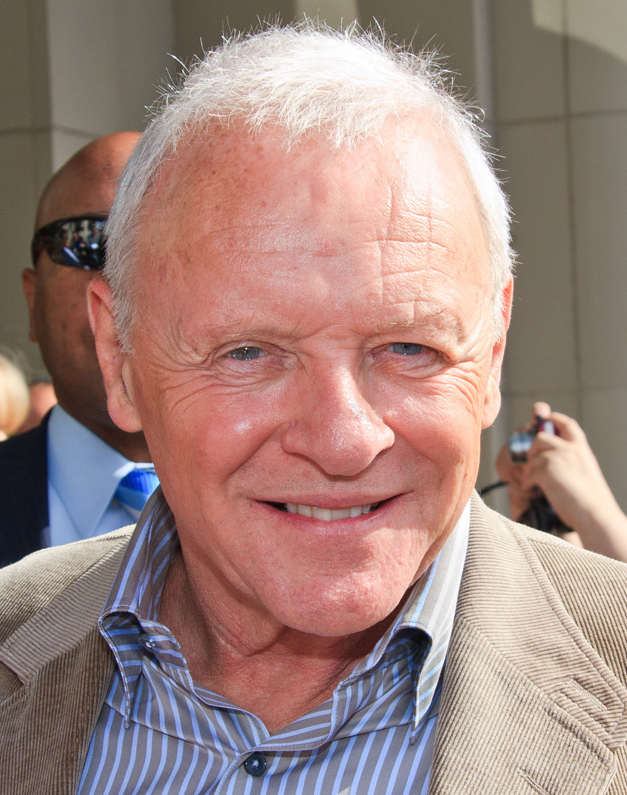
Anthony Hopkins received praise for his performance as Robert Ford.

"The Bicameral Mind" received widespread critical acclaim. The episode has a 94% score on Rotten Tomatoes and has an average rating of 8.9 out of 10, based on 32 reviews. The site's consensus reads: "'The Bicameral Mind' brings Westworld's first season to an explosive end while opening up a brave new world for the series to explore in season two."

Eric Goldman of IGN reviewed the episode positively, saying, "Maeve's big Westworld breakout was an intense, action-packed part of the finale, expertly directed by Jonathan Nolan." He gave it a score of 8.5 out of 10. Scott Tobias of The New York Times wrote in his review of the episode; "The Red Wedding-esque climax wraps up an episode that embraces the bloody, HBO-style thrills the show had been eschewing for so long. It would have been morally irresponsible to fetishize the violations against the hosts, but with the tables turned, it's possible to feel good about the humans getting their just desserts [sic]. 'The Bicameral Mind' plays that to the hilt, particularly when Hector and Armistice bust up the lab." Zack Handlen of The A.V. Club wrote in his review, "Things happened in 'The Bicameral Mind,' quite a lot of them, and some of them in the moment were exciting enough." He gave the episode a B+.

Liz Shannon Miller of IndieWire wrote in her review, "Westworld confirmed a lot of things in its extra-long finale — specifically, the fact that William's adventures in the park were from an earlier time than the rest of the narrative, and that Maeve's decision to revolt would lead to her freedom... sort of." She gave the episode a B. James Hibberd of Entertainment Weekly wrote in his review, "The more you think about this episode, the more brilliant it is." David Crow of Den of Geek said in his review, "We have opened the mystery box and found a wonderfully thoughtful gift inside. It's an elegantly formed slice of misanthropic sci-fi. It is violent, and it is delightful. A fitting Christmas present after a year like 2016, indeed." He gave the episode a 4.5 out of 5. Eric Kain of Forbes also reviewed the episode, saying, "Perhaps the biggest twist of the night was Dr. Ford's role in... well, everything. It turns out it wasn't Arnold's voice in the hosts' heads, nor was it Arnold manipulating the hosts to awaken and rebel. It was Ford all along." Emily VanDerWerff of Vox also reviewed the episode positively, calling it "brilliant television" and saying, "The finale reveals the show to not just be about the dawn of consciousness, but about the dawn of the self."

=== Accolades ===
Year	Award	Category	Nominee(s)	Result	Ref.
2017	Visual Effects Society Awards 2016	Outstanding Visual Effects in a Photoreal Episode	Jay Worth, Elizabeth Castro, Bobo Skipper, and Gustav Ahrén	Nominated	
2017	Ray Bradbury Award 2016	Best Science Fiction Screenplay	Lisa Joy and Jonathan Nolan	Nominated	
2017	Golden Reel Awards	Best Sound Editing – Long Form Dialogue and ADR in Television	Thomas E. de Gorter, Matthew Sawelson, Brian Armstrong, and Fred Paragano	Nominated	
2017	Golden Reel Awards	Best Sound Editing – Long Form Sound Effects and Foley in Television	Thomas E. de Gorter, Matthew Sawelson, Geordy Sincavage, Michael Head, Rick Owen, Tara Blume, Mark Allen, and Marc Glassman	Won	
2017	69th Primetime Emmy Awards	Outstanding Directing for a Drama Series	Jonathan Nolan	Nominated	
2017	69th Primetime Emmy Awards	Outstanding Writing for a Drama Series	Lisa Joy and Jonathan Nolan	Nominated	
2017	69th Primetime Emmy Awards	Outstanding Lead Actress in a Drama Series	Evan Rachel Wood	Nominated	
2017	69th Primetime Creative Arts Emmy Awards	Outstanding Single-Camera Picture Editing for a Drama Series	Andrew Seklir	Nominated	
2017	69th Primetime Creative Arts Emmy Awards	Outstanding Production Design for a Narrative Contemporary or Fantasy Program (One Hour or More)	Zack Grobler, Steve Christensen, and Julie Ochipinti	Nominated	
2017	69th Primetime Creative Arts Emmy Awards	Outstanding Sound Editing for a Series	Thomas E. deGorter, Matthew Sawelson, Brian Armstrong, Fred Paragano, Mark Allen, Marc Glassman, Sebastian Visconti, Geordy Sincavage, Michael Head, Christopher Kaller, Rick Owens, and Tara Blume Norton	Nominated	
2017	69th Primetime Creative Arts Emmy Awards	Outstanding Sound Mixing for a Comedy or Drama Series (One-Hour)	Keith Rogers, Scott Weber, Roger Stevenson, and Kyle O'Neal	Won	
2017	69th Primetime Creative Arts Emmy Awards	Outstanding Special Visual Effects	Jay Worth, Elizabeth Castro, Joe Wehmeyer, Eric Levin-Hatz, Bobo Skipper, Gustav Ahren, Paul Ghezzo, Mitchell S. Drain, and Michael Lantieri	Won	
