= Roberto Patino =

American screenwriter

Roberto Patino is an American screenwriter and television writer.

== Education ==
Patino graduated from Harvard University in 2006.

== Career ==
Patino is known for writing the film Cut Bank, starring Liam Hemsworth, John Malkovich, and Billy Bob Thornton. He created and served as showrunner of the HBO Max miniseries DMZ, was a writer and executive producer on the HBO series Westworld, and has written on the NBC series Prime Suspect and the FX series Sons of Anarchy. He also produced the film Backrooms.

In September 2018, he signed an overall deal with Warner Bros. Television. In November 2021, he moved his overall deal to Netflix.
