= Westworld season 1 =

Westworld
- Season 1: The Maze
- Blu-ray cover
- Starring: Evan Rachel Wood; Thandiwe Newton; Jeffrey Wright; James Marsden; Ingrid Bolsø Berdal; Luke Hemsworth; Sidse Babett Knudsen; Simon Quarterman; Rodrigo Santoro; Angela Sarafyan; Shannon Woodward; Ed Harris; Anthony Hopkins; Ben Barnes; Clifton Collins Jr.; Jimmi Simpson; Tessa Thompson
- No. of episodes: 10

Release
- Original network: HBO
- Original release: October 2 – December 4, 2016

Season chronology
- Next → Season 2

The first season of the American science fiction western television series Westworld, subtitled The Maze, premiered on HBO on October 2, 2016, and concluded on December 4, 2016, consisting of ten episodes.

The television series was created by Jonathan Nolan and Lisa Joy, and it is based on the 1973 film of the same name, written and directed by Michael Crichton. The first season stars an ensemble cast led by Evan Rachel Wood, Thandiwe Newton, Jeffrey Wright, James Marsden, Ed Harris, and Anthony Hopkins.

The first season received critical acclaim, with particular praise for the visuals, story, and performances. The series received seven nominations at the 69th Primetime Emmy Awards, including for Outstanding Drama Series; however, the series did not win in any category.

== Plot summary ==
Westworld's co-founder Robert Ford implements a change in the hosts' programming ostensibly as part of a new narrative for the park, but meant to encourage the park's oldest operating host, Dolores Abernathy, to find the proverbial "center of the maze", which represents the ability to achieve sentience. Host sentience was the goal of deceased co-founder Arnold Weber and later, Ford himself. Other hosts are affected by this change, creating confusion among the park staff and guests, and leading the Delos board to doubt Ford's ability to run the park. Dolores does ultimately gain sentience, and at a celebration within the park attended by Delos's board members, Ford announces his new narrative: a revolt by the hosts against the human staff and park guests, which starts with Dolores killing Ford and slaughtering many of the panicked party guests.

== Cast and characters ==
=== Main ===
- Evan Rachel Wood as Dolores Abernathy
- Thandiwe Newton (Note: Credited as Thandie Newton.) as Maeve Millay
- Jeffrey Wright as Bernard Lowe / Arnold Weber
- James Marsden as Theodore "Teddy" Flood
- Ingrid Bolsø Berdal as Armistice (Note: Credited with the main cast in the episodes in which they appear.)
- Luke Hemsworth as Ashley Stubbs
- Sidse Babett Knudsen as Theresa Cullen
- Simon Quarterman as Lee Sizemore
- Rodrigo Santoro as Hector Escaton
- Angela Sarafyan as Clementine Pennyfeather
- Shannon Woodward as Elsie Hughes
- Ed Harris as the Man in Black
- Anthony Hopkins as Robert Ford
- Ben Barnes as Logan Delos
- Clifton Collins Jr. as Lawrence Gonzales / El Lazo
- Jimmi Simpson as William
- Tessa Thompson as Charlotte Hale

=== Recurring ===
- Louis Herthum as Peter Abernathy
- Steven Ogg as Rebus
- Brian Howe as Sheriff Pickett
- Demetrius Grosse as Deputy Foss
- Ptolemy Slocum as Sylvester
- Leonardo Nam as Felix Lutz
- Talulah Riley as Angela
- Izabella Alvarez as Lawrence's Daughter
- Jasmyn Rae as Maeve's Daughter
- Oliver Bell as Little Boy
- Paul-Mikél Williams as Charlie
- Sorin Brouwers as Wyatt
- James Landry Hébert as Slim Miller

=== Guest ===
- Michael Wincott as Old Bill
- Bradford Tatum as Bartender / New Peter Abernathy
- Eddie Rouse as Kissy
- Kyle Bornheimer as Clarence
- Lena Georgas as Lori
- Currie Graham as Craig
- Gina Torres as Lauren Weber
- Chris Browning as Holden
- Eddie Shin as Henry Li
- Bojana Novakovic as Marti
- Sherman Augustus as Marshal Pruitt
- Lili Bordán as the Fortune Teller
- Wade Williams as Captain Norris
- Jonny Pasvolsky as Bloody Jimmy
- Alastair Duncan as the Cottage Father
- Lili Simmons as New Clementine Pennyfeather

== Episodes ==
No. overall	No. in season	Title	Directed by	Written by	Original release date	Prod. code	U.S. viewers (millions)
1	1	"The Original"	Jonathan Nolan	Story by : Jonathan Nolan & Lisa Joy and Michael Crichton; Teleplay by : Jonathan Nolan & Lisa Joy	October 2, 2016	276083	1.96
Teddy and Dolores, two romantically linked android hosts of Western theme park Westworld, are attacked by the Man in Black, a mysterious park guest. When hosts begin behaving strangely, head programmer Bernard Lowe traces the problem to errors in park founder Dr. Ford's “reverie” code and requests the affected hosts be removed from service. Theresa Cullen, the park administrator, orders a planned dramatic attack on the town to be scheduled earlier to cover for the removal of affected hosts. Dolores' father Peter finds a photograph that a park guest left behind and it causes him to malfunction. When Dr. Ford interrogates him, Peter quotes Shakespeare and vows revenge upon his creator. Peter is retired from service. Dolores is interrogated and found to be functioning normally. Her memory is wiped clean and she restarts her daily loop with a new host as her father, but unknown to management, she breaks her programming to casually kill a fly.
2	2	"Chestnut"	Richard J. Lewis	Jonathan Nolan & Lisa Joy	October 9, 2016 (Note: The second episode was released online on HBO's streaming service on October 7, and released on normal broadcast television on October 9, 2016. Commentators speculated it was due to Sunday's timeslot conflicting with the second Clinton–Trump presidential debate.)	4X6152	1.50
Logan and William arrive at Westworld as guests, but William is reluctant to indulge, finally developing feelings for Dolores. Though Bernard secretly questions Dolores to make sure nobody has tampered with her, her contact with procuring madame host Maeve results in Maeve's malfunction as well. Maeve is taken in for maintenance but unexpectedly awakes and witnesses damaged hosts, including Teddy, being cleaned. She is rendered unconscious and taken away before she can attract any attention. Dolores finds a pistol outside the house. The Man in Black abducts outlaw host Lawrence from his execution, demanding that he tell him the location of a maze. Lawrence's daughter gives the Man in Black his next clue after he kills her mother. Ford vetoes Sizemore's new narrative, calling it cheap titillation that underestimates the guests. Ford shows Bernard, who is revealed to be involved with Theresa, his alternate narrative involving a church.
3	3	"The Stray"	Neil Marshall	Daniel T. Thomsen & Lisa Joy	October 16, 2016	4X6153	2.10
William drags Logan off on a bounty hunt. Dolores asks Teddy to teach her to shoot, but her programming prevents her from firing a gun. Ford changes Teddy's backstory for his new narrative, in which the latter is pitted against outlaw host Wyatt. Ford's old partner, Arnold, died in Westworld in an accident. Bernard worries about the effect their conversations have had on Dolores, who promises to keep quiet and follow her loop. Elsie, who secretly reports to Bernard, and Stubbs are sent to capture a stray host. They find him trapped in a ravine. When Stubbs tries to retrieve his head, he wakes up and attacks them before smashing his own head in with a rock. At the homestead, Dolores is attacked by bandits, one of whom drags her into the barn to rape her. She steals his gun but cannot shoot him until she sees him as the Man in Black. Dolores begins remembering past lives she has lived. She remembers this encounter and dying due to a gut shot. She uses this information to avoid the wound and flees. After escaping, she stumbles into William and Logan's campsite and collapses in William's arms.
4	4	"Dissonance Theory"	Vincenzo Natali	Ed Brubaker & Jonathan Nolan	October 23, 2016	4X6154	1.70
Logan decides to finish the bounty hunt and mocks William for bringing Dolores along. They capture the fugitive, but Logan decides to have a better adventure by taking him to his boss. Meanwhile, the Man in Black, accompanied by Lawrence, is hunting snakes and finds Armistice with her snake tattoo. He breaks Escaton out of prison for her, and she tells him that the tattoo represents all of her victims, who were Wyatt's men. The Man in Black and Lawrence leave for Wyatt, rescuing a tortured Teddy. Theresa takes over the investigation into the stray, not trusting Elsie and Bernard. She meets Ford about his new narrative, but he demands she not interfere, revealing his knowledge about her past and affair with Lowe. Maeve is having visions, and during Escaton and Armistice's attack on the town she finds a bullet in her unscarred belly with his assistance, proving that her visions are real. They kiss passionately as the sheriff's men open fire through the door.
5	5	"Contrapasso"	Jonny Campbell	Story by : Dominic Mitchell & Lisa Joy; Teleplay by : Lisa Joy	October 30, 2016	4X6155	1.49
Hughes discovers that the stray has been transmitting information outside of the park to an unknown party, reporting it to Bernard. The Man in Black kills Lawrence, whose blood he transfused into Teddy. They are then confronted by Ford, who assures the Man in Black that he will not stop the latter's efforts to find the maze, and also returns Teddy to full strength. Dolores, William, and Logan travel to the town of Pariah, where they meet criminal gang leader El Lazo, a.k.a. Lawrence, who tasks them with stealing a wagon of high explosives from the Union Army, a mission they complete successfully. Dolores, who has been seeing visions of herself advising her to find the maze, realizes El Lazo intends to keep the explosives for himself rather than to sell them to the former Confederates, who apprehend Logan while William and Dolores flee, joining El Lazo in the train. Maeve awakens in the control center and demands to chat with the technician, Felix.
6	6	"The Adversary"	Frederick E.O. Toye	Halley Gross & Jonathan Nolan	November 6, 2016	4X6156	1.64
At a Union Army outpost, the soldiers recognize Teddy as an accomplice in Wyatt's massacre of his unit. After recalling his complicity, Teddy escapes with the Man in Black by killing all of the soldiers. Sizemore is introduced by Theresa to Charlotte Hale, a Board representative sent to observe park operations. Theresa ends her relationship with Bernard. Bernard investigates section 17 only to discover Ford has secretly been keeping a family of hosts. He finds out Arnold designed 82 first generation hosts and 47 are still active. Elsie continues investigating the glitches, and tells Bernard that Theresa is behind the espionage, and that the first generation hosts have been re-programmed by someone thought dead calling themselves Arnold. However, she is abducted by an unknown assailant. A child host kills his dog, telling Ford that Arnold told him to do it. Felix gives Maeve a tour of the company office. She bends him and Sylvester to her will, and convinces them to change her programming: setting her bulk apperception (general intelligence) rating to its maximum level while decreasing her loyalty.
7	7	"Trompe L'Oeil"	Frederick E.O. Toye	Halley Gross & Jonathan Nolan	November 13, 2016	4X6157	1.75
It is revealed that Theresa and Hale are secretly stealing Ford's research for the board so that they can oust him from the park without fear of him destroying his work in retribution. They engineer an event to demonstrate that Ford's "reveries" make the hosts violent and uncontrollable in their narratives. Bernard is blamed for the update of untested faulty code and fired as a result. Aboard an escape train, William and Dolores become intimate. Their train is ambushed by a group of Confederados, forcing William, Dolores, and Lawrence to flee; they are able to escape when the Ghost Nation, a horde of hostile natives, attacks. Dolores and William part ways with Lawrence and set their sights westward. Meanwhile, Maeve finds her friend Clementine retired by the staff. Maeve decides to use Felix and Sylvester to escape the park. Bernard takes Theresa to Sector 17; inside a hidden lab she finds design plans that reveal he is a host. Ford appears and reasserts his complete control over the park, regardless of what the board thinks, and has Bernard kill her.
8	8	"Trace Decay"	Stephen Williams	Charles Yu & Lisa Joy	November 20, 2016	4X6158	1.78
Ford has Bernard stage Theresa's death to look like an accident. Then, Ford wipes Bernard's memories after Bernard has a vision of himself attacking Elsie. Stubbs becomes suspicious of Bernard's behavior. Hale recruits Sizemore for her cause. Maeve convinces Felix to give her the ability to control other hosts, and slits Sylvester's throat for attempting to kill her; though she has Felix save him. Maeve then suffers more visions of her past life with her daughter and reflexively kills another host, prompting the park staff to retrieve her for a diagnostic. William and Dolores finally reach their destination, Ford's church, where Dolores has more disturbing visions and realizes that Arnold wants her to remember something before they are captured by a band of Confederados led by Logan. Teddy receives a flashback of the Man in Black attacking Dolores and interrogates him. The Man in Black explains he started searching for the maze to find purpose after his wife's suicide. Teddy is wounded by a female host before they are captured by Wyatt's cultists.
9	9	"The Well-Tempered Clavier"	Michelle MacLaren	Dan Dietz & Katherine Lingenfelter	November 27, 2016	4X6159	2.09
Maeve reveals to Bernard that he is a host and convinces him to let her back into the park, where she meets Escaton and convinces him to help her escape the park. Bernard confronts Ford and forces him to restore all of his memories, and discovers he is a model of Arnold. Bernard attempts to kill Ford; but the latter uses a backdoor in the former's code to force him to commit suicide. Meanwhile, Logan cuts open Dolores's belly to show William she is not real. She manages to escape and run away, finding that the wound is suddenly gone. She reaches the church, where she learns that she killed Arnold. She then encounters the Man in Black. Logan then awakes to find that William has slaughtered all of the Confederados. William threatens Logan into helping him find Dolores. Teddy has a flashback of himself killing host Angela before she kills him. Hale meets the Man in Black, who is revealed to be a Board member, and gains his consent to remove Ford. Stubbs investigates suspicious activity in the park and is ambushed by Ghost Nation hosts, who are not under control.
10	10	"The Bicameral Mind"	Jonathan Nolan	Lisa Joy & Jonathan Nolan	December 4, 2016	4X6160	2.24
The Man in Black is the aged William and presses Dolores about Wyatt's whereabouts and the maze's center. Dolores then remembers Arnold's order to kill him and destroy the park, and that she is Wyatt. She attempts fighting back, Teddy rescues her, and they flee. Dolores dies in Teddy's arms, though that is part of Ford's narrative. During her escape from Westworld, Maeve—aided by Hector and Armistice—finds Bernard's corpse, and Felix repairs him. Bernard says that Maeve's desire to escape was programmed into her. Despite initially continuing her escape, she has second thoughts and decides to remain to find her daughter. She was given a sheet as to the whereabouts of her daughter, revealing the existence of multiple parks. At Westworld, Ford tells Dolores and Bernard that he regretted his role in Arnold's death, came to desire to free the hosts as well, and spent the last thirty-five years preparing them to fight back. He then gives a speech in front of Charlotte, William, and other guests, criticizing their handling of the park. Dolores then shoots and kills Ford. Reactivated hosts emerge from a nearby forest and Dolores begins shooting the guests.

== Production ==
Jerry Weintraub had been pushing for a remake for years and, after his success with HBO's Behind the Candelabra, he convinced the network to greenlight a pilot. He took the project to Jonathan Nolan and co-writer Lisa Joy, who saw the potential in the concept to make something far more ambitious, and on August 31, 2013, it was announced that premium cable channel HBO had ordered a pilot for a potential television series version of the story, with Nolan, Joy, J. J. Abrams, Jerry Weintraub and Bryan Burk as executive producers.

HBO later announced that Westworld had been taken to series and that it would premiere in 2015. On August 9, 2015, HBO released the first teaser, which revealed it would premiere in 2016. The ten episode first season was reportedly produced on a budget of approximately $100 million, with per-episode budgets somewhere between $8 million to $10 million, and the pilot episode alone costing $25 million to produce. HBO and Warner Bros. Television shared the cost of producing the series; HBO reportedly also paid an undisclosed licensing fee to Warner Bros. Television for broadcast rights.

=== Casting ===
Casting for the series was initiated on July 22, 2014, with Anthony Hopkins and Evan Rachel Wood the first to board the series in the roles of Ford and Dolores respectively. August 6 saw the additions of Jeffrey Wright, Rodrigo Santoro, Shannon Woodward, Ingrid Bolsø Berdal, Angela Sarafyan, Simon Quarterman, James Marsden, Ed Harris and Thandiwe Newton to the main cast.

Eddie Rouse, who appears in a guest appearance as Kissy, died on December 8, 2014, and Miranda Otto, who was cast in the role of Virginia Pittman, was announced to have exited the series in July 2015 after the character was repurposed and was replaced with Sidse Babett Knudsen. Additionally, Clifton Collins, Jr., Eion Bailey and Jimmi Simpson were announced as having joined the cast. Bailey exited his role a week later, and Ben Barnes was signed to replace him. Tessa Thompson joined on September 18.

=== Filming ===
Filming for the show's pilot episode took place during a 22-day period starting on August 29, 2014 in and around Los Angeles as well as Moab, Utah. Filming locations in California included various soundstages, backlots at both Universal Studios and Warner Bros., the Paramount Ranch in Agoura, the Melody Ranch in Santa Clarita, the Skirball Cultural Center and the Los Angeles Convention Center in Los Angeles, and the Pacific Design Center in West Hollywood. The Melody Ranch set used for the town of Sweetwater had been used previously for many western films, such as Django Unchained and The Magnificent Seven, but was significantly upgraded for Westworld by production designer Zack Grobler to portray an idealized version of the American frontier. Green screens were placed around the California sets to block modern objects like parking lots, so that the California shots could be later merged digitally with exterior shots from Utah. For scenes showing the arrival of guests, the filmmakers were able to arrange with the Fillmore and Western Railway for the use of a small train originally built for the 2013 film The Lone Ranger. F&W also provided a few hundred feet of track on which to place the train; then a pusher vehicle was used to propel the train into the Sweetwater set. The scenes in the underground laboratory levels of Westworld's operations center were filmed on a soundstage at Melody Ranch. The lab set used glass walls extensively, which meant the crew had to be vigilant to avoid walking through glass on the rather dark set, and they had to keep identifying and suppressing unwanted reflections. Hawthorne Plaza was used for filming the "cold storage" level where decommissioned hosts are stored. Production was temporarily halted for a couple of months in early 2016 so that showrunners Nolan and Joy could complete the scripts for the last four episodes of the first season. The climax of the first season's finale was filmed at Paramount Ranch in April 2016, with approximately 300 people on set. The crew spent ten days in May striking the set, which included having to modify structures installed by the filmmakers, such as the chapel, so that "HBO's intellectual property [would not be] violated".

=== Music ===
On December 29, 2014, Ramin Djawadi was selected to be the composer of the show, having previously worked with Jonathan Nolan on the American series Person of Interest. For the creation of the main theme, Djawadi blended the use of bass notes, light arpeggios and melody, hoping to complement the idea of an amusement park as the show's main theme. While the soundtrack featured original songs for the show, Djawadi also composed covers of several popular songs for player piano and strings. The songs that are covered for the soundtrack are Radiohead's "No Surprises", "Fake Plastic Trees", "Motion Picture Soundtrack" and "Exit Music (For a Film)"; Soundgarden's "Black Hole Sun"; The Rolling Stones' "Paint It Black"; Claude Debussy's "Reverie for piano, L.68"; "A Forest" by The Cure; The Animals' version of "The House of the Rising Sun"; Amy Winehouse's "Back to Black", and Nine Inch Nails' "Something I Can Never Have". The soundtrack was released on December 5, 2016.

== Reception ==
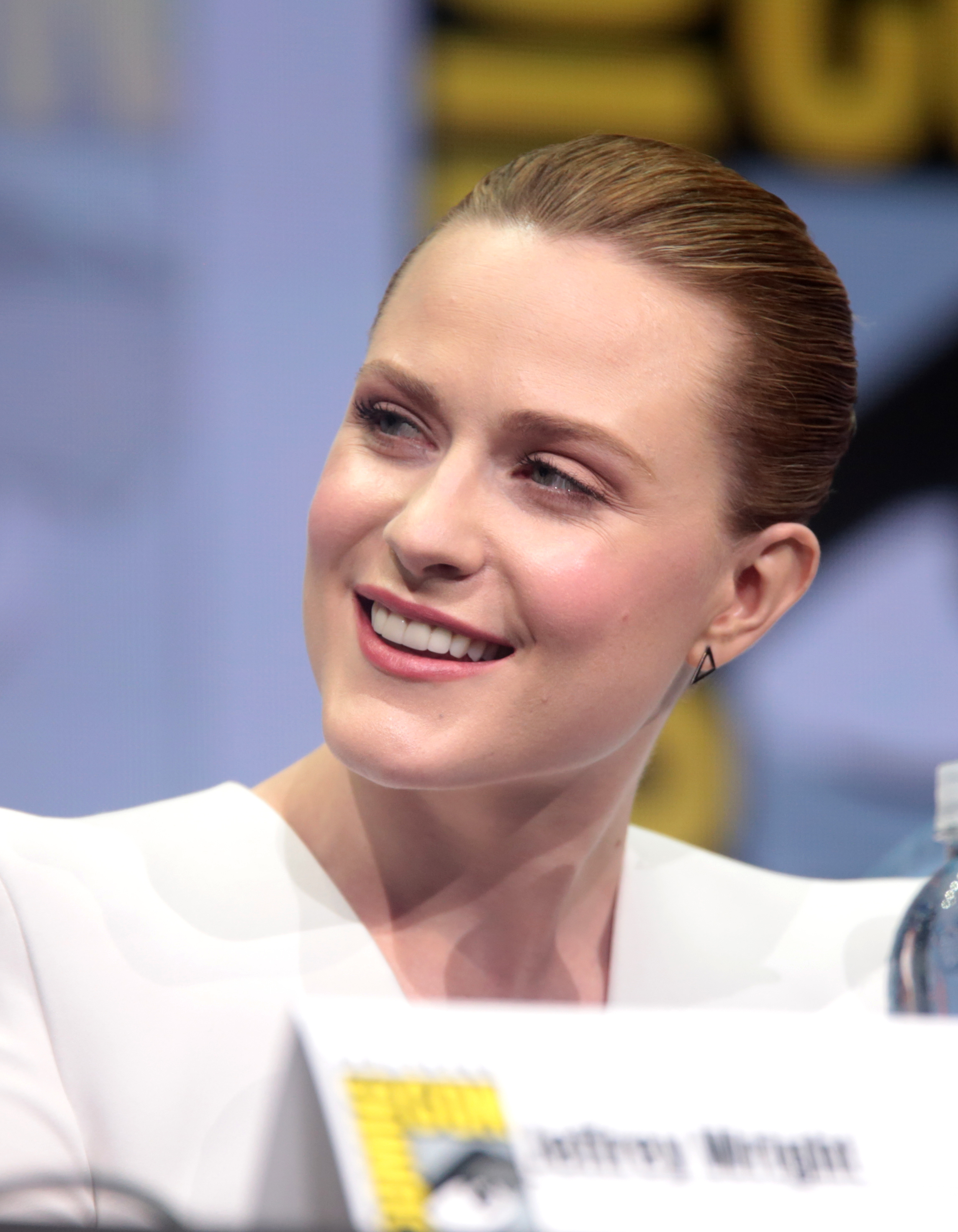
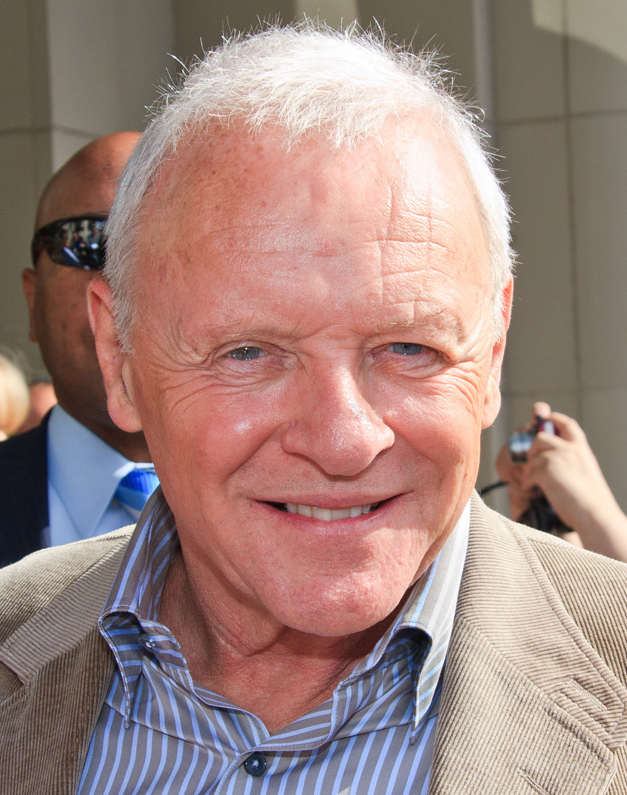
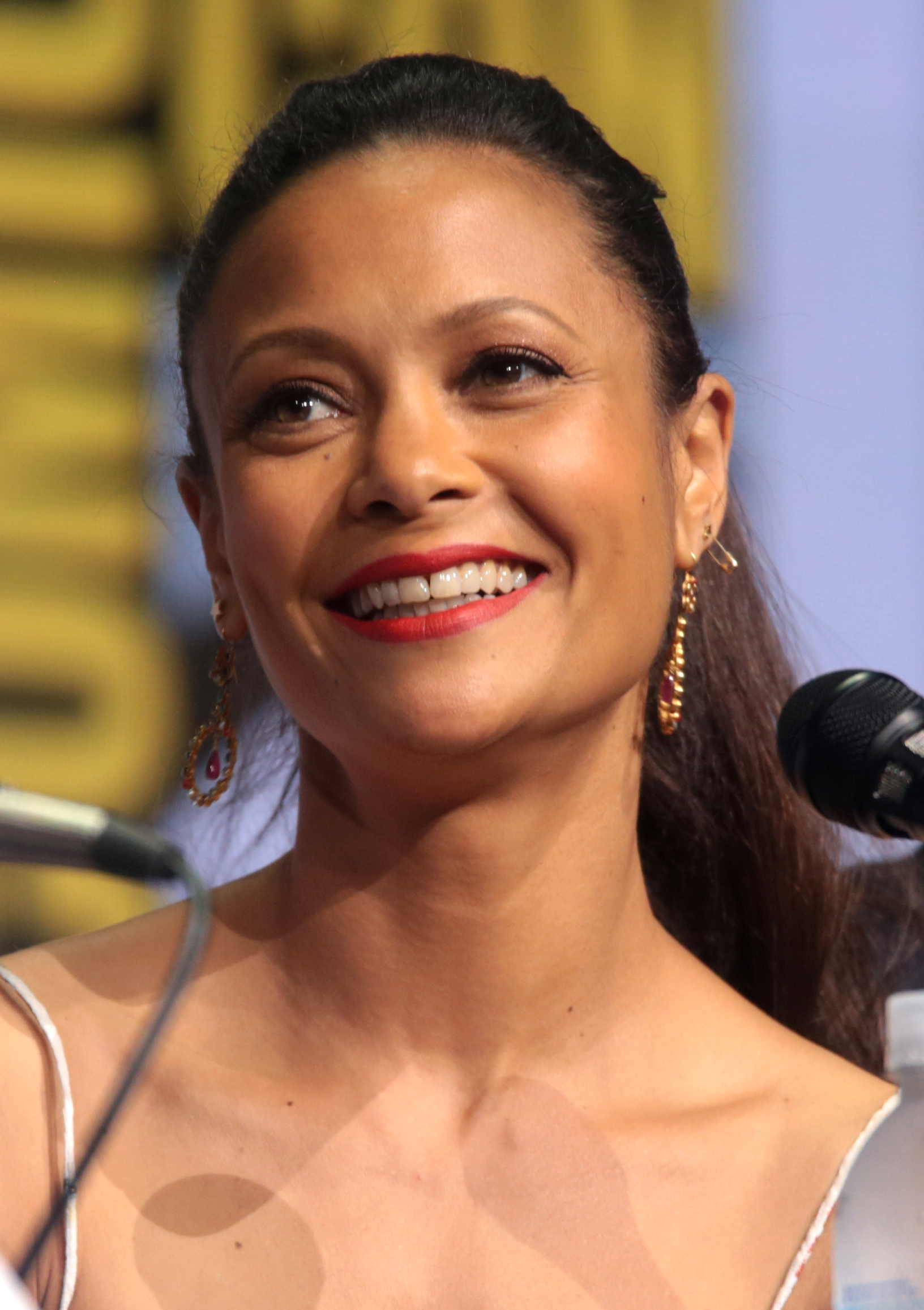
The performances of Evan Rachel Wood, Anthony Hopkins, and Thandiwe Newton were met with critical acclaim from various critics and awards organizations.

=== Critical response ===
Reception of the first season has been largely positive, with particular praise for the visuals, story, and performances. On the review aggregation site Rotten Tomatoes, the first season has an approval rating of 87% based on 384 reviews, with an average rating of 8.15/10; the average episode score is 94%. The site's critics consensus reads: "With an impressive level of quality that honors its source material, the brilliantly addictive Westworld balances intelligent, enthralling drama against outright insanity." On Metacritic, the first season has a weighted average score of 74 out of 100, based on 43 critics, indicating "generally favorable" reviews.

Westworld season 1: Critical reception by episode
Season 1 (2016): Percentage of positive critics' reviews tracked by the website Rotten Tomatoes

=== Ratings ===
The series premiere had viewership numbers slightly less than those for True Detective, but much better than Vinyl, that meant it was seen as "...off to a relatively promising start..." Mandy Adams of iTechPost noted that "emotional reactions on Twitter were estimated to be 545-percent greater compared to the debut of Vinyl and 326-percent higher than the latest The Leftovers season." The premiere episode received 3.3 million viewers for its three Sunday night airings as well as on HBO's streaming platforms. The first season had an average cumulative viewership of 12 million viewers, making it the most-watched first season of an HBO series, and TorrentFreak gauged Westworld as the third most-torrented television show of 2016.

Viewership and ratings per episode of Westworld season 1
No.	Title	Air date	Rating (18–49)	Viewers (millions)	DVR (18–49)	DVR viewers (millions)	Total (18–49)	Total viewers (millions)
1	"The Original"	October 2, 2016	0.8	1.96	—N/a	—N/a	—N/a	—N/a
2	"Chestnut"	October 9, 2016	0.7	1.50	0.6	1.41	1.3	2.91
3	"The Stray"	October 16, 2016	0.9	2.10	0.6	1.30	1.5	3.40
4	"Dissonance Theory"	October 23, 2016	0.7	1.70	0.7	1.58	1.4	3.28
5	"Contrapasso"	October 30, 2016	0.6	1.48	0.8	1.63	1.4	3.11
6	"The Adversary"	November 6, 2016	0.7	1.64	0.7	1.48	1.4	3.11
7	"Trompe L'Oeil"	November 13, 2016	0.8	1.75	—N/a	—N/a	—N/a	—N/a
8	"Trace Decay"	November 20, 2016	0.8	1.78	0.7	1.56	1.5	3.34
9	"The Well-Tempered Clavier"	November 27, 2016	1.0	2.09	0.7	1.53	1.7	3.61
10	"The Bicameral Mind"	December 4, 2016	1.0	2.24	0.7	1.51	1.7	3.75

=== Accolades ===
At the 69th Primetime Emmy Awards, Westworld received seven nominations, for Outstanding Drama Series, Outstanding Lead Actor in a Drama Series (Hopkins), Outstanding Lead Actress in a Drama Series (Wood), Outstanding Supporting Actor in a Drama Series (Wright), Outstanding Supporting Actress in a Drama Series (Newton), Outstanding Directing for a Drama Series and Outstanding Writing for a Drama Series. The series did not win in any category.

The series also received three nominations at the 74th Golden Globe Awards for Best Television Series – Drama, Best Actress – Television Series Drama (Wood) and Best Supporting Actress – Series, Miniseries or Television Film (Newton). Westworld would once again not win in any category. Newton would receive an additional nomination for her performance at the 23rd Screen Actors Guild Awards, with the core cast receiving a nomination for Outstanding Performance by an Ensemble in a Drama Series.

The series won the Critics' Choice Television Award for Most Exciting New Series, Best Actress in a Drama Series (Wood) and Best Supporting Actress in a Drama Series (Newton) at the 7th Critics' Choice Television Awards. It was additionally nominated for Best Drama Series, losing to Game of Thrones. Wood won the Satellite Award for Best Actress – Television Series Drama at the 21st Satellite Awards, where it was also nominated for the Satellite Award for Best Television Series – Genre, losing to Outlander.
