= Westworld: Season 1 (soundtrack) =

Soundtrack album by Ramin Djawadi
- Released: December 5, 2016
- Recorded: 2014–2016
- Genre: Soundtrack
- Length: 103:57
- Label: WaterTower Music
- Producer: Ramin Djawadi

Ramin Djawadi soundtrack chronology
Game of Thrones: Season 6 (2016)	Westworld: Season 1 (2016)	The Great Wall (2016)

Westworld: Season 1 is the first soundtrack of the American television series Westworld, composed by Ramin Djawadi. Released on December 5, 2016, the album includes thirty-four pieces composed or arranged for the show. The album contains mostly original compositions by Djawadi, it also includes some covers by him of Radiohead, The Rolling Stones, Soundgarden, The Animals, and The Cure. The soundtrack has received favorable reviews and peaked at #190 on the U.S. Billboard 200 chart. It was nominated for International Film Music Critics Association for "Best Original Score for a Television Series".

An EP titled Westworld: Season 1 (Selections from the HBO Series), containing the tracks "Main Title Theme – Westworld", "Black Hole Sun", "Paint It Black", "No Surprises", and "A Forest", was released in advance on October 31, 2016.

== Track listing ==
All music by Ramin Djawadi, except where noted.

No.	Title	Key scenes/Notes	Length
1.	"Main Title Theme - Westworld"	Used for the opening credits sequence.	1:41
2.	"Sweetwater" (Theme for the Park)	"The Original": Variations with different instrumentation are heard for other parks in Season 2.	2:53
3.	"Black Hole Sun"	"The Original": The track is a piano arrangement of the song of the same name by Soundgarden.	2:29
4.	"Paint It Black"	"The Original": The track is an orchestral arrangement of the song of the same name by The Rolling Stones.	5:44
5.	"This World" (Theme for Dolores)	"The Original"	2:29
6.	"Online"	"The Original": A soft electronic variation of "Sweetwater".	4:19
7.	"No Surprises"	"Chestnut" The track is a piano arrangement of the song of the same name by Radiohead.	4:02
8.	"Dr. Ford"	"Chestnut": Phrase A is Dr. Ford's personal theme. Phrase B is a theme for coding and the new narrative.	5:30
9.	"A Forest"	"Dissonance Theory": The track is a piano arrangement of the song of the same name by The Cure.	2:48
10.	"Reveries"	"Chestnut" A soft electronic variation of "Dr. Ford".	3:00
11.	"Nitro Heist"	"The Stray": An upbeat, action-like variation of "Sweetwater".	3:31
12.	"Motion Picture Soundtrack"	"The Adversary": The track is a piano arrangement of the song of the same name composed by Vitamin String Quartet of a song by Radiohead	2:42
13.	"Freeze All Motor Functions"	"The Adversary": Maeve's rebellion theme.	3:03
14.	"Pariah"	"Contrapasso": A decadent variation of "Sweetwater".	3:08
15.	"Fake Plastic Trees"	"The Adversary": The track is a piano arrangement of the song of the same name by Radiohead.	2:14
16.	"MIB" (Man in Black's theme)	"The Original"	3:06
17.	"The Maze"	"Chestnut": The second half develops a melody associated with the search for The Maze.	4:05
18.	"House of the Rising Sun"	"Trace Decay": The track is a piano arrangement of the song of the same name by The Animals.	1:24
19.	"Trompe L'Oeil"	"The Bicameral Mind"	5:04
20.	"What Does This Mean" (Maeve's theme)	"Contrapasso"	3:04
21.	"Something I Can Never Have"	"Contrapasso": The track is a piano arrangement of the song of the same name composed by Vitamin String Quartet of a song by Nine Inch Nails.
22.	"White Hats"	"Chestnut"	2:27
23.	"Back to Black"	"Trace Decay": The track is a piano arrangement of the song of the same name by Amy Winehouse.	1:58
24.	"No One's Controlling Me"	"Contrapasso": Contains an electronic variation of "This World".	1:59
25.	"Memories"	"The Well-Tempered Clavier": A motif heavily associated with Maeve's previous build, but also to reminiscence in general.	3:44
26.	"No Surprises" (stride piano)	"Chestnut": Cover of a song by Radiohead	2:37
27.	"Violent Delights"	"The Bicameral Mind": An electronic variation of "Sweetwater".	4:58
28.	"Someday"	"The Bicameral Mind": A variation of "This World".	3:40
29.	"Sweetwater Stride"	"The Original"	0:41
30.	"Do They Dream"	"Chestnut": A variation of "Memories".	1:48
31.	"The Stray"	"The Stray": Contains a motif associated with the intrigue that develops inside the Mesa.	2:18
32.	"Bicameral Mind"	"The Bicameral Mind"	4:25
33.	"Exit Music (For a Film)"	"The Bicameral Mind": The track is an orchestral arrangement of the song of the same name by Radiohead.	4:26
34.	"Rêverie"	"The Stray": Orchestral arrangement of Debussy's piano piece of the same name, L¹. 68.	1:42
Total length:			103:57

== Charts ==
Chart (2016)	Peak position
US Billboard 200	190

== Awards and nominations ==
Year	Award	Category	Nominee(s)	Result	Ref.
2016	International Film Music Critics Association	Best Original Score for a Television Series		Nominated	
2017	69th Primetime Creative Arts Emmy Awards	Outstanding Original Main Title Theme Music		Nominated	

== See also ==
- Piano roll
- Ragtime
