= Ed Brubaker =

American comic book writer

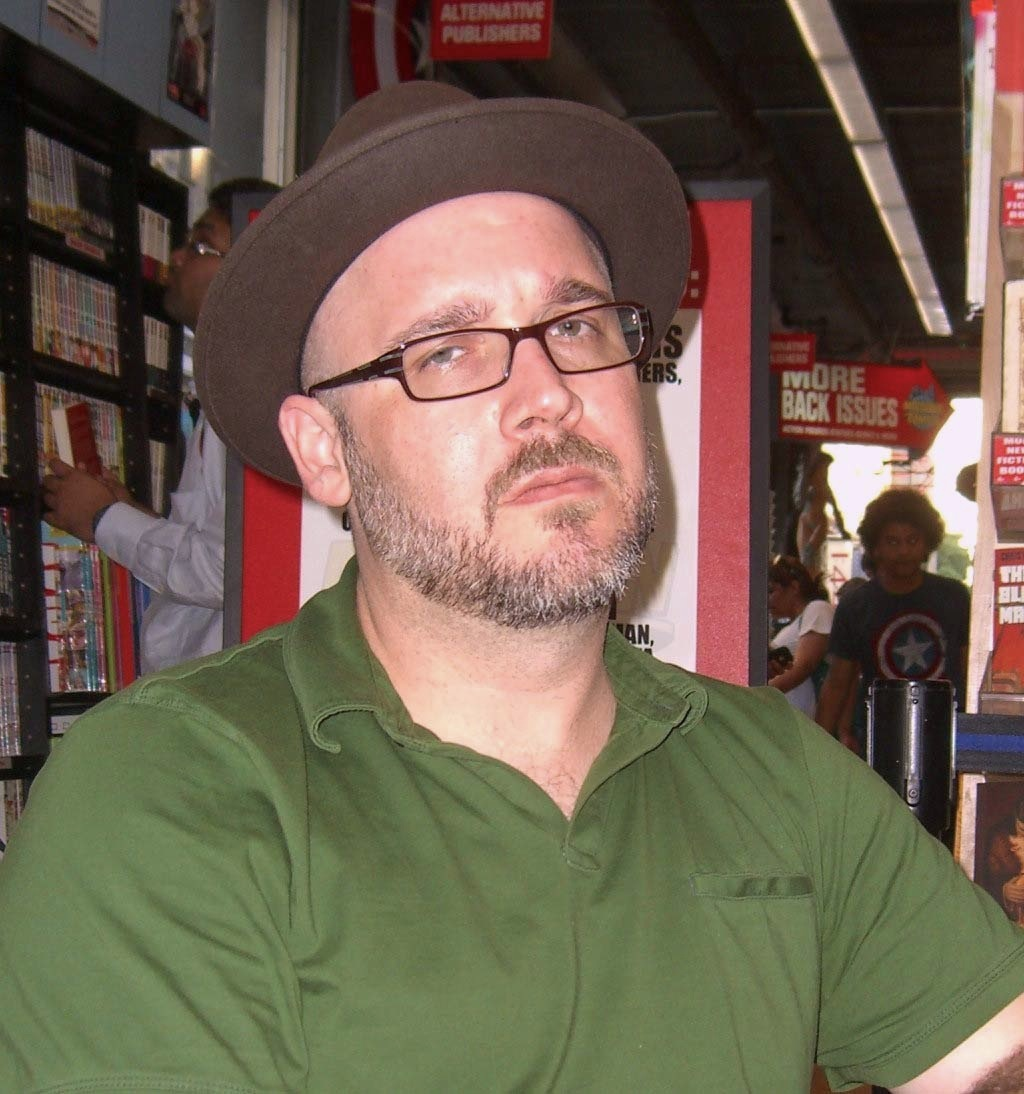
- Brubaker at a book signing at Midtown Comics Times Square in 2010
- Born: November 17, 1966 (age 60) Bethesda, Maryland, U.S.
- Areas: Writer, artist
- Notable works: Lowlife; Scene of the Crime; Batman; Catwoman; Gotham Central; Sleeper; Captain America; Uncanny X-Men; Daredevil; Criminal; Fatale; Kill or Be Killed; Too Old to Die Young
- Awards: Harvey Award, 2006, 2007; Eisner Award, 2007, 2008, 2010, 2012, 2015, 2016, 2019

Ed Brubaker (/ˈbruːbeɪkər/; born November 17, 1966) is an American comic book writer, cartoonist and screenwriter who works primarily in the crime fiction genre. He began his career with the semi-autobiographical series Lowlife and a number of serials in the Dark Horse Presents anthology, before achieving industry-wide acclaim with the Vertigo series Scene of the Crime and moving to the superhero comics such as Batman, Catwoman, The Authority, Captain America, Daredevil and Uncanny X-Men. Brubaker is best known for his long-standing collaboration with British artist Sean Phillips, starting with their Elseworlds one-shot Batman: Gotham Noir in 2001 and continuing with a number of creator-owned series such as Criminal, Incognito, Fatale, The Fade Out, and Kill or Be Killed.

He is also known for co-creating the Winter Soldier identity of Bucky Barnes with Steve Epting.

Brubaker has won numerous awards for his comics work, including seven Eisner Awards, two Harvey Awards, an Ignatz Award, and a GLAAD Media Award. In addition to his work in comics, Brubaker served as the executive producer and co-writer of the 2019 Amazon series Too Old to Die Young, directed by Nicolas Winding Refn.

== Early life ==
Brubaker was the child of a Navy intelligence officer, and spent much of his childhood in Guantánamo Bay, Cuba. From childhood he read comics that included Captain America and his sidekick Bucky Barnes, which were seminal in the storyline he would one day write when creating the Winter Soldier. Describing his affinity for Captain America's sidekick thus, he has stated, "I was a Navy brat, and he was an Army brat." As Bucky had been killed off before Brubaker began reading comics, he assumed that the character had met his demise in an elaborate, dramatic story, only to find that he had been unceremoniously killed in a single page of The Avengers #4, which Brubaker saw as an injustice, commenting, "I was a 9-year-old kid, and I was horrified." His uncle was screenwriter John Paxton.

== Career ==
=== Early work ===
Brubaker began his career in comics as a cartoonist, writing and drawing Pajama Chronicles for Blackthorne Publishing, Purgatory U.S.A. for Slave Labor Graphics and several short stories for various small-press anthologies. His most well-known work of the period is Lowlife, a semi-autobiographical series first published by Caliber and later moved to Aeon Press. For Caliber, Brubaker also co-edited an anthology publication titled Monkey Wrench.

In 1991, Brubaker wrote one of his earliest crime stories for the Dark Horse anthology series Dark Horse Presents, which he would continue to contribute to intermittently throughout the decade. Among those contributions were the three-part serial "An Accidental Death", a collaboration between Brubaker and artist Eric Shanower which garnered the two an Eisner Award nomination in 1993, a Godzilla short story and another tale under the Lowlife title—this time a romantic triangle explored through three stories with each depicting a different participant's point-of-view. The latter story was collected by Alternative Comics into a standalone publication titled At the Seams, which in turn was nominated for Outstanding Graphic Novel or Collection at the 1997 Ignatz Awards. His other work for Alternative Comics, the humorous and experimental Detour #1, was to be the first issue of a series, though only one issue was published. Detour was nominated for the "Best New Series" Harvey Award in 1998.

Brubaker's last work for Dark Horse Presents was "The Fall", a five-part story illustrated by Berlin creator Jason Lutes about a convenience store clerk who gets involved in a ten-year-old murder mystery after he uses a stolen credit card. In 2001, all five parts were collected into a one-shot by Canadian publisher Drawn & Quarterly. In 2004, IDW Publishing announced the first creator-owned project by Brubaker and artist Sean Phillips, a pirate-themed series titled Black Sails. The creators eventually decided to shelve the series in favor of Criminal (published under Marvel's Icon imprint), and "The Fall" remained Brubaker's last independent comics work until his move to Image in 2012.

=== DC Comics ===
In 1995, Brubaker was contacted by DC Comics to write a story about Prez for its "mature readers" imprint Vertigo, after being recommended to the editors by his "An Accidental Death" collaborator Eric Shanower (who was already attached to the project as the artist). The result—Brubaker's first work for one of the two major American comic book publishers—was a one-shot titled Vertigo Visions: Prez, a broad political satire revamping the obscure 1970s Joe Simon creation. Brubaker continued to pitch various ideas to Vertigo but kept getting rejected until Shelly Roeberg asked him to pitch "something [he] didn't think Vertigo would publish", which ended up being Scene of the Crime. The 1999 series marked Brubaker's first collaboration with two artists who would frequently work with him in later years: Michael Lark and Sean Phillips (who joined the project as the inker for issues #2–4). A slacker detective story set in San Francisco, Scene of the Crime was critically acclaimed and brought Brubaker to the attention of Hollywood producers for the first time.

In late 2000, Brubaker signed an exclusive contract with DC Comics. That same year, he wrote his first mainstream superhero work, taking over Batman with issue #582 (Oct. 2000). Brubaker would continue writing various series starring Batman and his ancillary characters until late 2003, including contributions to inter-title crossover storylines such as "Bruce Wayne: Murderer?" and "Bruce Wayne: Fugitive", as well as a stint on Detective Comics that was cut short due to an unspecified dispute with the editors. Also in 2000, Brubaker launched his second creator-owned property at Vertigo, the science fiction series Deadenders with artist Warren Pleece, which lasted 16 issues before its cancellation in 2001. Brubaker's last work for Vertigo was Dead Boy Detectives, a four-issue The Sandman spin-off limited series illustrated by artist Bryan Talbot.

In 2001, Brubaker teamed up with artist Darwyn Cooke to revamp Catwoman, redesigning and redeveloping the character's costume, supporting cast and modus operandi. The pair's stint started with a four-part serial "Trail of the Catwoman", published in Detective Comics #759–762, in which private detective Slam Bradley attempts to investigate the death of Selina Kyle, a.k.a. Catwoman, and continued into the new Catwoman series which launched in late 2001. Brubaker stayed on the series until #37 (Jan. 2005). During this time, Brubaker and Marvel writer Brian Michael Bendis discussed co-writing a team-up tale between DC's Batman and Marvel's Daredevil. The two writers were enthusiastic about their ideas, which included a fight between Batman and Marvel villain Bullseye as well as another fight between Catwoman and Elektra. DC editors Matt Idelson and Bob Schreck were also enthusiastic, but DC Publisher Paul Levitz objected to the project due to a prior disagreement with Marvel's Editor-in-Chief Joe Quesada.

In 2002, Brubaker did his first work for Wildstorm, another DC imprint, penning the five-issue Wildcats spin-off Point Blank. The series, drawn by New Zealand artist Colin Wilson and starring Wildcats' member Grifter, took existing characters and concepts from the Wildstorm Universe and used them to set up Brubaker's Sleeper series which debuted later that year. A collaboration with artist Sean Phillips, Sleeper starred Holden Carver, a secret agent who goes undercover in a supervillain's powerful organization only to have his only contact in law enforcement fall into a coma. With the authorities believing him a dangerous criminal, Carver is caught between the two warring sides with unclear allegiances. Although Sleeper was a success with critics and fans on the Internet, the series underperformed commercially. In December 2003, in a unique publicity stunt conceived to help promote the first trade paperback collection of Sleeper, Brubaker organized an arm wrestling competition at San Francisco's Isotope Comics. If participants were able to beat Brubaker at arm wrestling, they were awarded free signed comic books. According to Brubaker, he wrestled around 40–50 people and won most of the time, losing only to eight or nine contestants.

During the series' run, Sleeper also took part in the line-wide crossover "Coup d'Etat", with Brubaker scripting the first issue of the eponymous limited series. "Coup d'Etat" featured a series of events that led the Authority, a powerful team of superhumans in the Wilstorm Universe, to take over the United States. Following the crossover, Brubaker and artist Dustin Nguyen produced the 12-issue The Authority: Revolution series which explored the ramifications of the team's actions, while Sleeper was relaunched with the Season Two subtitle under the first volume's creative team.

Brubaker's last major project at DC was Gotham Central, co-created by Brubaker, writer Greg Rucka and artist Michael Lark. The series focused on the activities of the Gotham City Police Department, with writers either co-scripting storylines or alternating between the arcs. After Brubaker and Lark left the series due to their newly-signed exclusive contracts with Marvel, Rucka decided to discontinue the title, and Gotham Central was cancelled with issue #40 (Apr. 2006).

=== Marvel Comics ===
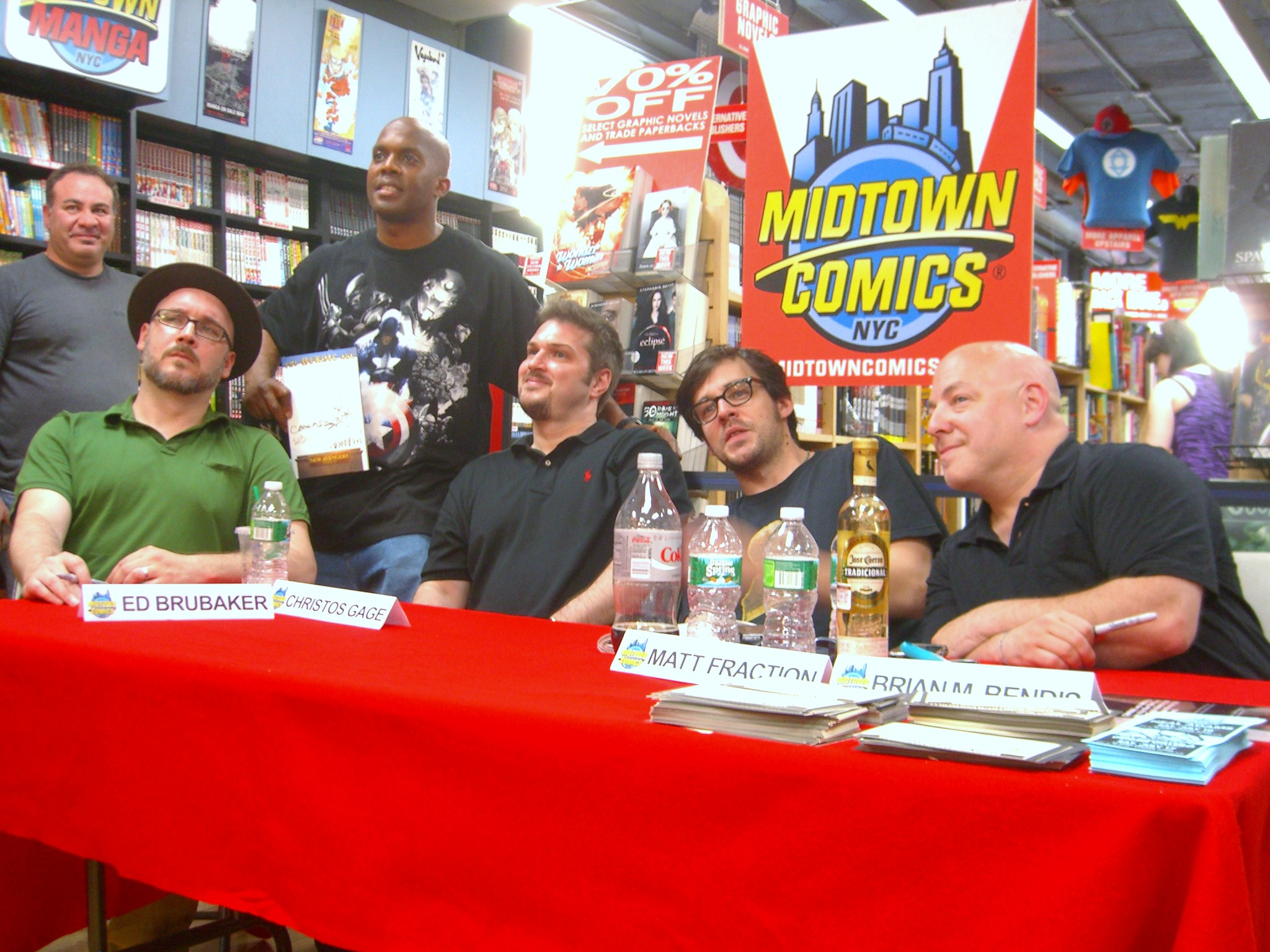
Brubaker (left) at a Midtown Comics book signing in Manhattan with fellow writers (seated left to right) Christos Gage, Matt Fraction and Brian Michael Bendis

Brubaker's first work for Marvel was volume five of the Captain America series. Paired with artist Steve Epting, Brubaker introduced new villains and resurrected the long-dead supporting character Bucky Barnes as "the Winter Soldier". The relaunch was a commercial and critical success from its first issue, with its most well-known storyline involving the assassination of Steve Rogers and subsequent passing of the Captain America mantle to Bucky Barnes. Brubaker wrote Captain America for eight full years, from November 2004 to October 2012, alongside several spin-off titles and associated series based around the character, including the 2009 mini-series Captain America: Reborn, which featured the return of Rogers, the eight-issue The Marvels Project limited series, as well as Secret Avengers, an ongoing series that followed the adventures of the eponymous team formed in the aftermath of the company-wide crossover storyline "Siege".

Brubaker's workload at Marvel increased in 2006. He wrote two limited series, Books of Doom with artist Pablo Raimondi, retelling and expanding on the origin of Doctor Doom, and X-Men: Deadly Genesis with artist Trevor Hairsine, retconning the origins of the All-New, All-Different X-Men team that debuted in 1975. After finishing Deadly Genesis in July 2006, Brubaker became the regular writer of Uncanny X-Men, working with artists Billy Tan and Clayton Henry. In addition to that, he also took over Daredevil, having already planned his run with outgoing writer Brian Michael Bendis. Once again teaming up with his Scene of the Crime and Gotham Central collaborator Michael Lark, Brubaker explored the ramifications of the character's imprisonment which occurred at the close of Bendis' run. Another notable launch of the year was The Immortal Iron Fist, an ongoing series co-written by Brubaker and Matt Fraction which started in November 2006.

Also in 2006, Brubaker and artist Sean Phillips launched their first creator-owned series Criminal, published under Marvel's Icon imprint. The title received generally positive reviews and its first arc, "Coward", won the 2007 Eisner Award for Best New Series. In 2008, after two volumes of Criminal, Brubaker and Phillips took a break from the series to launch another Icon title, Incognito, which Brubaker described as being "about a completely amoral guy with super-powers forced to pretend he's a normal law-abiding citizen, because he's in Witness Protection, and how that shapes what he becomes. It's also a brutal noir twist on the super-hero/super-villain genre that delves more into their roots in the pulps, and it's going to be pretty over-the-top and action-packed."

In February 2010, a controversy arose around Captain America #602, which depicted a group of anti-tax protesters, understood by some readers to be a Tea Party, which was characterized by the Falcon as exclusively white and racist group. Brubaker and Marvel's Editor-in-Chief Joe Quesada apologized for the matter, explaining that, although Brubaker did not intend the protesters to represent any particular real-life group, one of the signs depicted in the scene read, "Tea Bag The Libs Before They Tea Bag YOU!". The slogan was not in Brubaker's script and was instead added by letterer Joe Caramagna, who, under deadline pressures, used messages from signs he found online at the last minute. Quesada further assured that the error would not appear in future reprints of the issue. In an interview following the controversy Brubaker stated, "I had to shut down my public email because I started getting death threats from, y'know, peaceful protesters."

=== Image Comics ===
In January 2012, Brubaker and Phillips launched Fatale at Image Comics. The series was initially announced as a twelve-issue maxi-series but was extended to an ongoing title in November 2012. Jesse Schedeen of IGN stated that "You can't go wrong with a Brubaker/Phillips collaboration. Even so, Fatale is making a strong case for being the best of their projects." In October 2013, Brubaker signed a five-year contract to produce comics exclusively for Image. Under the terms of the deal, Image would publish any comic Brubaker brought to them without having to pitch it. Brubaker stated this arrangement was something he has always wanted. The first series released under this contract was The Fade Out, a Hollywood period piece made with frequent collaborator Sean Phillips.

Brubaker's other projects for Image include Velvet, a spy series illustrated by his Captain America collaborator Steve Epting.

=== Film and television work ===
In March 2009, Brubaker premiered his web series Angel of Death on Crackle. Brubaker made a cameo appearance in the 2014 film Captain America: The Winter Soldier, playing the Winter Soldier's handler. In 2016, Brubaker joined the writing staff for HBO's Westworld. He co-wrote the episode "Dissonance Theory" with Jonathan Nolan.

In 2019, Brubaker partnered with Nicolas Winding Refn to produce Too Old to Die Young, a 10-part neo-noir miniseries for Amazon. In 2022, it was announced that Brubaker would serve as head writer and executive producer on the animated series Batman: Caped Crusader. In 2023, Criminal was announced to be in development at Amazon Prime Video with him serving as writer, executive producer and showrunner. A year later, in 2024, the series was ordered to series with Jordan Harper joining as co-showrunner and Phillips as executive producer. The first part of the series will premiere on January 13, 2027, followed by the second one two weeks later.

== Personal life ==
Brubaker lived previously in Seattle, with his wife, Melanie.

Brubaker currently lives in Los Angeles with his wife and dog.

In August 2026, ljaaz Noohu, the former production assistant of Criminal, filed a lawsuit against Brubaker for sexual, racial, national origin, and religious harassment in the workplace. Two weeks later, representatives of Amazon filed a demurrer against Noohu, accusing him of unprofessional and arrogant behavior while on set, while also defending Brubaker. The defense branded Nuhoo as an "opportunist" who, before his firing from the production of the show, had sent an email to higher-ups demanding to be made an executive producer, despite an allegedly exceptionally poor work ethic, which led to his termination. Members of Criminal's production staff had previously claimed this in the comments of Deadline's original article. The entirety of Amazon's filing is currently linked in the Deadline article and is available for public reading via PDF file.

== Awards and nominations ==
=== Awards ===
- 2003 Prism Award ("Disguises" from Catwoman #17–19)
- 2004 GLAAD Media Awards – Outstanding Comic Book (Catwoman by Ed Brubaker)
- 2006 Harvey Award Winner – Best Writer (Captain America)
- 2007 Eisner Award – Best Writer (Daredevil, Captain America, Criminal), Best New Series (Criminal with Sean Phillips)
- 2007 Harvey Award – Best Writer (Daredevil)
- 2008 Eisner Award – Best Writer (Captain America, Criminal, Daredevil and Immortal Iron Fist)
- 2010 Eisner Award – Best Writer (Captain America, Criminal, Daredevil, The Marvels Project, Incognito), Best Single Issue (Captain America #601 with Gene Colan)
- 2011 Scream Award – Best Comic Book Writer (Captain America, Captain America: Reborn, The Marvels Project, Steve Rogers: Super Soldier)
- 2012 Eisner Award – Best Limited Series or Story Arc (Criminal: The Last of the Innocent with Sean Phillips)
- 2015 Eisner Award – Best New Series (The Fade Out with Sean Phillips)
- 2016 Eisner Award – Best Limited Series (The Fade Out with Sean Phillips)
- 2019 Eisner Award – Best Graphic Album—New (My Heroes Have Always Been Junkies with Sean Phillips)

=== Nominations ===
- 1993 Eisner Award nominee – Best Writer-Artist Team ("An Accidental Death")
- 1997 Ignatz Award nominee – Outstanding Graphic Novel or Collection (At the Seams)
- 1998 Harvey Award nominee – Best New Series (Detour)
- 2000 Eisner Award nominee – Best Writer (Scene of the Crime) and Best Mini-Series (Scene of the Crime)
- 2007 Eisner Award nominee – Best Continuing Series (Daredevil with Michael Lark and Stefano Gaudiano, Captain America with Steve Epting)
- 2010 Eisner Award nominee – Best Limited Series or Story Arc (Incognito with Sean Phillips)
- 2013 Eisner Award nominee – Best Continuing Series (Fatale with Sean Phillips)
- 2013 Eisner Award nominee – Best New Series (Fatale with Sean Phillips)
- 2013 Eisner Award nominee – Best Writer (Fatale)

== Bibliography ==
=== Early work ===
- Blackthorne Publishing:
  - Pajama Chronicles (script and art, one-shot, 1987)
  - Gumby 3-D #4 (as artist — among others; written by Art Clokey, 1987)
- Purgatory U.S.A. (script and art, one-shot, Slave Labor Graphics, 1989)
- Rip Off Press:
  - Rip Off Comix #28: "Love and Fear" (script and art, anthology, 1990)
  - All Shook Up: "Reflecting on an Earthquake" (script and art, anthology one-shot, 1990)
- Caliber:
  - Lowlife #1–2 (script and art, 1991)
    - Three more issues (written and drawn by Brubaker) were published by Aeon Press as Lowlife #3–5 (1993–1996)
    - Stories from all five issues in rearranged order are collected as A Complete Lowlife (tpb, 112 pages, Black Eye, 1997, ISBN 1-891830-20-1)
  - Monkey Wrench: "Almost Like Wisdom" (with Brian Sendelbach, anthology one-shot co-edited by Brubaker and Josh Petrin, Iconografix, 1992)
- Dark Horse Presents (Dark Horse):
  - "Burning Man" (with Mike Christian, in #50, 1991) collected in The Best of Dark Horse Presents Volume 3 (tpb, 120 pages, 1993, ISBN 1-878574-81-7)
  - "An Accidental Death" (with Eric Shanower, in #65–67, 1992) reprinted in the form of a one-shot as An Accidental Death (Fantagraphics Books, 1993)
  - "Here and Now" (with Stefano Gaudiano, in #96–98, 1995)
  - "Bird Dog" (with Patrick McEown, in #100-4, 1995)
  - "Godzilla's Day" (with Dave Cooper, in #106, 1996) collected in Godzilla: Age of Monsters (tpb, 272 pages, 1998, ISBN 1-56971-277-8)
  - "Lowlife" (script and art, in #113–115, 1996) reprinted in the form of a one-shot as At the Seams (Alternative Comics, 1997)
  - "The Fall" (with Jason Lutes, in #131–135, 1998) reprinted in the form of a one-shot as The Fall (Drawn & Quarterly, 2001)
- Real Stuff (as artist, written by Dennis Eichhorn, anthology, Fantagraphics Books):
  - "Sixth Player" (in #9, 1992)
  - "The Guy Who Wanted to Be Friends" (in #13, 1993)
- Madman Adventures (as artist — among others; jam cover for the collected edition, tpb, 66 pages, Tundra, 1993, ISBN 1-56862-014-4)
- Wiindows #21 (cover illustration, Cult Press, 1994)
- Northwest Cartoon Cookery: "Food, Glorious Food" (as artist, written by Dennis Eichhorn, anthology one-shot, Starhead Comix, 1995)
- Oh That Monroe: "The Homo Test" (co-written by Brubaker and Jon Lewis, art by Sam Henderson, anthology one-shot, Wow Cool, 1995)
- Alternative Comics:
  - Detour #1 (of 3 — discontinued after the debut issue) (script and art, 1997)
  - Urban Hipster #1–2 (as "continuity editor"; written and drawn by Greg Stump with David Lasky, 1998)
- Small Press Expo '97: "Mysteries?" (script and art, 1-page story in the anthology one-shot, CBLDF, 1997)
- Oni Double Feature #5 (script and art, untitled 1-page story in the anthology, Oni Press, 1998)
- Astronauts in Trouble: Cool Ed's (as "assistant editor"; written by Larry Young, drawn by Charlie Adlard, one-shot, AiT/Planet Lar, 1999)

=== DC Comics ===
==== Vertigo ====
- Vertigo Visions: Prez (with Eric Shanower, one-shot, 1995) collected in Prez: The First Teen President (tpb, 224 pages, 2016, ISBN 1-4012-6317-8)
- Gangland #3: "Small Time" (with Eric Shanower, anthology, 1998) collected in Gangland (tpb, 112 pages, 2000, ISBN 1-56389-608-7)
- Scene of the Crime (with Michael Lark):
  - Scene of the Crime (tpb, 112 pages, 2000, ISBN 1-56389-670-2; hc, 128 pages, Image, 2012, ISBN 1-60706-632-7) collects:
    - Vertigo: Winter's Edge #2: "God and Sinners" (anthology, 1999)
    - Scene of the Crime #1–4: "A Little Piece of Goodnight" (1999)
  - 9-11 Volume 2: "Still Life" (anthology graphic novel, 224 pages, 2002, ISBN 1-56389-878-0)
- Deadenders (tpb, 392 pages, 2012, ISBN 1-4012-3480-1) collects:
  - Vertigo: Winter's Edge #3: "The Morning After" (with Warren Pleece, anthology, 2000)
  - Deadenders #1–16 (with Warren Pleece, 2000–2001)
- The Sandman Presents: The Dead Boy Detectives #1–4 (with Bryan Talbot, 2001) collected as The Sandman Presents: The Dead Boy Detectives (tpb, 104 pages, 2008, ISBN 1-4012-1855-5)

==== DC Universe ====
- Batman (with Scott McDaniel, James Tucker + Stefano Gaudiano (#600) and Sean Phillips (#603); issues #606–607 are co-written by Brubaker and Geoff Johns, 2000–2002) collected as:
  - Batman by Ed Brubaker Volume 1 (collects #582–586 and 591–597, tpb, 320 pages, 2016, ISBN 1-4012-6065-9)
    - Includes the Batman: Our Worlds at War one-shot (written by Brubaker, art by Stefano Gaudiano, 2001)
  - Batman by Ed Brubaker Volume 2 (collects #598–607, tpb, 288 pages, 2016, ISBN 1-4012-6485-9)
  - Batman: Bruce Wayne — Murderer? (includes #599–602, tpb, 264 pages, 2014, ISBN 1-4012-4683-4)
  - Batman: Bruce Wayne — Fugitive (includes #603–607, tpb, 432 pages, 2014, ISBN 1-4012-4682-6)
- Batman: Turning Points #2 (with Joe Giella) and #3 (with Dick Giordano, 2001) collected in Batman: Turning Points (tpb, 128 pages, 2007, ISBN 1-4012-1360-X)
- Batman: Gotham Adventures #33: "World without Batman" (with Brad Rader, 2001)
- Batman: Gotham Noir (with Sean Phillips, one-shot, Elseworlds, 2001)
- Robin vol. 2 #86 (with Pander Brothers, 2001) collected in Batman: Officer Down (tpb, 168 pages, 2001, ISBN 1-56389-787-3)
- Detective Comics:
  - "History Lesson" (with Steve Lieber, co-feature in #758, 2001)
  - "Dead Reckoning" (with Tommy Castillo, in #777–782, 2003)
  - "Made of Wood" (with Patrick Zircher, in #784–786, 2003) collected in Batman: The Man Who Laughs (hc, 144 pages, 2008, ISBN 1-4012-1622-6; tpb, 2009, ISBN 1-4012-1626-9)
- Catwoman vol. 3 (with Darwyn Cooke (#1–4), Brad Rader, Cameron Stewart, Javier Pulido (#17–19), Guy Davis (#23–24), Paul Gulacy, Sean Phillips (#32) and Diego Olmos (#33), 2002–2005) collected as:
  - Trail of the Catwoman (collects #1–9, tpb, 336 pages, 2012, ISBN 1-4012-3384-8)
    - Includes "Trail of the Catwoman" co-feature serial (art by Darwyn Cooke) from Detective Comics #759–762 (2001)
  - No Easy Way Down (collects #10–24, tpb, 400 pages, 2013, ISBN 1-4012-4037-2)
    - Includes the Catwoman Secret Files & Origins one-shot (written by Brubaker, art by Michael Avon Oeming, Cameron Stewart and Eric Shanower, 2002)
  - Under Pressure (collects #25–37, tpb, 312 pages, 2014, ISBN 1-4012-4592-7)
  - Catwoman of East End Omnibus (includes #1–37, Detective Comics #759–762 and Catwoman Secret Files & Origins, hc, 1,064 pages, 2022, ISBN 1-77951-503-0)
- Gotham Central (with Michael Lark, Brian Hurtt (#11), Greg Scott (#16), Jason Shawn Alexander (#26–27) and Kano (#33–36), 2003–2005) collected as:
  - Issues #1–2, 12–15 and 33–36 are co-written by Brubaker and Greg Rucka.
    - In the Line of Duty (includes #1–5, hc, 240 pages, 2008, ISBN 1-4012-1923-3; tpb, 2011, ISBN 1-4012-2037-1)
    - Jokers and Madmen (includes #11–16 and 19–22, hc, 288 pages, 2009, ISBN 1-4012-2521-7; tpb, 2011, ISBN 1-4012-2543-8)
    - On the Freak Beat (includes #26–27, hc, 224 pages, 2010, ISBN 1-4012-2754-6; tpb, 2011, ISBN 1-4012-3232-9)
    - Corrigan (includes #33–36, hc, 224 pages, 2011, ISBN 1-4012-3003-2; tpb, 2012, ISBN 1-4012-3194-2)
    - Omnibus (includes #1–5, 11–16, 19–22, 26–27, 33–36, hc, 957 pages, 2016, ISBN 1-4012-6192-2)
- Batman: Gotham Knights #41: "I'll Be Watching" (with Ryan Sook, co-feature, 2003) collected in Batman: Black and White Volume 3 (hc, 288 pages, 2007, ISBN 1-4012-1531-9; tpb, 2008, ISBN 1-4012-1354-5)
- Hawkman vol. 4 #27: "The Black Bird" (with Sean Phillips, 2004)
- Batman: The Man Who Laughs (with Doug Mahnke, one-shot, 2005)
- Catwoman: 80th Anniversary 100-Page Super Spectacular: "The Art of Picking a Lock" (with Cameron Stewart, anthology one-shot, 2020) collected in Batman: 80 Years of the Bat Family (tpb, 400 pages, 2020, ISBN 1-77950-658-9)

==== Wildstorm ====
- The Sleeper Omnibus (hc, 720 pages, Vertigo, 2013, ISBN 1-4012-3803-3) collects:
  - Point Blank #1–5 (with Colin Wilson, Eye of the Storm, 2002–2003) also collected as Point Blank (tpb, 128 pages, 2003, ISBN 1-4012-0116-4)
  - Sleeper #1–12 (with Sean Phillips, Eye of the Storm, 2003–2004) also collected as Sleeper: Season One (tpb, 288 pages, 2009, ISBN 1-4012-2360-5)
  - Coup d'Etat:
    - Coup d'Etat #1 (of 4) (with Jim Lee, Eye of the Storm, 2004) also collected in Coup d'Etat (tpb, 112 pages, 2004, ISBN 1-4012-0570-4)
    - Coup d'Etat: Afterword: "Sleeper Prelude" (with Sean Phillips, co-feature in one-shot, 2004) also collected in Sleeper: Season Two (tpb, 296 pages, 2009, ISBN 1-4012-2493-8)
  - Sleeper: Season Two #1–12 (with Sean Phillips, 2004–2005) also collected as Sleeper: Season Two (tpb, 296 pages, 2009, ISBN 1-4012-2493-8)
- Masks: Too Hot for TV!: "Introduction" (with Doug Mahnke, anthology one-shot, Eye of the Storm, 2004)
- Tom Strong #29–30 (with Duncan Fegredo, America's Best Comics, 2004–2005) collected in Tom Strong Book Five (hc, 136 pages, 2005, ISBN 1-4012-0624-7; tpb, 2006, ISBN 1-4012-0625-5)
- The Authority: Revolution #1–12 (with Dustin Nguyen, 2004–2005) collected as The Authority by Ed Brubaker and Dustin Nguyen (tpb, 328 pages, 2019, ISBN 1-4012-8842-1)
- The Razor's Edge: RedBird (with Jason Pearson, unreleased 5-issue limited series — initially announced for 2005)
  - Three issues were solicited before the series was pulled off schedule.

=== Marvel Comics ===
- Captain America:
  - Captain America vol. 5 (with Steve Epting, Michael Lark, John Paul Leon (#7), Lee Weeks (#10), Mike Perkins, Butch Guice, Roberto de la Torre (#39), Luke Ross, Mitch Breitweiser (#600, 607, 615.1, 619), David Aja + Rafael Albuquerque + Howard Chaykin (#600), Gene Colan (#601), Daniel Acuña (#611), Travis Charest + Ed McGuinness (#616), Mike Deodato, Jr. (#616–617), Chris Samnee (#617–624) and Francesco Francavilla (#625–628); after issue #619, the series was rebranded as Captain America and Bucky with issues #620–624 co-written by Brubaker and Marc Andreyko and #625–628 co-written by Brubaker and James Asmus, 2005–2012) collected as:
    - Ultimate Collection: Captain America — The Winter Soldier (collects #1–9 and 11–14, tpb, 304 pages, 2010, ISBN 0-7851-4341-6; hc, 2014, ISBN 0-7851-8794-4)
    - House of M: Wolverine, Iron Man and Hulk (includes #10, hc, 352 pages, 2010, ISBN 0-7851-3882-X)
    - Ultimate Collection: Captain America — Red Menace (collects #15–21, tpb, 216 pages, 2011, ISBN 0-7851-5617-8)
      - Includes Captain America 65th Anniversary Special (written by Brubaker, art by Mike Perkins, Javier Pulido and Marcos Martín, 2006)
    - The Death of Captain America: The Complete Collection (collects #22–42, tpb, 568 pages, 2013, ISBN 0-7851-8379-5)
      - Includes the Winter Soldier: Winter Kills one-shot (written by Brubaker, art by Lee Weeks and Stefano Gaudiano, 2007)
    - Captain America: The Man with No Face (collects #43–48, hc, 168 pages, 2009, ISBN 0-7851-3153-1; tpb, 2009, ISBN 0-7851-3163-9)
    - Captain America: Road to Reborn (collects #49–50 and 600–601, hc, 176 pages, 2009, ISBN 0-7851-4174-X; tpb, 2010, ISBN 0-7851-4175-8)
    - Captain America: Reborn (hc, 232 pages, 2010, ISBN 0-7851-3998-2; tpb, 2010, ISBN 0-7851-4073-5) collects:
      - Captain America: Reborn Prelude (with Luke Ross, free digital mini-comic, 2009)
      - Captain America: Reborn #1–6 (with Bryan Hitch, 2009–2010)
    - Captain America: Two Americas (collects #602–605, hc, 128 pages, 2010, ISBN 0-7851-4510-9; tpb, 2010, ISBN 0-7851-4511-7)
      - Includes the Captain America: Reborn — Who Will Wield the Shield? one-shot (written by Brubaker, art by Butch Guice and Luke Ross, 2010)
    - Captain America: No Escape (collects #606–610, hc, 120 pages, 2010, ISBN 0-7851-4512-5; tpb, 2011, ISBN 0-7851-4513-3)
    - Captain America: The Trial of Captain America (collects #611–615 and 615.1, hc, 144 pages, 2011, ISBN 0-7851-5119-2; tpb, 2011, ISBN 0-7851-5120-6)
    - Captain America: Prisoner of War (collects #616–619, hc, 144 pages, 2011, ISBN 0-7851-5119-2; tpb, 2011, ISBN 0-7851-5120-6)
    - Captain America and Bucky: The Life Story of Bucky Barnes (collects #620–624, hc, 112 pages, 2012, ISBN 0-7851-5123-0; tpb, 2012, ISBN 0-7851-5124-9)
    - Captain America and Bucky: Old Wounds (collects #625–628, hc, 128 pages, 2012, ISBN 0-7851-6083-3; tpb, 2012, ISBN 0-7851-6084-1)
    - Captain America by Ed Brubaker Omnibus (collects #1–25, Captain America 65th Anniversary Special and Winter Soldier: Winter Kills, hc, 744 pages, 2007, ISBN 0-7851-2866-2)
    - The Death of Captain America Omnibus (collects #26–42, hc, 464 pages, 2009, ISBN 0-7851-3806-4)
    - Captain America Lives! Omnibus (collects #43–50, 600–601, Captain America: Reborn Prelude and #1–6, hc, 560 pages, 2011, ISBN 0-7851-4514-1)
    - The Trial of Captain America Omnibus (includes #602–619, 615.1, Captain America: Reborn — Who Will Wield the Shield? and Steve Rogers: Super-Soldier #1–4, hc, 928 pages, 2014, ISBN 0-7851-9272-7)
    - Return of the Winter Soldier Omnibus (includes #620–628, Fear Itself: Book of the Skull, Fear Itself #7.1 and Winter Soldier #1–14, hc, 752 pages, 2015, ISBN 0-7851-9271-9)
  - Steve Rogers: Super-Soldier #1–4 (with Dale Eaglesham, 2010) collected as Steve Rogers: Super-Soldier (hc, 112 pages, 2011, ISBN 0-7851-4878-7; tpb, 2011, ISBN 0-7851-4879-5)
  - Fear Itself: Book of the Skull (with Scot Eaton, one-shot, 2011) collected in Fear Itself (hc, 240 pages, 2012, ISBN 0-7851-5662-3; tpb, 2012, ISBN 0-7851-5663-1)
  - Captain America vol. 6 (with Steve McNiven (#1–5), Alan Davis (#6–10), Patrick Zircher (#11–14), Scot Eaton (#15–18) and Steve Epting (#19); issues #15–18 are co-written by Brubaker and Cullen Bunn, 2011–2012) collected as:
    - Captain America by Ed Brubaker Volume 1 (collects #1–5, hc, 120 pages, 2012, ISBN 0-7851-5708-5; tpb, 2012, ISBN 0-7851-5709-3)
    - Captain America by Ed Brubaker Volume 2 (collects #6–10, hc, 112 pages, 2012, ISBN 0-7851-5710-7; tpb, 2012, ISBN 0-7851-5711-5)
    - Captain America by Ed Brubaker Volume 3 (collects #11–14, hc, 112 pages, 2012, ISBN 0-7851-6075-2; tpb, 2013, ISBN 0-7851-6076-0)
    - Captain America by Ed Brubaker Volume 4 (collects #15–19, hc, 120 pages, 2013, ISBN 0-7851-6077-9; tpb, 2013, ISBN 0-7851-6078-7)
    - The Trial of Captain America Omnibus (includes #1–10, hc, 928 pages, 2014, ISBN 0-7851-9272-7)
    - Return of the Winter Soldier Omnibus (includes #11–19, hc, 752 pages, 2015, ISBN 0-7851-9271-9)
  - Winter Soldier by Ed Brubaker: The Complete Collection (tpb, 344 pages, 2014, ISBN 0-7851-9065-1) collects:
    - Fear Itself #7.1 (with Butch Guice, 2012)
    - Winter Soldier #1–14 (with Butch Guice and Michael Lark (#6–9), 2012–2013)
- What If... Aunt May Had Died Instead of Uncle Ben? (with Andrea Di Vito, one-shot, 2005) collected in What If... Why Not? (tpb, 152 pages, 2005, ISBN 0-7851-1593-5)
- Wha... Huh? (with Jim Mahfood, among other writers, one-shot, 2005) collected in Secret Wars Too (tpb, 208 pages, 2016, ISBN 1-302-90211-3)
- Books of Doom #1–6 (with Pablo Raimondi, 2006) collected as Fantastic Four: Books of Doom (hc, 144 pages, 2006, ISBN 0-7851-2271-0; tpb, 2007, ISBN 0-7851-1704-0)
- X-Men:
  - X-Men: Deadly Genesis #1–6 (with Trevor Hairsine and Pete Woods, 2006) collected as X-Men: Deadly Genesis (hc, 200 pages, 2006, ISBN 0-7851-1961-2; tpb, 2007, ISBN 0-7851-1830-6)
  - Uncanny X-Men (with Billy Tan, Clayton Henry (#477, 480, 483), Salvador Larocca (#487–491), Mike Choi (#495–499), Terry Dodson (#500) and Greg Land (#500–503), 2006–2008) collected as:
    - The Rise and Fall of the Shi'ar Empire (collects #475–486, hc, 312 pages, 2007, ISBN 0-7851-2515-9; tpb, 2008, ISBN 0-7851-1800-4)
    - The Extremists (collects #487–491, tpb, 120 pages, 2008, ISBN 0-7851-1982-5)
    - X-Men: Messiah Complex (includes #492–494, hc, 352 pages, 2008, ISBN 0-7851-2899-9; tpb, 2008, ISBN 0-7851-2320-2)
      - Includes the X-Men: Messiah Complex one-shot (written by Brubaker, art by Marc Silvestri, 2007)
    - Divided We Stand (collects #495–499, tpb, 120 pages, 2008, ISBN 0-7851-1983-3)
    - Manifest Destiny (includes #500–503, hc, 208 pages, 2009, ISBN 0-7851-3817-X; tpb, 2009, ISBN 0-7851-2451-9)
      - Issues #500–503 are co-written by Brubaker and Matt Fraction.
- Daredevil vol. 2 (with Michael Lark, David Aja (#88 and 116), Lee Weeks (#94), Leandro Fernández (Annual), Stefano Gaudiano, Paul Azaceta (#103–106), Clay Mann (#111) and Tonči Zonjić (#115), 2006–2009) collected as:
  - Annual #1 is co-written by Brubaker and Ande Parks; issues #107–110 are co-written by Brubaker and Greg Rucka.
    - Daredevil by Ed Brubaker and Michael Lark Omnibus Volume 1 (collects #82–105, hc, 608 pages, 2009, ISBN 0-7851-3785-8)
    - Daredevil by Ed Brubaker and Michael Lark Omnibus Volume 2 (collects #106–119, 500 and Annual #1, hc, 472 pages, 2010, ISBN 0-7851-4520-6)
      - Includes the Daredevil: Blood of the Tarantula one-shot (co-written by Brubaker and Ande Parks, art by Chris Samnee, 2008)
    - Ultimate Collection: Daredevil by Ed Brubaker and Michael Lark Volume 1 (collects #82–93, tpb, 304 pages, 2012, ISBN 0-7851-6334-4)
    - Ultimate Collection: Daredevil by Ed Brubaker and Michael Lark Volume 2 (collects #94–105, tpb, 304 pages, 2012, ISBN 0-7851-6335-2)
    - Ultimate Collection: Daredevil by Ed Brubaker and Michael Lark Volume 3 (collects #106–119 and 500, tpb, 384 pages, 2012, ISBN 0-7851-6336-0)
- Criminal (with Sean Phillips, Icon):
  - Volume 1 (hc, 432 pages, 2009, ISBN 0-7851-4229-0) collects:
    - Criminal Preview (free 5-page "trailer", 2006)
    - Criminal (2006–2007) also collected as:
      - Coward (collects #1–5, tpb, 128 pages, 2007, ISBN 0-7851-2439-X)
      - Lawless (collects #6–10, tpb, 128 pages, 2007, ISBN 0-7851-2816-6)
    - Criminal vol. 2 #1–3 (2008) also collected as Criminal: The Dead and the Dying (tpb, 104 pages, 2008, ISBN 0-7851-3227-9)
    - Liberty Comics #1: "No One Rides for Free" (anthology, Image, 2008) also collected in CBLDF Presents: Liberty (hc, 216 pages, 2014, ISBN 1-60706-937-7; tpb, 2016, ISBN 1-60706-996-2)
  - Volume 2 (hc, 432 pages, 2012, ISBN 0-7851-6584-3) collects:
    - Criminal vol. 2 #4–7 (2008) also collected as Criminal: Bad Night (tpb, 120 pages, 2009, ISBN 0-7851-3228-7)
    - Noir: A Collection of Crime Comics: "21st Century Noir" (anthology graphic novel, sc, 104 pages, Dark Horse, 2009, ISBN 1-59582-358-1; hc, 2020, ISBN 1-5067-1686-5)
    - Criminal: The Sinners #1–5 (2009–2010) also collected as Criminal: The Sinners (tpb, 144 pages, 2010, ISBN 0-7851-3229-5)
    - Criminal: The Last of the Innocent #1–4 (2011) also collected as Criminal: The Last of the Innocent (tpb, 112 pages, 2011, ISBN 0-7851-5829-4)
- The Immortal Iron Fist (co-written by Brubaker and Matt Fraction):
  - The Last Iron Fist Story (hc, 160 pages, 2007, ISBN 0-7851-2854-9; tpb, 2007, ISBN 0-7851-2489-6) collects:
    - Civil War: Choosing Sides: "The Immortal Iron Fist" (with David Aja, anthology one-shot, 2006)
    - "The Last Iron Fist Story" (with David Aja, Travel Foreman, John Severin, Russ Heath and Sal Buscema, in #1–6, 2007)
  - The Seven Capital Cities of Heaven (hc, 216 pages, 2008, ISBN 0-7851-2992-8; tpb, 2008, ISBN 0-7851-2535-3) collects:
    - "Men of a Certain Deadly Persuasion" (with Howard Chaykin, Dan Brereton and Jelena Kevic-Djurdjević, in Annual, 2007)
    - "The Seven Capital Cities of Heaven" (with David Aja, Roy Martinez, Scott Koblish, Kano, Javier Pulido, Tonči Zonjić and Clay Mann, in #8–14, 2007–2008)
  - The Book of Iron Fist (hc, 160 pages, 2008, ISBN 0-7851-2993-6; tpb, 2009, ISBN 0-7851-2536-1) collects:
    - "The Pirate Queen of Pinghai Bay" (with Travel Foreman, Leandro Fernández and Khari Evans, in #7, 2007)
    - Orson Randall and the Green Mist of Death (with Russ Heath, Mitch Breitweiser, Nick Dragotta and Lewis LaRosa, one-shot, 2008)
    - The Origin of Danny Rand (with Kano, two-page framing sequence for a reprint of Marvel Premiere #15–16, one-shot, 2008)
    - "The Story of the Iron Fist Bei Bang-Wen (1827–1860)" (with Khari Evans, in #15, 2008)
    - "Happy Birthday Danny" (with David Aja, in #16, 2008)
  - Omnibus (collects #1–16, Annual, Civil War: Choosing Sides, Orson Randall and the Green Mist of Death and The Origin of Danny Rand, hc, 560 pages, 2009, ISBN 0-7851-3819-6)
  - The Complete Collection Volume 1 (collects #1–16, Annual, Civil War: Choosing Sides, Orson Randall and the Green Mist of Death and The Origin of Danny Rand, tpb, 496 pages, 2013, ISBN 0-7851-8542-9)
- What If...? Civil War: "The Stranger" (with Marko Djurdjević, framing sequence in the one-shot, 2008) collected in What If: Civil War (tpb, 168 pages, 2008, ISBN 0-7851-3036-5)
- Young Avengers Presents #1: "Patriot" (with Paco Medina, 2008) collected in Young Avengers Presents (tpb, 144 pages, 2008, ISBN 0-7851-2975-8)
- Incognito: The Classified Edition (hc, 368 pages, 2012, ISBN 0-7851-6574-6) collects:
  - Incognito #1–6 (with Sean Phillips, Icon, 2008–2009) also collected as Incognito (tpb, 176 pages, 2009, ISBN 0-7851-3979-6)
  - Incognito: Bad Influences #1–5 (with Sean Phillips, Icon, 2010–2011) also collected as Incognito: Bad Influences (tpb, 144 pages, 2011, ISBN 0-7851-5155-9)
- The Marvels Project #1–8 (with Steve Epting, 2009–2010) collected as The Marvels Project: Birth of the Super Heroes (hc, 208 pages, 2010, ISBN 0-7851-4630-X; tpb, 2011, ISBN 0-7851-4061-1)
- Secret Avengers (with Mike Deodato, Jr., David Aja + Michael Lark (#5) and Will Conrad (#9–12), 2010–2011) collected as:
  - Mission to Mars (collects #1–5, hc, 136 pages, 2011, ISBN 0-7851-4599-0; tpb, 2011, ISBN 0-7851-4600-8)
  - Eyes of the Dragon (collects #6–12, hc, 168 pages, 2011, ISBN 0-7851-4601-6; tpb, 2012, ISBN 0-7851-4602-4)
  - Secret Avengers by Ed Brubaker: The Complete Collection (collects #1–12, tpb, 304 pages, 2018, ISBN 1-302-91219-4)
- Avengers vs. X-Men:
  - Marvel Point One: "Behold the Watcher" (with Javier Pulido, anthology one-shot, 2012) collected in Original Sin (hc, 392 pages, 2014, ISBN 0-7851-9069-4; tpb, 240 pages, 2015, ISBN 0-7851-5491-4)
  - Avengers vs. X-Men #3 (with John Romita, Jr.) and #10 (with Adam Kubert, 2012) collected in Avengers vs. X-Men (hc, 568 pages, 2012, ISBN 0-7851-6317-4; tpb, 384 pages, 2013, ISBN 0-7851-6318-2)

=== Image Comics ===
==== Criminal (2006-present) ====
After collaborating on Sleeper for DC Comics, Brubaker and Sean Phillips took their partnership to Marvel to create Criminal. In 2016, the duo moved the series to Image Comics, producing a series of one-shots and original graphic novels, before launching a new ongoing series in 2019.

===== Trade paperbacks & Premier hardcovers =====
#	Title	Years covered	Issues collected	Pages	Publisher	Released	ISBN
1	Coward	2006-2007	Criminal (2006) #1-5	128	Icon	23 May 2007	978-0785124399
1	Coward	2006-2007	Criminal (2006) #1-5	128	Image	10 Feb 2015	978-1632151704
1	Coward	2006-2007	Criminal (2006) #1-5	144	Image	4 Feb 2025	978-1534370906
2	Lawless	2007	Criminal (2006) #6-10	128	Icon	20 Dec 2007	978-0785128168
2	Lawless	2007	Criminal (2006) #6-10	128	Image	3 Mar 2015	978-1632152039
2	Lawless	2007	Criminal (2006) #6-10	144	Image	4 Feb 2025	978-1534385078
3	The Dead And The Dying	2008	Criminal 2 (2008) #1-3	104	Icon	23 Jul 2008	978-0785132271
3	The Dead And The Dying	2008	Criminal 2 (2008) #1-3	128	Image	7 Apr 2015	978-1632152336
3	The Dead And The Dying	2008	Criminal 2 (2008) #1-3	128	Image	4 Mar 2025	978-1534341869
4	Bad Night	2008	Criminal 2 (2008) #4-7	120	Icon	1 Jan 2009	978-0785132288
4	Bad Night	2008	Criminal 2 (2008) #4-7	120	Image	5 May 2015	978-1632152602
4	Bad Night	2008	Criminal 2 (2008) #4-7	120	Image	1 Apr 2025	978-1534374003
5	The Sinners	2009-2010	Criminal: The Sinners #1-5	120	Icon	30 Jun 2010	978-0785132295
5	The Sinners	2009-2010	Criminal: The Sinners #1-5	120	Image	16 Jun 2015	978-1632152985
5	The Sinners	2009-2010	Criminal: The Sinners #1-5	144	Image	6 May 2025	978-1534347281
6	The Last Of The Innocent	2011	Criminal: The Last Of The Innocent #1-4	120	Icon	12 Jan 2012	978-0785158295
6	The Last Of The Innocent	2011	Criminal: The Last Of The Innocent #1-4	120	Image	14 Jul 2015	978-1632152992
6	The Last Of The Innocent	2011	Criminal: The Last Of The Innocent #1-4	144	Image	3 Jun 2025	978-1534357617
7	Wrong Time, Wrong Place	2016	Savage Sword Of Criminal; Deadly Hands Of Criminal	112	Image	13 Sep 2016	978-1632158772
7	Wrong Time, Wrong Place	2016	Savage Sword Of Criminal; Deadly Hands Of Criminal	120	Image	1 Jul 2025	978-1534353619
8	My Heroes Have Always Been Junkies	2018	OGN	72	Image	16 Oct 2018	HC: 978-1534308466
8	My Heroes Have Always Been Junkies	2018	OGN	72	Image	10 Dec 2019	TPB: 978-1534315150
8	My Heroes Have Always Been Junkies	2018	OGN	80	Image	5 Aug 2025	TPB: 978-1534350670
9	Bad Weekend	2019	Criminal (2019) #2-3	72	Image	16 Jul 2019	HC: 978-1534314405
9	Bad Weekend	2019	Criminal (2019) #2-3	80	Image	2 Sep 2025	TPB: 978-1534375178
10	Cruel Summer	2019-2020	Criminal (2019) #1, 5-12	272	Image	1 Feb 2022	978-1534321892
10	Cruel Summer	2019-2020	Criminal (2019) #1, 5-12	272	Image	7 Oct 2025	978-1534366671
11	The Knives	2025	OGN	200	Image	9 Sep 2025	HC: 978-1534355590
12	Five Gears in Reverse	2026	OGN	144	Image	27 May 2026	HC: 978-1534333208

===== Deluxe hardcovers =====
#	Title	Years covered	Issues collected	Pages	Publisher	Released	ISBN
1	Criminal: The Deluxe Edition Vol.1	2006-2008	Criminal (2006) #1-10; Criminal 2 (2008) #1-3	432	Icon	4 Nov 2009	978-0785142294
1	Criminal: The Deluxe Edition Vol.1	2006-2008	Criminal (2006) #1-10; Criminal 2 (2008) #1-3	432	Image	12 Sep 2017	978-1534305410
2	Criminal: The Deluxe Edition Vol. 2	2008-2011	Criminal (2008) #4-7; Criminal: The Sinners #1-5; Criminal: The Last Of The Innocent #1-4	432	Icon	3 Oct 2012	978-0785165842
2	Criminal: The Deluxe Edition Vol. 2	2008-2011	Criminal (2008) #4-7; Criminal: The Sinners #1-5; Criminal: The Last Of The Innocent #1-4	432	Image	12 Sep 2017	978-1534305434
3	Criminal: The Deluxe Edition Vol. 3	2016-2019	Savage Sword Of Criminal; Deadly Hands Of Criminal; My Heroes Have Always Been Junkies OGN; Bad Weekend OGN; Criminal (2019) #1, 4	400	Image	1 Dec 2020	978-1534317062
4	Cruel Summer	2019-2020	Criminal (2019) #1, 5-12	288	Image	18 Aug 2020	978-1534316430

==== Incognito (2008-2011) ====
Following the success of Criminal with Marvel's Icon imprint, Incognito was the second series launch for Brubaker and Phillips. It tells the story of Zack Overkill, who was placed in witness protection after informing on his supervillain boss. The series was reprinted by Image Comics in 2017.

Title	Issues collected	Pages	Format	Publisher	Released	ISBN
Incognito	Incognito #1-6	176	TPB	Icon	December 9, 2009	978-0785139799
Incognito: Bad Influences	Incognito: Bad Influences #1-5	144	TPB	Icon	July 11, 2011	978-0785151555
Incognito: The Classified Edition	Incognito #1-6; Incognito: Bad Influences #1-5	336	OHC	Icon	September 5, 2012	978-0785165743
Incognito: The Classified Edition	Incognito #1-6; Incognito: Bad Influences #1-5	368	OHC	Image	September 12, 2017	978-1534305427

==== Fatale (2012-2014) ====
With art from Phillips, and colors from Dave Stewart, Fatale is a part-pulp, part-horror story of a femme fatale, set between the 1950s and 1970s.

Brubaker said the story came from trying to push himself creatively. "It seemed like a bigger challenge to try to do three noir tales that are wound around a horror story examination of the idea of the femme fatale archetype."

Title	Issues collected	Pages	Format	Publisher	Released	ISBN
Fatale Vol. 1: Death Chases Me	Fatale #1-5	144	TPB	Image	July 10, 2012	978-1607065630
Fatale Vol. 2: The Devil's Business	Fatale #6-10	136	TPB	Image	January 15, 2013	978-1607066187
Fatale Vol. 3: West of Hell	Fatale #11-14	128	TPB	Image	July 9, 2013	978-1607067436
Fatale Vol. 4: Pray For Rain	Fatale #15-19	144	TPB	Image	February 25, 2014	978-1607068358
Fatale Vol. 5: Curse The Demon	Fatale #20-24	144	TPB	Image	October 7, 2014	978-1632150073
Fatale: Compendium	Fatale #1-24	656	TPB	Image	July 30, 2024	978-1534327658
Fatale: Compendium (Indigo Canada version)	Fatale #1-24	656	TPB	Image	July 30, 2024	978-1534337916
Fatale: The Deluxe Edition Vol.1	Fatale #1-10	288	HC	Image	March 18, 2014	978-1607069423
Fatale: The Deluxe Edition Vol.2	Fatale #11-24	440	HC	Image	November 24, 2015	978-1632155030

==== Velvet (2013-2016) ====
Co-created with Captain America artist, Steve Epting, Brubaker said Velvet was "A Cold War-era story about a spy that nobody sees coming, even—or especially—all the spies around her".

The story came to comics after being rejected as a television pitch. Brubaker said: "The notes that we got from everybody were that she needed to be 25, and an agent-in-training learning from the cool male secret agent. I was just like 'OK, this is... just appalling to me.' Rather than a character that had lived a real life, they wanted a woman 20 years younger, stripped of Velvet's expertise and maturity."

Title	Issues collected	Pages	Format	Publisher	Released	ISBN
Velvet Vol. 1	Velvet #1-5	128	TPB	Image	July 1, 2014	978-1607069645
Velvet Vol. 2: The Secret Lives Of Dead Men	Velvet #6-10	128	TPB	Image	June 2, 2015	978-1632152343
Velvet Vol. 3: The Man Who Stole The World	Velvet #11-15	136	TPB	Image	September 27, 2016	978-1632157270
Velvet Deluxe Edition	Velvet #1-15	414	OHC	Image	April 4, 2017	978-1632159151

==== The Fade Out (2014-2016) ====
Set in Hollywood 1948, Brubaker and Phillips' The Fade Out tells the story of a screenwriter who awakens in a room with a dead actor. Brubaker said: "It's all based on things that have happened. Not the murder itself and the coverup, but the details. The way that the FBI had informants and people fronting, pretending they were working for the studios."

Title	Issues collected	Pages	Format	Publisher	Released	ISBN
The Fade Out: Act One	The Fade Out #1-4	120	TPB	Image	February 25, 2015	978-1632151711
The Fade Out: Act Two	The Fade Out #5-8	112	TPB	Image	September 29, 2015	978-1632154477
The Fade Out: Act Three	The Fade Out #9-12	128	TPB	Image	February 23, 2016	978-1632156297
The Fade Out: The Complete Collection	The Fade Out #1-12	360	TPB	Image	November 20, 2018	978-1534308602
The Fade Out: The Deluxe Edition	The Fade Out #1-12	384	OHC	Image	October 18, 2016	978-1632159113

==== Kill Or Be Killed (2017-2018) ====
Brubaker and Phillips collaborated to tell a 20-issue story in which a relatively normal art student turns into a gun-toting antihero. Kill Or Be Killed was described as Death Wish meets Breaking Bad.

Title	Issues collected	Pages	Format	Publisher	Released	ISBN
Kill Or Be Killed Vol. 1	Kill Or Be Killed #1-4	128	TPB	Image	January 24, 2017	978-1534300286
Kill Or Be Killed Vol. 2	Kill Or Be Killed #5-10	176	TPB	Image	August 15, 2017	978-1534302280
Kill Or Be Killed Vol. 3	Kill Or Be Killed #11-14	120	TPB	Image	January 23, 2018	978-1534304710
Kill Or Be Killed Vol. 4	Kill Or Be Killed #15-20	144	TPB	Image	August 21, 2018	978-1534306516
Kill Or Be Killed Compendium	Kill Or Be Killed #1-20	600	TPB	Image	February 25, 2025	978-1534333949
Kill Or Be Killed: The Deluxe Edition	Kill Or Be Killed #1-20	624	OHC	Image	November 26, 2019	978-1534313606

==== Reckless (2020-2022) ====
Co-created with Phillips, Reckless is set in Los Angeles during the early 1980s. It tells the story of former FBI agent, Ethan Reckless, and projectionist Anna, with their crusade for payback on villains.

Brubaker's inspiration was to wonder what a pulp hero would look like without "all the blatant racism and sexism" that was prevalent in the 1950s and 1960s version of the genre. The idea came out of the Covid-19 pandemic. "(Sean and I) were both looking for some kind of escape. Something that we could throw ourselves into."

Title	Pages	Format	Publisher	Released	ISBN
Reckless	144	HC	Image	December 22, 2020	978-1534318519
Reckless: Friend Of The Devil	144	HC	Image	April 27, 2021	978-1534318366
Reckless: Destroy All Monsters	144	HC	Image	October 26, 2021	978-1534319240
Reckless: Ghost In You	144	HC	Image	April 19, 2022	978-1534322080
Reckless: Follow Me Down	144	HC	Image	October 18, 2022	978-1534323421

==== Friday (2021-2024) ====
Originally published on Panel Syndicate as an e-comic, Friday was co-created with Marcos Martin and Muntsa Vicente. The series was re-released as a trio of paperbacks by Image Comics.

Title	Issues collected	Pages	Format	Publisher	Released	ISBN
Friday Book One: The First Day Of Christmas	Friday #1-3	120	TPB	Image	November 9, 2021	978-1534320581
Friday Book Two: On A Cold Winter's Night	Friday #4-6	120	TPB	Image	December 20, 2022	978-1534324596
Friday Book Three: Christmas Time is Here Again	Friday #7-9	128	TPB	Image	August 6, 2024	978-1534327733
Friday: Deluxe Edition	Friday #1-9	368	OHC	Image	November 25, 2025	978-1534331600

==== Standalone material ====
Title	Co-creator	Pages	Format	Publisher	Released	ISBN
Pulp	Sean Phillips	72	HC	Image	29 Jul 2020	978-1534316447
Pulp	Sean Phillips	80	TPB	Image	Jan 26, 2021	978-1534318854
Pulp	Sean Phillips	256	OHC	Image	17 Aug 2022	978-1534323025
Night Fever	Sean Phillips	120	HC	Image	18 Oct 2023	978-1534326095
Night Fever (Indigo foil cover version)	Sean Phillips	120	HC	Image	18 Oct 2023	978-1534399150
Where The Body Was	Sean Phillips	144	HC	Image	16 Jan 2024	978-1534398269
Houses Of The Unholy	Sean Phillips	144	HC	Image	3 Sep 2024	978-1534327429
Unfinished Tales	Sean Phillips	144	HC	Image	11 Nov 2026	978-1534330122

=== Other publishers ===
- IDW Publishing:
  - Black Sails (with Sean Phillips, unreleased 3-issue limited series — initially announced in 2004 but abandoned in favor of Brubaker and Phillips' Criminal)
  - Richard Stark's Parker: The Martini Edition — Last Call: "Tomorrow and Tomorrow and Tomorrow" (with Sean Phillips, story created for the collection; hc, 360 pages, 2022, ISBN 1-68405-698-5)
    - In addition to this short story, Brubaker provided commentary for the section of Darwyn Cooke's preliminary and promotional art for the Parker series and the section commemorating Cooke.
- The Spirit Centenary Newspaper (with Sean Phillips, untitled 1-page story in the tabloid-sized anthology, LICAF, 2017)
- Friday (with Marcos Martín, drawings, and Muntsa Vicente, colors; digital, Panel Syndicate, 2020–2024). Publisher on-line in English and Spanish, published in print in English, Spanish, and Catalan. Collected in print via Image as:
  - The First Day of Christmas (collects #1–3, tpb, 120 pages, 2021, ISBN 1-5343-2058-X)
  - On a Cold Winter's Night (collects #4–6, tpb, 120 pages, 2022, ISBN 1-5343-2459-3)
  - Christmas Time is Here Again (collects #7–9, tpb, 128 pages, 2024, ISBN 1-5343-2459-3)

== Screenwriting credits ==
=== Television ===
- Westworld
  - "Dissonance Theory" (Co-Writer)
- Too Old to Die Young
  - "Volume 1: The Devil" (Co-Writer)
  - 'Volume 2: The Lovers" (Co-Writer)
  - "Volume 3: The Hermit" (Co-Writer)
  - "Volume 4: The Tower" (Co-Writer)
  - "Volume 5: The Fool" (Co-Writer)
  - "Volume 6: The High Priestess" (Co-Writer)
  - "Volume 7: The Magician" (Co-Writer)
  - "Volume 8: The Hanged Man" (Co-Writer)
  - "Volume 9: The Empress" (Co-Writer)
- Batman: Caped Crusader
  - "Kiss of the Catwoman"
  - "The Night of the Hunters"
  - "Savage Night"

Preceded by Larry Hama	Batman writer 2000–2002	Succeeded by Jeph Loeb
Preceded by John Francis Moore	Catwoman writer 2002–2005	Succeeded by Will Pfeifer
Preceded by Greg Rucka	Detective Comics writer 2003	Succeeded by Andersen Gabrych
Preceded by Robbie Morrison	The Authority writer 2004–2005	Succeeded by Grant Morrison
Preceded by Robert Kirkman	Captain America writer 2005–2012	Succeeded by Rick Remender
Preceded by Brian Michael Bendis	Daredevil writer 2006–2009 (with Greg Rucka in 2008)	Succeeded by Andy Diggle
Preceded by Chris Claremont	Uncanny X-Men writer 2006–2008	Succeeded by Matt Fraction
Preceded by Jim Mullaney (Iron Fist vol. 4)	The Immortal Iron Fist writer 2007–2008 (with Matt Fraction)	Succeeded by Duane Swierczynski
Preceded by n/a	Secret Avengers writer 2010–2011	Succeeded by Nick Spencer
