= Lowlife (comics) =

Comic book series created early in Ed Brubaker's career

- Cover of A Complete Lowlife (1997) for the trade paperback collected edition, art by Ed Brubaker.

Publication information
- Publisher: Caliber Comics, MU Press
- Format: Limited series
- Genre: Crime
- Publication date: 1992–1995
- No. of issues: 5

Creative team
- Written by: Ed Brubaker
- Artist: Ed Brubaker

Collected editions
- A Complete Lowlife: ISBN 0-9698874-7-7

Lowlife is a semi-autobiographical comic book series written and drawn by Ed Brubaker, originally published by Caliber Comics and later Aeon Press. Collected editions were put out by Aeon and Black Eye Books.

The Comics Journal described the book as following the "frustration and cynicism of disenchanted slacker kids finding excitement in their uneventful lives". The series was described by The Stranger as "part fiction, part autobiography, the narratives hover between sincerity and parody, with moments of transcendence that lift it out of the realm of the ordinary comic book".

Brubaker cited his work here as an influence on later works:

I'm exploring the same themes in my Batman comics and my Catwoman comics that I was probably exploring in Lowlife: family relationships, personal relationships, people not being able to escape their past. . . . That's the stuff that interests me, and that's the stuff I write about.

== Development and publication history ==
Lowlife was Brubaker's first professional work. The work is semi-autobiographical, based upon the lives of the author and his friends but "with the names changed".

Lowlife debuted in 1992 with two issues published by Caliber Comics. Issues #3–5 were published in 1994–1995 by the MU Press imprint Aeon Press.

== Collected editions ==
The series has been collected into a number of trade paperbacks:

- The Portable Lowlife (48 pages, Aeon, 1995, ISBN 1-883847-16-8)
- A Complete Lowlife (112 pages, Black Eye Books, 1997, ISBN 0-9698874-7-7, Top Shelf Productions, 2001, ISBN 1-891830-20-1)
