= 2011 Scream Awards =

2010 USA film awards

6th Scream Awards
- Announced on: October 18, 2011
- Presented on: October 16, 2011
- Produced by: executive producers: Casey Patterson; Michael Levitt; Cindy Levitt; supervising producers: Greg Stills; producers: Austin Reading
- Directed by: Hamish Hamilton
- Official website: www.scream.spike.com

Highlights
- Most awards: Harry Potter and the Deathly Hallows – Part 2
- Most nominations: Harry Potter and the Deathly Hallows – Part 2 and X-Men: First Class

Television coverage
- Network: Spike TV
- Duration: 2 hours

Billed as 2011 Scream Awards, the 2011 ceremony of the Scream Awards, run by Spike TV, was the sixth and final iteration of these awards, which was run annually in prior years. The awards ceremony was held on 15 October 2011 on the Universal Studios lot in Hollywood (California, Los Angeles) and was broadcast by Spike TV on the following Tuesday (18 October 2011). The discontinuance of these awards was attributed to their dwindling popularity and Spike TV's re-formatting (including even a change of their name to Paramount).

The shows original creators, Casey Patterson, Michael Levitt and Cindy Levitt, served as executive producers for the event. Casey Patterson said that it was "a show for the most passionate fans on earth and beyond" and that "This is their night to celebrate the magical, mind-bending and super heroic year in movies and the TV shows that they love."

== World Premieres ==
The following pieces of footage from several upcoming movie projects was shown:

Movie Premiers
Content Premiered	Presenters
Total Recall	
The Woman In Black	Samuel L. Jackson
Paranormal Activity 3	
Sherlock Holmes: A Game of Shadows	Robert Downey Jr.
Ghost Rider: Spirit of Vengeance	Nicolas Cage

== Competitive categories ==
The Scream 2010 nominees were selected by the Advisory Board of Hollywood and Genre Leaders, who also advised on the categories. The advisory board included Damon Lindelof, Eli Roth, George A. Romero, John Carpenter, Rob Zombie, Robert Rodriguez, Roland Emmerich, Tim Burton, and Wes Craven etc. Voting was conducted via a website form on the Spike TV web portal.

The exception was the "Most Anticipated Movie" category, which was conducted via an "Online Write-In" mechanism, where each participant offered their own nomination for their vote via email to Spike TV. This "Online Write-In" category was advertised as "a category that will be decided by the fans who make Scream possible."

All films, television shows and comic books were deemed eligible for nomination if they were released between July 17, 2010, and July 29, 2011, and were representative of the genres listed. The works which were noted as having received a significant number of nominations were:-

Winners and nominees
Movie	Nominations
Harry Potter and the Deathly Hallows – Part 2	14
X-Men: First Class	14
Captain America: The First Avenger	11
Thor	9
True Blood	7
Game of Thrones	7
AMC’s The Walking Dead	6

The winners were chosen by a process of public online voting on the Spike TV website, which ran from 7 September 2011. The winners were announced at the live ceremony (Saturday, 15 October 2010). The nominees and winners of the 2011 Scream Awards were as follows:-

Winners and nominees
Award	Recipient	Result
Ultimate Scream (presented by Samuel L. Jackson)	Black Swan	Nominated
Ultimate Scream (presented by Samuel L. Jackson)	Captain America: The First Avenger	Nominated
Ultimate Scream (presented by Samuel L. Jackson)	Game of Thrones	Nominated
Ultimate Scream (presented by Samuel L. Jackson)	Harry Potter and the Deathly Hallows – Part 2	Won
Ultimate Scream (presented by Samuel L. Jackson)	Scott Pilgrim vs. the World	Nominated
Ultimate Scream (presented by Samuel L. Jackson)	Super 8	Nominated
Ultimate Scream (presented by Samuel L. Jackson)	Thor	Nominated
Ultimate Scream (presented by Samuel L. Jackson)	True Blood	Nominated
Ultimate Scream (presented by Samuel L. Jackson)	The Walking Dead	Nominated
Ultimate Scream (presented by Samuel L. Jackson)	X-Men: First Class	Nominated
Best Science Fiction Movie	Captain America: The First Avenger	Nominated
Best Science Fiction Movie	Monsters	Nominated
Best Science Fiction Movie	Super 8	Won
Best Science Fiction Movie	Transformers: Dark of the Moon	Nominated
Best Science Fiction Movie	Tron: Legacy	Nominated
Best Fantasy Movie	Black Swan	Nominated
Best Fantasy Movie	Harry Potter and the Deathly Hallows – Part 2	Nominated
Best Fantasy Movie	Pirates of the Caribbean: On Stranger Tides	Nominated
Best Fantasy Movie	Thor	Nominated
Best Fantasy Movie	X-Men: First Class	Won
Best Horror Movie	I Saw the Devil	Nominated
Best Horror Movie	Insidious	Nominated
Best Horror Movie	Let Me In	Won
Best Horror Movie	Paranormal Activity 2	Nominated
Best Horror Movie	Piranha 3D	Nominated
Best Thriller	The Adjustment Bureau	Nominated
Best Thriller	Hanna	Nominated
Best Thriller	Limitless	Won
Best Thriller	Red	Nominated
Best Thriller	Salt	Nominated
Best TV Show	Doctor Who	Nominated
Best TV Show	Fringe	Nominated
Best TV Show	Game of Thrones	Won
Best TV Show	True Blood	Nominated
Best TV Show	The Walking Dead	Nominated
Best Director	J. J. Abrams, Super 8	Nominated
Best Director	Darren Aronofsky, Black Swan	Won
Best Director	Matthew Vaughn, X-Men: First Class	Nominated
Best Director	Edgar Wright, Scott Pilgrim vs. the World	Nominated
Best Director	David Yates, Harry Potter and the Deathly Hallows – Part 2	Nominated
Best Scream-Play	Black Swan	Nominated
Best Scream-Play	Harry Potter and the Deathly Hallows – Part 2	Won
Best Scream-Play	Scott Pilgrim vs. the World	Nominated
Best Scream-Play	Super 8	Nominated
Best Scream-Play	X-Men: First Class	Nominated
Best Chase Scene	Chase Through London, Pirates of the Caribbean: On Stranger Tides	Won
Best Chase Scene	The Highway Chase, Transformers: Dark of the Moon	Nominated
Best Chase Scene	Light Jet Battle and Escape, Tron: Legacy	Nominated
Best Chase Scene	Streets of Brooklyn Chase, Captain America: The First Avenger	Nominated
Best Chase Scene	Open Door Chase Through Manhattan, The Adjustment Bureau	Nominated
Best Fantasy Actress	Penélope Cruz, Pirates of the Caribbean: On Stranger Tides	Nominated
Best Fantasy Actress	Lena Headey, Game of Thrones	Nominated
Best Fantasy Actress	Jennifer Lawrence, X-Men: First Class	Nominated
Best Fantasy Actress	Natalie Portman, Black Swan	Won
Best Fantasy Actress	Emma Watson, Harry Potter and the Deathly Hallows – Part 2	Nominated
Best Fantasy Actor	Sean Bean, Game of Thrones	Nominated
Best Fantasy Actor	Johnny Depp, Pirates of the Caribbean: On Stranger Tides	Nominated
Best Fantasy Actor	Michael Fassbender, X-Men: First Class	Nominated
Best Fantasy Actor	James McAvoy, X-Men: First Class	Nominated
Best Fantasy Actor	Daniel Radcliffe, Harry Potter and the Deathly Hallows – Part 2	Won
Best Science Fiction Actress	Hayley Atwell, Captain America: The First Avenger	Nominated
Best Science Fiction Actress	Karen Gillan, Doctor Who	Nominated
Best Science Fiction Actress	Milla Jovovich, Resident Evil: Afterlife	Won
Best Science Fiction Actress	Anna Torv, Fringe	Nominated
Best Science Fiction Actress	Olivia Wilde, Tron: Legacy	Nominated
Best Science Fiction Actor	Daniel Craig, Cowboys & Aliens	Nominated
Best Science Fiction Actor	Chris Evans, Captain America: The First Avenger	Nominated
Best Science Fiction Actor	Harrison Ford, Cowboys & Aliens	Nominated
Best Science Fiction Actor	Jake Gyllenhaal, Source Code	Nominated
Best Science Fiction Actor	Matt Smith, Doctor Who	Won
Best Horror Actress	Rose Byrne, Insidious	Nominated
Best Horror Actress	Sarah Wayne Callies, The Walking Dead	Nominated
Best Horror Actress	Neve Campbell, Scream 4	Nominated
Best Horror Actress	Chloë Grace Moretz, Let Me In	Won
Best Horror Actress	Anna Paquin, True Blood	Nominated
Best Horror Actor	Michael C. Hall, Dexter	Nominated
Best Horror Actor	Andrew Lincoln, The Walking Dead	Nominated
Best Horror Actor	Stephen Moyer, True Blood	Nominated
Best Horror Actor	Alexander Skarsgård, True Blood	Won
Best Horror Actor	Patrick Wilson, Insidious	Nominated
Best Villain	Kevin Bacon as Sebastian Shaw, X-Men: First Class	Nominated
Best Villain	Satya Bhabha, Chris Evans, Brandon Routh, Mae Whitman, Shota Saito, Keita Saito and Jason Schwartzman as The League of Evil Exes, Scott Pilgrim vs. the World	Nominated
Best Villain	Ralph Fiennes as Lord Voldemort, Harry Potter and the Deathly Hallows – Part 2	Won
Best Villain	Choi Min-sik as Kyung-chul, I Saw the Devil	Nominated
Best Villain	Hugo Weaving as the Red Skull, Captain America: The First Avenger	Nominated
Best Superhero	Chris Evans as Captain America, Captain America: The First Avenger	Won
Best Superhero	Chris Hemsworth as Thor, Thor	Nominated
Best Superhero	James McAvoy as Professor X, X-Men: First Class	Nominated
Best Superhero	Ryan Reynolds as the Green Lantern, Green Lantern	Nominated
Best Superhero	Tom Welling as Clark Kent, Smallville	Nominated
Best Supporting Actress	Jaimie Alexander, Thor	Nominated
Best Supporting Actress	Laurie Holden, The Walking Dead	Nominated
Best Supporting Actress	Mila Kunis, Black Swan	Won
Best Supporting Actress	Helen Mirren, Red	Nominated
Best Supporting Actress	Ellen Wong, Scott Pilgrim vs. the World	Nominated
Best Supporting Actor	Kieran Culkin, Scott Pilgrim vs. the World	Nominated
Best Supporting Actor	Peter Dinklage, Game of Thrones	Won
Best Supporting Actor	Rupert Grint, Harry Potter and the Deathly Hallows – Part 1	Nominated
Best Supporting Actor	Tommy Lee Jones, Captain America: The First Avenger	Nominated
Best Supporting Actor	Alan Rickman, Harry Potter and the Deathly Hallows – Part 2	Nominated
Breakout Performance - Female	Jaimie Alexander, Thor	Nominated
Breakout Performance - Female	Hayley Atwell, Captain America: The First Avenger	Nominated
Breakout Performance - Female	Emilia Clarke, Game of Thrones	Won
Breakout Performance - Female	Elle Fanning, Super 8	Nominated
Breakout Performance - Female	Zoë Kravitz, X-Men: First Class	Nominated
Breakout Performance - Male	Jon Bernthal, The Walking Dead	Nominated
Breakout Performance - Male	Michael Fassbender, X-Men: First Class	Nominated
Breakout Performance - Male	Chris Hemsworth, Thor	Nominated
Breakout Performance - Male	Tom Hiddleston, Thor	Nominated
Breakout Performance - Male	Joe Manganiello, True Blood	Won
Best Cameo	Buzz Aldrin, Transformers: Dark of the Moon	Nominated
Best Cameo	Kristen Bell and Anna Paquin, Scream 4	Nominated
Best Cameo	Richard Dreyfuss, Piranha 3D	Nominated
Best Cameo	Hugh Jackman, X-Men: First Class	Won
Best Cameo	Keith Richards, Pirates of the Caribbean: On Stranger Tides	Nominated
Best Ensemble	Game of Thrones	Nominated
Best Ensemble	Harry Potter and the Deathly Hallows – Part 2	Nominated
Best Ensemble	Red	Nominated
Best Ensemble	True Blood	Won
Best Ensemble	X-Men: First Class	Nominated
Most Memorable Mutilation	Head Covered in Molten Gold, Game of Thrones	Nominated
Most Memorable Mutilation	Penis Bitten Off, Then Vomited Up By Piranha, Piranha 3D	Nominated
Most Memorable Mutilation	The Reverse Bear-Trap, Saw 3D: The Final Chapter	Nominated
Most Memorable Mutilation	Scalped Alive by Motorboat, Piranha 3D	Won
Most Memorable Mutilation	Transformed Into Swan, Black Swan	Nominated
Fight Scene of the Year	Airport Cargo Yard Fight, Red	Nominated
Fight Scene of the Year	The Battle of Hogwarts, Harry Potter and the Deathly Hallows – Part 2	Nominated
Fight Scene of the Year	Final Battle: Captain America vs. Red Skull, Captain America: The First Avenger	Nominated
Fight Scene of the Year	Final Battle: Harry Potter vs. Lord Voldemort, Harry Potter and the Deathly Hallows – Part 2	Nominated
Fight Scene of the Year	Final Battle: Scott Pilgrim and Knives vs. Gideon Graves, Scott Pilgrim vs. the World	Won
Holy Sh!t Scene of the Year	Escape From Collapsing Building, Transformers: Dark of the Moon	Nominated
Holy Sh!t Scene of the Year	Light Cycle Battle, Tron: Legacy	Nominated
Holy Sh!t Scene of the Year	The Room of Requirement Fiendfyre, Harry Potter and the Deathly Hallows – Part 2	Won
Holy Sh!t Scene of the Year	The Train Crash, Super 8	Nominated
Best Independent Movie	Another Earth	Nominated
Best Independent Movie	Hatchet II	Nominated
Best Independent Movie	I Saw the Devil	Nominated
Best Independent Movie	Monsters	Won
Best Independent Movie	Rubber	Nominated
Best 3-D Movie	Captain America: The First Avenger	Nominated
Best 3-D Movie	Harry Potter and the Deathly Hallows – Part 2	Nominated
Best 3-D Movie	Piranha 3D	Nominated
Best 3-D Movie	Transformers: Dark of the Moon	Won
Best 3-D Movie	Tron: Legacy	Nominated
Best F/X	Harry Potter and the Deathly Hallows – Part 2	Won
Best F/X	Sucker Punch	Nominated
Best F/X	Thor	Nominated
Best F/X	Transformers: Dark of the Moon	Nominated
Best F/X	Tron: Legacy	Nominated
Best Comic Book or Graphic Novel	American Vampire	Nominated
Best Comic Book or Graphic Novel	Chew	Nominated
Best Comic Book or Graphic Novel	Daytripper	Nominated
Best Comic Book or Graphic Novel	Locke & Key	Nominated
Best Comic Book or Graphic Novel	The Walking Dead	Won
Best Comic Book Writer	Ed Brubaker, Captain America, Captain America: Reborn, The Marvels Project, Steve Rogers: Super Soldier	Won
Best Comic Book Writer	Joe Hill, Locke & Key, The Cape	Nominated
Best Comic Book Writer	Robert Kirkman, The Astounding Wolf-Man, Haunt, Invincible, The Walking Dead	Nominated
Best Comic Book Writer	Grant Morrison, Batman Incorporated, Joe the Barbarian	Nominated
Best Comic Book Writer	Mike Mignola, Baltimore, The Amazing Screw-on Head	Nominated
Best Comic Book Artist	Charlie Adlard, The Walking Dead	Nominated
Best Comic Book Artist	Mark Buckingham, Fables	Nominated
Best Comic Book Artist	Duncan Fegredo, Hellboy	Nominated
Best Comic Book Artist	John Romita, Jr., Avengers, Kick-Ass 2	Won
Best Comic Book Artist	Bernie Wrightson, Doc Macabre	Nominated
Best Comic Book Movie	Captain America: The First Avenger	Nominated
Best Comic Book Movie	Cowboys & Aliens	Nominated
Best Comic Book Movie	Scott Pilgrim vs. the World	Won
Best Comic Book Movie	Thor	Nominated
Best Comic Book Movie	X-Men: First Class	Nominated
Most Anticipated Movie ^{†}	The Dark Knight Rises	Won

† - "Online Write-In" award.

== Special awards ==
The special achievement award recipients of the 2011 Scream Awards were as follows:-

Winners and nominees
Award	Recipient
Comic-Con Icon Award| June Foray
Farewell Tribute	Harry Potter
Hero Award	Robert Downey Jr.
Maverick Award	Nicolas Cage
Ultimate Villain Award	Darth Vader
Visionary Award	Pee-Wee Herman
