= David Murphy (Irish writer) =

Irish writer and editor (born 1953)

- Born: 1953 (age 72–73)
- Occupation: Writer of speculative fiction
- Website: davidmurph.wordpress.com

David Murphy is an Irish writer, primarily in the area of science fiction. He was born in Cork in 1953. He was a founding editor of the speculative fiction magazine Albedo One and co-ordinator of the Aeon Award. He has published several short story collections and a novel and novellas, and a poetry collection.

== Early life and career ==
Murphy was born in Cork. His main initial career was as a teacher but he left that profession in 2003 to pursue literary work full-time.

== Writing and editorial career ==
Murphy's short fiction has been published internationally, including in translation, and has been recognised with awards. His work has been published on over one hundred occasions. His earliest writing of genre interest was "Undertow", published in the magazine FTL in 1989. "Shelter", in a later edition of the same periodical, explored themes of sectarianism and class in the context of a nuclear war.

A number of Murphy's stories were gathered in his 1995 chapbook Broken Heroes (Albedo One Productions, 1995), others in Alienations: Stories of the Near Future (Piper's Ash, 1998, UK). His short story collection Lost Notes was brought out in Dublin in 2004 and reprinted in 2013. The title story of that collection won the inaugural Maurice Walsh Award for short stories in 2005. He has also been short-listed for the Molly Keane and Aisling Gheal awards.

He was a founding editor of in 1993 of Albedo One, considered "one of the more cosmopolitan sf Print Magazines". He would step down from this position in 2013. He was co-ordinator of the Aeon Award, an annual award for the best original short story, and a contributor of interest to the magazine.

The novella Arkon Chronicles was published in the US by Silver Lake Publishing in 2003. The dystopian novel Longevity City (2005) explores biopunk, corporate dystopian and climate fictional themes. It was published by Five Star in the US and was described by writer Bob Neilson as "well-received" Murphy singled out Longevity City as "probably the best of my novels and novellas" as of 2012. A contemporary fantasy novella Bird of Prey came out in 2011, published in the United States by Damnation Books.

Murphy's poetry been featured multiple times on RTÉ and published on platforms such as The Stinging Fly and Kaleidotrope. He has made guest appearances including at Mountshannon Arts and at On The Nail.

In 2020 Murphy published a debut poetry collection, Drowning in the Desert, having returned to writing poetry in his 50s. The collection was published by Limerick's Revival Press. Walking on Ripples (2014), a book with five chapters of fiction alternating with six of memoir, all themed around water, was published by Dublin's Liffey Press. It is his first book to include non-fiction.

== Reception ==
Writer Bob Neilson noted that Longevity City was "well-received" and that several of Murphy's short story collections were "award-winning". Albedo One, of which Murphy was both co-editor and a contributor of interest, was noted for "bravely exploring the more oppressed areas of the world and bringing hope through solidarity or perseverance". It won three European SF Society awards and a "good number" of stories were selected from it for Year's Best anthologies.

Regarding the title story of the collection Lost Notes, Dr David Marcus described it as a story which "approaches greatness". Roelof Goudriaan described the book as conveying "every subtle distinction, every smell, every shade" of "what Ireland is and could become." Robert Neilson described the author as one of the "most exciting writers exploring the boundaries of the modern short story in Ireland today."

The Irish Times described Walking on Ripples as a fishing book "in the great literary or romantic tradition – reflective, speculative, full of allegory, memory and metaphor" and "Walking on Ripples is that rare creature: a fiction-memoir, a daring blend of fact and award-winning invention, a hybrid rarely seen and seldom caught."

== Personal life ==
Murphy has lived in northern County Dublin for over forty years, though in recent times he can often be found in County Waterford.
