= Scene of the Crime (comics) =

1999 comic by Ed Brubaker

- Cover for issue #1, art by Michael Lark.

Publication information
- Publisher: Vertigo
- Schedule: Monthly
- Format: limited series
- Genre: Crime, mystery
- Publication date: May - August 1999
- No. of issues: 4

Creative team
- Created by: Ed Brubaker; Michael Lark
- Written by: Ed Brubaker
- Penciller: Michael Lark
- Inker: Sean Phillips
- Letterer: John Costanza
- Colorist: James Sinclair
- Editor(s): Jennifer Lee; Shelly Roeberg

Collected editions
- Scene of the Crime: ISBN 1-60706-632-7

Scene of the Crime is a four-issue comic book miniseries published in 1999 by DC Comics' Vertigo imprint, written by Ed Brubaker, pencilled and inked by Michael Lark and also inked by Sean Phillips following the first issue.

Scene of the Crime follows private detective Jack Herriman as he is hired to track down a missing person in and around San Francisco. Herriman is in his mid-to-late twenties and runs his office from the first floor of an art gallery called Scene of The Crime, which is owned and operated by his uncle Knut Herriman. In the story, Knut is a famous crime scene photographer and uses his reputation to aid Jack at several points throughout the story.

== Development ==
Brubaker pitched the series to Vertigo after schooling himself on the legacy of American hardboiled fiction, including authors Raymond Chandler, Dashiell Hammett, and — most significantly — Ross Macdonald. Brubaker noted that one of the factors that drew him to detective stories was their willingness to tackles "subjects and themes that were fairly surprising" and "address issues that are close to home". As Brubaker said:

It was Macdonald's work more than anyone else's, his delving into the kind of things that can haunt you forever, that inspired me to write about my own demons, and those of my generation, in the form of a mystery.

== Plot ==
Jack Herriman is hired by Alex Jordan on the recommendation of Jack's father's friend Detective Sergeant Paul Reynolds SFPD. Jordan is trying to find her younger sister Maggie, who has been missing for nearly a month. Herriman follows Maggie's trail to an open house for a commune called Lunarhouse, which continues the ideals of the Summer of Love in modern-day San Francisco. Jack confronts the charismatic leader Joseph Luna about Maggie. Luna feigns ignorance but directs Jack to the commune secretary. The secretary informs Jack that Maggie was indeed at the commune for a few weeks but left suddenly with no explanation. She also informs Jack that Maggie had slept with Luna, but brushed off the detail, saying that Luna slept with everybody. Later, Jack sneaks outside and rifles though the house recycling bin, finding a phone message from Maggie and a contact number that leads to a motel upstate.

Reluctant to stake out the motel himself, Jack takes along his uncle Knut. When Maggie finally turns up at her motel room, she is drunk and being robbed by the guy she came home with. Herriman tries to fight the man but is taken by surprise and winded. Knut then manages to scare the guy off with his camera flash. They take Maggie inside and dump her in the bathtub.

When Maggie awakens, Jack interrogates her about her disappearance and learns that Maggie has lived a wild life due to feeling lost. After talking for a while, Jack drops off Maggie back at her motel and leaves, with the idea of perhaps talking to her again later. It is also hinted that he is attracted to her.

This all comes to an end the next morning, when Jack receives a phone call that Maggie's body was found shot to death in her motel, probably soon after Jack had dropped her off. Initially believing that Maggie was involved in some sort of blackmail scheme, police later discover that a suitcase filled with $10,000 was left untouched in Maggie's closet, meaning Maggie's death was not money-related, and that something bigger than blackmail was going on.

Heartbroken and frustrated, Jack begins yet another round of investigations.

In his investigations, Jack learns that Joseph Luna's name is actually Virgil. From pictures his Uncle Knut took several years before, Jack discovers that Virgil was the leader of yet another compound similar to Luna House, and that it burned down. Knut further finds a photograph featuring a young Maggie, her sister Jordan, and their mother standing before a dead body. The body was that of their father, Geoff, who died in the fire along with 12 other people. Virgil was also reported to have died in the fire, but Jack does not believe this.

Jack decides to interrogate survivors of the fire for information. When asking one of the survivors about the fire, the girl revealed that the fire started in the children's dorm, and no one knows who started it. She also seems to harbor hatred towards Virgil, claiming that he ruined her life, and reveals, to Jack's horror, that half of her face is scarred from the burns.

As the investigation continues, another twist in the case comes up when Maggie's mother visits Jack at Knut's house (where Jack has been living to try and clean up from his previous drug and alcohol addictions). Maggie's mother sees the photograph of herself standing with her daughters before her dead husband, which had been put on display in Knut's public gallery. The mother reveals that Maggie started the fire, and alludes that she was a pyromaniac. She further explains to Jack how free love at the communals, such as Luna House, worked. The parents at the communal lived separate from their children. The children were all put together and placed in their own dormitory, where adults would take turns taking shifts to watch the kids. In the meantime, the parents would indulge in Free Love, but Virgil soon began encouraging the children to participate in sexual activities too. He wanted the children to have experience and to "find themselves". This escalated to the men of the compound taking sexual advantage of the children. In proof of this, Jack finds a picture of Virgil raping one of the then-young Jordan sisters.

Jacks investigation continues, and he finds further secrets, and discovers that the Jordans did not reveal all the details of their family problems to him.

== Collected editions ==
The series has been collected into a trade paperback:

- Scene of the Crime: A Little Piece of Goodnight (112 pages, May 2000, ISBN 1-56389-670-2)

A hardcover collection of the series was released in November 2012 by Image Comics:

- Scene of the Crime (128 pages, Nov 2012, ISBN 978-1-60706-632-3)

== Awards ==
- 2000: Nominated for "Best Limited Series" Eisner Award
