= Batman: Gotham Noir =

2001 DC Comics graphic novel

Publication information
- Publisher: DC Comics
- Publication date: March 2001
- No. of issues: 1
- Main character: James Gordon

Creative team
- Written by: Ed Brubaker
- Penciller: Sean Phillips
- Inker: Sean Phillips
- Letterer: Bill Oakley
- Colorist: Dave Stewart

Batman: Gotham Noir is an Elseworlds graphic novel published by DC Comics in 2001, written by Ed Brubaker, with art by Sean Phillips. It was reprinted in Batman: The Man Who Laughs Deluxe Edition.

== Plot ==
Gotham Noir takes place in 1949. Jim Gordon is the main character, with Batman making infrequent appearances. Bruce Wayne and Gordon served together during World War II. Gordon is an alcoholic private detective who used to be a police officer. He is estranged from his wife, Sarah, and their daughter, Barbara.

Gordon was in a relationship with Selina Kyle, but she left him as his alcohol dependency grew worse. She runs a nightclub and one day offers him a side job of accompanying her friend Rachel to a party. When Rachel is murdered, Gordon is the prime suspect. He is framed for Rachel's murder by a corrupt mayor with ties to organized crime.

Other characters from Batman-lore, such as Joker and Harvey Dent, also appear in Gotham Noir.

== Batman in Noir Alley-TCM tie-in ==
DC Comics partnered with TCM to promote the cable network's Noir Alley programming. DC published a free comic book, Batman in Noir Alley, which involves Batman and TCM host Eddie Muller solving a crime together. This book was available for free at select stores on 20 September 2017 as well as at the New York Comic Con. After Batman leaves the story, Muller "breaks the fourth wall" to introduce Gotham Noir. The remainder of the book re-prints the first 14 pages of Gotham Noir.

== Critical reaction ==
Batman: Gotham Noir has received some praise for its use of film noir tropes.

== See also ==
- List of Elseworlds publications
