= The Great Wall (soundtrack) =

The Great Wall: Original Motion Picture Soundtrack

Soundtrack album by Ramin Djawadi
- Released: December 16, 2016 (China); February 17, 2017 (Worldwide)
- Recorded: 2016
- Studio: AIR Lyndhurst Studios, London
- Genre: Film score
- Length: 66:26
- Label: Milan Entertainment
- Producer: Ramin Djawadi; Stefan Karrer (exec.); JC Chamboredon (exec.)

Ramin Djawadi chronology
Westworld: Season 1 (2016)	The Great Wall: Original Motion Picture Soundtrack (2016)	The Mountain Between Us (2017)

The Great Wall: Original Motion Picture Soundtrack is the soundtrack to the film of the same name. This music is composed by Ramin Djawadi and released on December 16, 2016, in China. The soundtrack was released on February 17, 2017, worldwide. The Vinyl version was released in March 2017. Ramin Djawadi in composing the score, Djawadi wanted to echo the film's bridging of eastern and western culture by combining a big Hollywood symphony orchestra with iconic Chinese solo instruments. It gives the score a lot of different colors, variety of themes. Brandon Campbell provided additional music for the film.

== Track listing ==
All music by Ramin Djawadi, except where noted.

No.	Title	Length
1.	"Nameless Order"	4:26
2.	"Prologue"	1:49
3.	"What a Wall"	3:45
4.	"The Great Wall"	4:29
5.	"First Battle"	7:38
6.	"Captive Heroes"	1:38
7.	"A Clean Start"	2:27
8.	"We Are Not the Same"	3:17
9.	"Xiao Long, General"	1:33
10.	"At the Border" (By Zhao Muyang & Wang Leehom)	1:29
11.	"Foggy Loyalty" (Ramin Djawadi, Brandon Campbell)	3:01
12.	"Fog and Fire"	3:00
13.	"The Greed of Man"	1:56
14.	"Fools and Thieves" (Ramin Djawadi, Brandon Campbell)	3:15
15.	"The Great Experiment"	2:53
16.	"Bianling Boogie"	3:43
17.	"Tower Tactics"	4:19
18.	"Powder Rangers"	3:27
19.	"Xin Ren"	3:55
20.	"Bridge of Fate" (By Wang Leehom & Tan Weiwei)	4:26
Total length:		66:26
