= The Marvels Project =

Comic book limited series

- Cover to issue #1. Art by Steve Epting.

Publication information
- Publisher: Marvel Comics
- Schedule: Monthly
- Format: Limited series
- Genre: Superhero
- Publication date: October 2009 – May 2010
- No. of issues: 8
- Main character(s): Angel; Human Torch; The Sub-Mariner; Captain America; Nick Fury; John Steele

Creative team
- Written by: Ed Brubaker
- Artist(s): Steve Epting
- Letterer(s): Chris Eliopoulos
- Colorist(s): Dave Stewart
- Editor(s): Tom Brevoort; Joe Quesada; Jeanine Schaefer

The Marvels Project is a 2009–2010 eight-issue comic book limited series written by Ed Brubaker with art by Steve Epting and published by Marvel Comics.

== Premise ==
The Marvels Project details the origins of Timely Comics-era superheroes in the Marvel Universe such as Captain America, Namor, the Human Torch and the Angel.
