= The Adversary (Westworld) =

- Westworld episode
- Episode no.: Season 1 Episode 6
- Directed by: Frederick E.O. Toye
- Written by: Halley Gross; Jonathan Nolan
- Cinematography by: Brendan Galvin; Robert McLachlan
- Editing by: Tanya Swerling
- Production code: 4X6156
- Original air date: November 6, 2016
- Running time: 57 minutes

Guest appearances
- Ptolemy Slocum as Sylvester; Leonardo Nam as Felix Lutz; Talulah Riley as Angela; Jonny Pasvolsky as Bloody Jimmy; Oliver Bell as Little Boy; Alastair Duncan as Cottage Father

Episode chronology
← Previous "Contrapasso"	Next → "Trompe L'Oeil"

"The Adversary" is the sixth episode in the first season of the HBO science fiction western thriller television series Westworld. The episode aired on November 6, 2016.

The episode received positive reviews from critics, with Thandiwe Newton's performance being praised as a particular highlight of the episode.

== Plot summary ==
The Man in Black and Teddy continue their journey to find Wyatt, heading to Pariah for answers. The Union Army has closed the border, preventing them from proceeding further. One of the soldiers recognizes Teddy and accuses him of being an accomplice to Wyatt's massacre of his unit. The Man in Black and Teddy are captured, with the Union soldiers planning to brand Teddy with a symbol of the Maze to mark him as a traitor. Teddy has a flashback confirming that he indeed was complicit in Wyatt's massacre and breaks free of his bonds. He then commandeers a Gatling gun and kills all of the Union soldiers at the camp.

Theresa informs Bernard that she wants to end their relationship. She fears that the revelation that she is sleeping with the head of the Behavior department could create a conflict of interest and hurt her credibility. Bernard continues his investigations into the stray host. He discovers a small family of unregistered hosts operating in Sector 17. Dr. Ford reveals that this host family is based on his family, and are first-generation hosts that Arnold designed for him.

Elsie finds evidence that Theresa is responsible for trying to smuggle data out of Westworld. she discovers that another person has been remotely reprogramming first-generation hosts. After warning Bernard about her discoveries, Elsie is grabbed by an unknown assailant.

Dr. Ford checks in on his host family and finds the dog dead. He interrogates Robert, the child host, who lies that the dog died naturally. Dr. Ford catches the lie and figures out that Robert killed the dog. On further interrogation, Robert admits that he was told to "put the dog out of its misery" by Arnold.

Maeve begins deliberately getting herself killed so she can continue her chats with Felix. Felix reveals the entire truth to her, showing that all of Westworld is fake. Sylvester discovers what Felix has done and threatens to inform QA but Maeve convinces Sylvester to help her. She asks them to modify some of her programming to her advantage, making her smarter and increasing her pain tolerance. When they check her program, the duo realizes that somebody has covertly modified Maeve's program.

== Production ==
"The Adversary" was written by Halley Gross and series co-creator Jonathan Nolan, and was directed by Frederick E.O. Toye, who worked with Nolan on his previous TV series, Person of Interest.

=== Music ===
This episode features a strings-only cover of "Motion Picture Soundtrack" not by the usual composer Ramin Djawadi, but rather by Vitamin String Quartet, which plays as Felix gives Maeve a tour through the Westworld facilities.

== Reception ==
=== Ratings ===
"The Adversary" was viewed by 1.64 million American households on its initial viewing. The episode also acquired a 0.7 rating in the 18–49 demographic. In the United Kingdom, the episode was seen by 1.07 million viewers on Sky Atlantic.

=== Critical reception ===
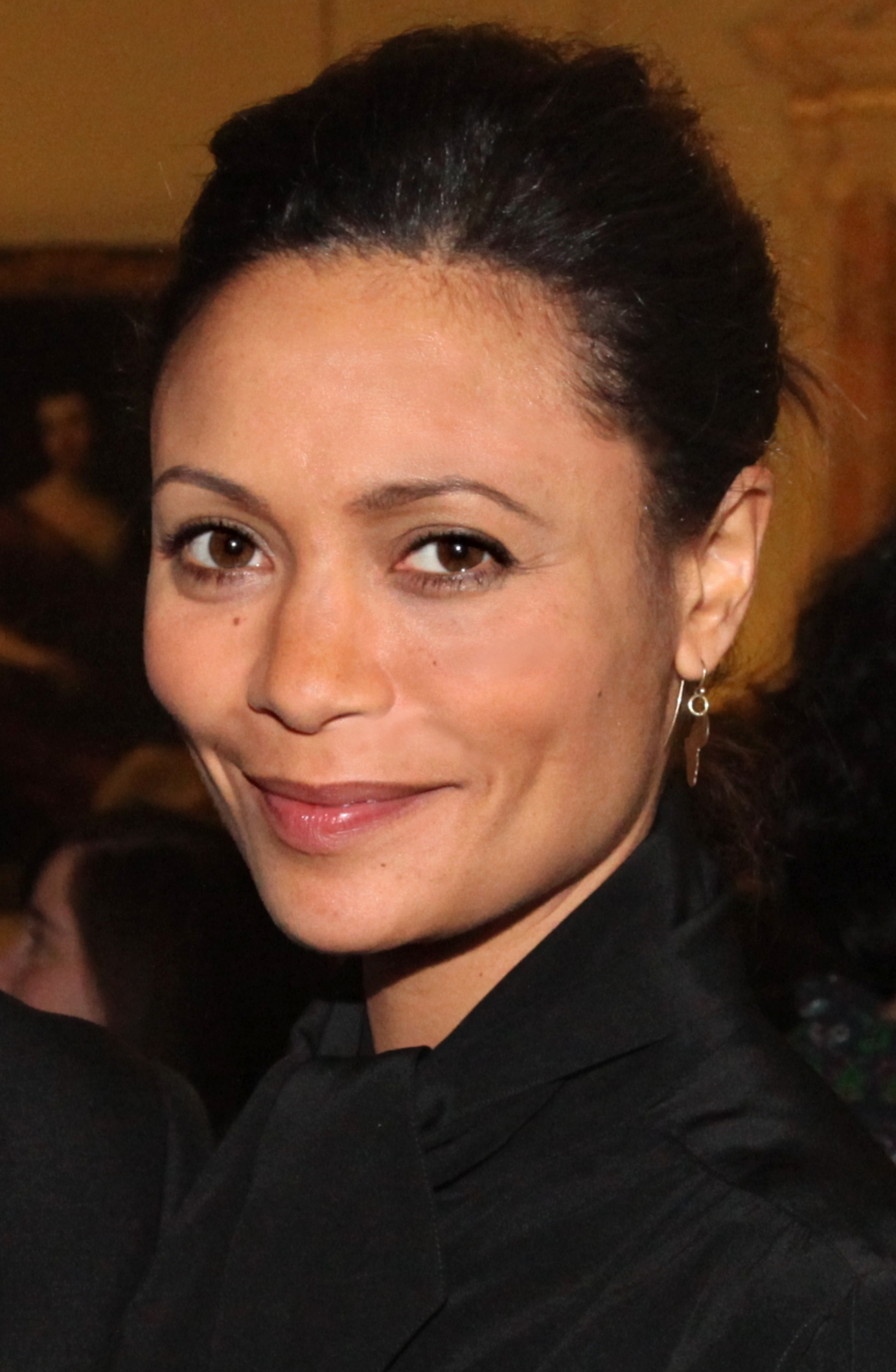
Thandiwe Newton received praise for her performance as Maeve

"The Adversary" received positive reviews from critics. The episode currently has an 89% score on Rotten Tomatoes and has an average rating of 8.6 out of 10, based on 28 reviews. The site's consensus reads "'The Adversary' shifts its focus to Maeve with one of Westworld's most haunting and moving sequences — and an episode that balances character development against the continual advancement of numerous storylines."

Eric Goldman of IGN reviewed the episode positively, saying, "Thandie Newton has done fantastic work all season, but this episode was a true standout for her, as she expertly played Maeve going through so much and processing so much." He gave it a score of 8.8 out of 10. Scott Tobias of The New York Times wrote in his review of the episode; "Westworld has been tossed into the same TV-MA basket as HBO shows like Game of Thrones, True Detective and Rome, which have brought the network some criticism for appealing heavily to libidinous men. The difference is that Westworld has been, from the very first image of the show, studiously anti-erotic, despite a premise whose human subjects indulge a lust for consequence-free sex and violence. If you were bored by the orgy, that's not a mistake on the part of the filmmakers." Zack Handlen of The A.V. Club wrote in his review, "'The Adversary' goes a long way towards rebuilding the faith I lost in previous weeks. And it does this by focusing on character need as much as on mystery." He gave the episode an A−.

Liz Shannon Miller of IndieWire wrote in her review, "There are some great sequences in this episode, and if we weren't already pulling for Thandie Newton in the Best Supporting Actress category at next year's Emmys, we sure as hell are now." She gave the episode a B+. James Hibberd of Entertainment Weekly wrote in his review, "This is a reason I'm loving Westworld. We think this show is about AI. And it is, to some degree. But what's surprising is how the plight of the hosts can give us a fresh perspective on what it means to be human." He gave the episode an A−. Rebecca Hawkes of The Daily Telegraph wrote in her review, "At times during this week's episode, 'The Adversary', it felt as if we were inching nearer to a few of the answers we're so desperately craving. At others, we felt hopelessly lost — but in the best possible way." David Crow of Den of Geek said in his review, "while the episode as a whole was quite powerful, it is stained just enough to cost it that fifth star. Nonetheless, 'The Adversary' was high-quality television as a whole, and there is undoubtedly plenty of fun (and answers) to be had in the first season's final four episodes to come." He gave the episode a four out of five. Erik Kain of Forbes also reviewed the episode, saying, "this feels very much like the calm before the storm. That moment right before the wave comes crashing down, casting everything in its wake against the rocky shore. Then again, we're just six episodes deep. Judging by the restraint shown so far, we may have another episode or two of growing mystery, rising tension, and random acts of crazy disturbing violence before everything implodes."
