= Contrapasso (Westworld) =

- Westworld episode
- Episode no.: Season 1 Episode 5
- Directed by: Jonny Campbell
- Story by: Dominic Mitchell; Lisa Joy
- Teleplay by: Lisa Joy
- Cinematography by: Robert McLachlan
- Editing by: Mark Yoshikawa
- Production code: 4X6155
- Original air date: October 30, 2016
- Running time: 57 minutes

Guest appearances
- Michael Wincott as Old Bill; Ptolemy Slocum as Sylvester; Leonardo Nam as Felix Lutz; James Landry Hébert as Slim Miller; Oliver Bell as Little Boy; Lili Bordan as Fortune Teller; Wade Williams as Captain Norris

Episode chronology
← Previous "Dissonance Theory"	Next → "The Adversary"

"Contrapasso" is the fifth episode in the first season of the HBO science fiction western thriller television series Westworld. The episode aired on October 30, 2016. The title makes reference to one of the few rules in Dante's Inferno; contrapasso is the idea that every sinner must have an equal and fitting punishment.

The episode received positive reviews from critics.

== Plot summary ==
In Operations, Dr. Ford asks Dolores about Arnold's death, since she was the last host to interact with him. She tells him Arnold's last instructions were to destroy the park, but she never did that. Dr. Ford leaves, but an unseen figure arrives, to which Dolores reports that she has not revealed anything. Elsie finds a satellite transmitter in the rogue host's body and suggests to Bernard someone is trying to smuggle data out of Westworld.

The Man in Black continues to search for Wyatt with Lawrence and Teddy. Teddy's wounds are severe, and the Man kills Lawrence to transfuse his blood for Teddy. The two continue and find a tavern where Dr. Ford waits for the Man. Ford asks the Man why he is seeking the maze, to which he responds that he is seeking "something true" believing Arnold had one more story to tell.

Logan, William, and Dolores travel with Slim to the town of Pariah. Logan tells William that the park is in financial trouble after one of its original founders mysteriously died. At Pariah, they meet El Lazo, Slim's boss with close ties to the Confederados, ex-Confederate soldiers turned outlaws.

El Lazo offers to recruit Logan and William into the Confederados if they help steal an army wagon of nitroglycerin for them. While William seeks a peaceful route, Logan takes the wagon with force, and on their return, they bicker over their methods, but Logan reminds him that William would not be an executive vice president at their company without his help. Dolores has more visions of a church and a maze and wanders Pariah. She wakes to see El Lazo replacing the nitroglycerin with tequila. She tries to warn William but he is apathetic from his argument with Logan. She pleads for his help to escape the park, expressing her need for him. Logan is captured when the Confederados discover the deception. William and Dolores flee by boarding a train, but spot El Lazo aboard, traveling with several coffins branded with a maze symbol, with bodies embalmed with the nitroglycerin. El Lazo surrenders to them and asks them to call him Lawrence.

Maeve and the other hosts from the saloon shootout are brought to operations. A technician, Felix, manages to fix the code for the bird. He loses sight of it as it is flying all over the room, and when he turns to look, he finds it sitting on an awake Maeve's finger. She tells him they need to talk.

== Production ==
The teleplay for "Contrapasso" was written by series co-creator Lisa Joy, from a story by Dominic Mitchell and Joy.

=== Filming ===
The episode was directed by Jonny Campbell. Production designer Zack Grobler drew inspiration from various cultures like Latin America and Africa to create the town of Pariah.

=== Music ===
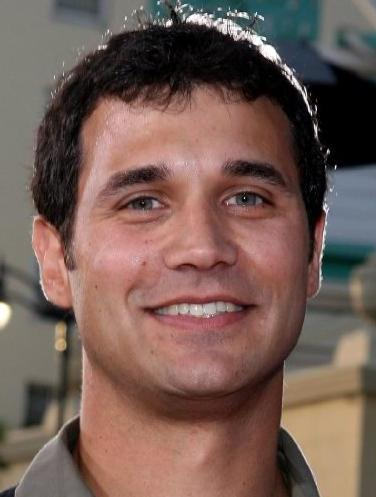
Composer Ramin Djawadi created the episode's musical score.

In an interview, composer Ramin Djawadi spoke about the song "Something I Can Never Have" by Nine Inch Nails, that was translated in the episode. He said, "You can kind of picture a string quartet being in the room somewhere, performing this song, in this setting, right?"

The episode also features the classical piece "Clair de Lune", by French composer Claude Debussy, which Ford is playing on the player piano as Teddy and The Man in Black enter the bar. As Ford leaves the bar, he snaps his fingers at the player piano and it plays a vastly sped up and slightly damaged version of Scott Joplin's "Pine Apple Rag". Djawadi is quoted as saying, "That's about control, It just shows the power he has. He calls the shots for what happens." (Note: Although the referenced article says it's "The Entertainer" that's playing, that is in fact incorrect, although Djawadi himself never says it's "The Entertainer" so it could be the error of a sub editor.)

== Reception ==
=== Ratings ===
"Contrapasso" was viewed by 1.49 million American households on its initial viewing. The episode also acquired a 0.7 rating in the 18–49 demographic. In the United Kingdom, the episode was seen by 1.07 million viewers on Sky Atlantic.

=== Critical reception ===
"Contrapasso" received positive reviews from critics. The episode currently has a 91% score on Rotten Tomatoes and has an average rating of 8.4 out of 10, based on 23 reviews. The site's consensus reads "Westworld subtly reveals more of its multitudinous plot layers and adds some substantial twists in the vexing fifth installment, 'Contrapasso.'"

Eric Goldman of IGN reviewed the episode positively, saying, "At the season's halfway point, Westworld isn't holding back. Dolores and Maeve's fascinating dual awakenings both are moving quickly, with Dolores inside the park completely subverting her intended role, while Maeve is looking to get answers inside the lab. The questions being raised at this point, both about the park's history and in what manner much of what we're seeing is unfolding, are also increasing in a compelling manner — though of course that does also increase the pressure for the series to provide satisfying answers in the long run. In the meantime, this is one hell of a ride." He gave it a score of 9 out of 10. Scott Tobias of The New York Times wrote in his review of the episode; "One of the more popular Westworld fan theories posits that the Man in Black and William are the same characters on separate timelines, but without indulging that theory too much, this episode does suggest some meaningful parallels." Zack Handlen of The A.V. Club wrote in his review, "There's momentum by the end, but it's unfocused. And really, that's why 'Contrapasso' concerns me. The show is clearly going somewhere, but I'm starting to wonder if the destination is going to be worth it." He gave the episode a B.

Liz Shannon Miller of IndieWire wrote in her review, "'Contrapasso' highlights one of Westworld's biggest themes — the importance of purpose in our modern lives. Ford's memory of a pet greyhound dog, who finally caught up with the prey he'd been chasing his whole life, spoke to the park's earliest explanations, only highlighted by the Man in Black’s revelations about the world beyond the park's borders, where human society is theoretically experiencing a golden age of plenty, but without real drive." She gave the episode an A−. James Hibberd of Entertainment Weekly wrote in his review, "The writers of Westworld are no longer holding our hands with this stuff and just assume we're keeping up.". He gave the episode a B+. Catherine Gee of The Daily Telegraph wrote in her review, "The plot became ever thicker, and twistier, in the fifth instalment of HBO's newest big hitting drama." David Crow of Den of Geek said in his review, "Tonight's trip into Ford and Arnold's gunslinging paradise was the most astonishing episode of Westworld to date." He gave the episode a perfect score. Erik Kain of Forbes also reviewed the episode, saying, "All told, another great episode with so much to chew over it's an honest-to-god challenge writing about. There are few shows with so many moving pieces and so much obscuring fog to peer through."
