= Dissonance Theory =

- Westworld episode
- Episode no.: Season 1 Episode 4
- Directed by: Vincenzo Natali
- Written by: Ed Brubaker; Jonathan Nolan
- Cinematography by: Brendan Galvin
- Editing by: Tanya Swerling
- Production code: 4X6154
- Original air date: October 23, 2016
- Running time: 59 minutes

Guest appearances
- Chris Browning as Holden; Demetrius Grosse as Deputy Foss; James Landry Hébert as Slim Miller; Sherman Augustus as Marshal Pruitt

Episode chronology
← Previous "The Stray"	Next → "Contrapasso"

"Dissonance Theory" is the fourth episode in the first season of the HBO science fiction western thriller television series Westworld. The episode aired on October 23, 2016.

The episode received positive reviews from critics, and in particular to Thandie Newton's performance in the last scene.

== Plot summary ==
Bernard interviews Dolores in Operations about her family's murder. While she experiences pain from it, she does not wish it to go away as it is the only memory of her family, and reminds her something is wrong with the world. Bernard suggests she find the center of the maze to become free.

Dolores wakes in Logan and William's camp. Too far into their bounty hunt to return her to Sweetwater, they continue to hunt down Slim Miller. Passing through Lawrence's village, Dolores has a vision of his daughter, telling her to find the maze. On tracking down Slim, Slim says his boss will double their reward, which Logan recognizes as a rare narrative opportunity and takes it.

The Man in Black and Lawrence find Hector's henchwoman, Armistice, bathing in a river. Seeing a snake tattoo on her body, they recognize her as the next clue, and introduce themselves. Armistice offers to give more information on her tattoo if they help free Hector, held by the local sheriff. The Man goes alone to rescue Hector, and on return, Armistice reveals the tattoo represents the men she had killed in revenge for killing her mother, the only man missing being Wyatt. The Man and Lawrence take their leave. As they continue, they find Teddy tied up. The Man releases him, saying that "misery is all [he] has".

Theresa learns of the stray host and demands the QA department oversee debugging the hosts. She goes to see Dr. Ford, who is overseeing a new excavation on site, to express her concerns about his narrative. He reminds her that her position is easily replaced and knows of her affair with Bernard. He also informs her that his activities have all been approved by the park's board.

Maeve, back in the park, has visions of the people she saw in Operations. She realizes it is similar to figures she had drawn before as well as dolls carried by the children of the native tribes. She waits for Hector's gang to rob the saloon's safe to ask him about the figures and he tells her it is a Shade, a spirit that can cross back and forth to the underworld. Maeve recalls the massacre the day before and purposely stabs her unblemished stomach to pull out a bullet. She passionately kisses Hector as marshalls surround the building.

== Production ==
"Dissonance Theory" was written by Ed Brubaker and series co-creator Jonathan Nolan.

=== Filming ===
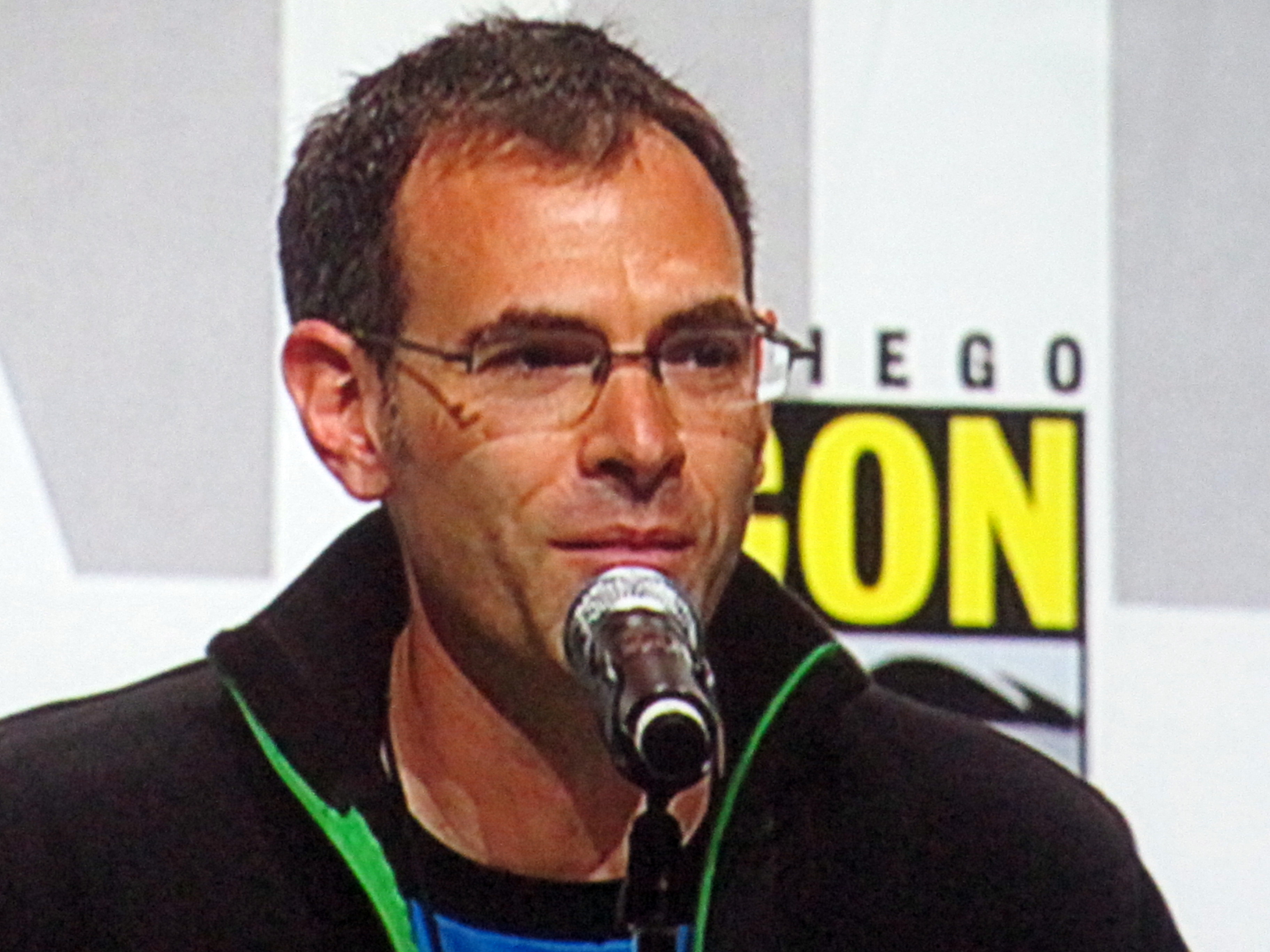
Vincenzo Natali directed the episode, his first of the series.

The episode was directed by Vincenzo Natali. In the desert excavation scene with Theresa and Ford, a Bagger 293 bucket-wheel excavator was used. It is the biggest landbound machine of all time.

According to Anthony Hopkins, his favorite scene to shoot in the entire season was the scene in this episode where Ford reveals the extent of his control over Westworld to Theresa. That scene was filmed at Hummingbird Nest Ranch, near Simi Valley, California.

=== Music ===
In an interview, composer Ramin Djawadi spoke about the song "A Forest" by The Cure, that was translated into the playing piano in the episode. He said, "It really came down to figuring out the left-hand accompaniment, the harmonies, and then playing the melody with the right hand". Djawadi continued on why that particular song was played in that situation, saying, "One, it could be somebody going, ‘I really want to listen to this song, even if the guests don’t recognize it.' Selfish programming, Or is there a deeper meaning, with the title, the lyrics?".

Georges Bizet's "Habanera" is also featured in the episode.

== Reception ==
=== Ratings ===
"Dissonance Theory" was viewed by 1.70 million American households on its initial viewing. The episode also acquired a 0.7 rating in the 18–49 demographic. Ratings for the episode fell nineteen percent compared to the previous instalment due to the season premiere of The Walking Dead. In the United Kingdom, the episode was seen by 1.09 million viewers on Sky Atlantic.

=== Critical reception ===
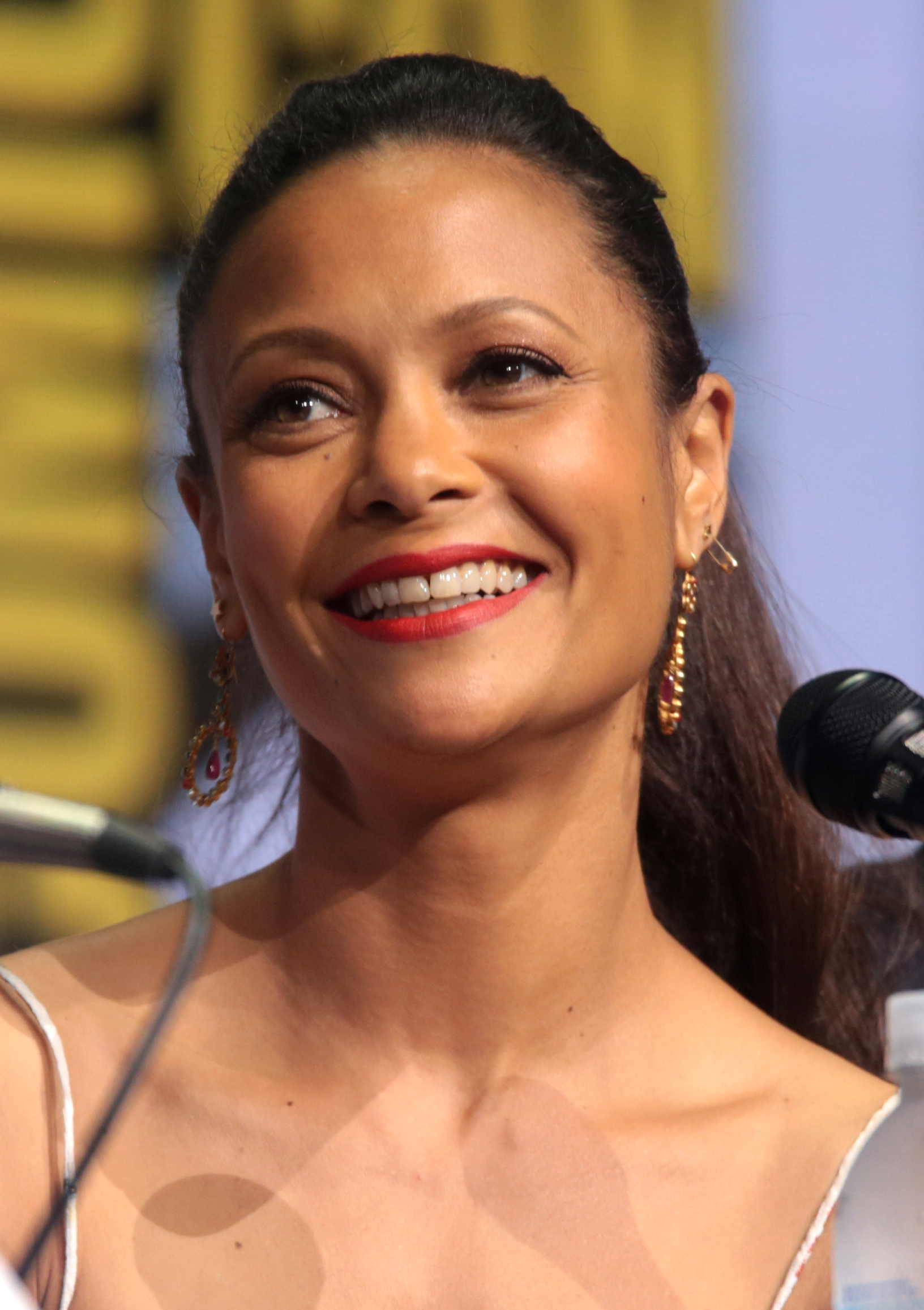
Thandiwe Newton received praise for her performance as Maeve.

"Dissonance Theory" received positive reviews from critics. The episode currently has a 95% score on Rotten Tomatoes and has an average rating of 8.5 out of 10, based on 19 reviews. The site's consensus reads "Dissonance Theory spends some welcome time with the Man In Black while continuing the methodical expansion of the Westworld universe."

Eric Goldman of IGN reviewed the episode positively, saying, "A ton was going on in 'Dissonance Theory' — as Ford displayed a different side, Hector and Armistice (and that tattoo of hers) were put in the spotlight, Dolores set on her own path towards the maze and Maeve began to literally dig deep for answers." He gave it a score of 8.7 out of 10. Scott Tobias of The New York Times wrote in his review of the episode; "Evan Rachel Wood's performance continues to astonish. In the opening scene alone, she has to make Dolores distraught yet calculating, both human and synthetic. Dolores cries over losing everyone she cares about, but when Bernard tells her to limit her 'emotional affect,' she not only becomes a machine again, we have to wonder how genuine her emotions are in the first place. Wood makes us question how real Dolores is." Zack Handlen of The A.V. Club wrote in his review, "'Dissonance Theory' doubles down on the confusion in many respects, offering some tantalizing hints about Ford's plans without actually explaining them, showing Dolores slipping a little further down the rabbit hole, and catching up with the Man in Black as he hunts down his mysterious maze. The maze also turns up in Dolores's memory, and in the drawing of a little girl on the street, so even if we don't have any immediate answers on it, at least there’s a sense of things getting tied together." He gave the episode a B+.

Liz Shannon Miller of IndieWire wrote in her review, "Westworld is in large part a show about people in search of answers, and 'Dissonance Theory' found the show’s characters taking a multitude of intriguing approaches to finding them. It's a quest-driven installment, but one that draws out some significant new information, from The Man in Black searching for a lost narrative 'with real stakes, real violence' to Maeve trying to identify the masked figures who haunt her memories." She gave the episode an A−. James Hibberd of Entertainment Weekly wrote in his review, "Westworld is almost mathematical in its narrative precision. The pace is not fast, and that frustrates some viewers. Yet the story is always moving — unceasing, purposeful, and incremental.". He gave the episode an A−.
