= The Stray (Westworld) =

- Westworld episode
- Episode no.: Season 1 Episode 3
- Directed by: Neil Marshall
- Written by: Daniel T. Thomsen; Lisa Joy
- Cinematography by: Robert McLachlan
- Editing by: Andrew Seklir
- Production code: 4X6153
- Original air date: October 16, 2016
- Running time: 59 minutes

Guest appearances
- Louis Herthum as Old Peter Abernathy; Bradford Tatum as New Peter Abernathy; Steven Ogg as Rebus; Bojana Novakovic as Marti; Talulah Riley as Angela; Gina Torres as Lauren; Brian Howe as Sheriff Picket; Demetrius Grosse as Deputy Foss; Eddie Shin as Henry; Chris Browning as Holden

Episode chronology
← Previous "Chestnut"	Next → "Dissonance Theory"

"The Stray" is the third episode in the first season of the HBO science fiction western thriller television series Westworld. The episode aired on October 16, 2016.

The episode received positive reviews from critics.

== Plot summary ==
Teddy arrives in Sweetwater and encounters Dolores who has had visions of the Man in Black and asks Teddy to teach her to shoot. Though Teddy helps, Dolores finds she cannot pull the trigger, unaware her programming prevents this.

Teddy's programming is updated by Dr. Ford to seek out and kill his old Union army sergeant Wyatt, now the leader of a cult that terrorizes the countryside. Teddy joins with a posse of hosts and guests to seek out the cult, but they are ambushed; the posse hosts are killed and the guests flee, and Teddy, trying to defend himself, finds that his bullets have no effect on the cult members and is mobbed.

Bernard brings concerns raised by Theresa and Elsie to Dr. Ford about his seemingly unilateral updates to the hosts, Walter's rampage against hosts that had killed him in previous narratives, and a conversation Walter had with a man named Arnold. Ford explains that Arnold was a co-founder of the park who wanted to create true consciousness in the hosts, but died in the park due to an accident. Bernard is reminded of the loss of his own son Charlie and wife Lauren. When he brings Dolores into Mesa for a checkup, he gives her a copy of "Alice in Wonderland" to read, Charlie's favorite story. Bernard asks Dolores if, given the choice, she would question her own existence or stay safe, and she replies she would want to be free. Bernard clears Dolores to be returned to the park but does not report this answer.

Elsie and Ashley track down a stray host in the park, finding he had carved constellations in rocks despite not having been programmed with that knowledge. When they locate him in a ravine and try to free him, the host grabs a rock and smashes his own head in.

Dolores returns home to find her father killed by Rebus and bandits. Rebus grabs her and drags her to the barn and attempts to rape her. Dolores has further visions of the Man in Black, and is able to steal Rebus's gun and kills him. She flees from her home.

William saves Clementine by killing an outlaw. Emboldened, he takes a bounty hunt narrative, and Logan reluctantly joins him. At camp that night, a frantic Dolores runs into their camp and collapses.

== Production ==
"The Stray" was written by Daniel T. Thomsen and series co-creator Lisa Joy.

=== Filming ===
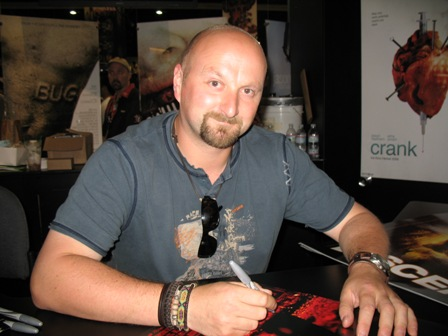
Neil Marshall directed the episode, his first of the series.

The episode was directed by Neil Marshall. In the episode, Anthony Hopkins' character Dr. Robert Ford was depicted as a younger version of himself. For this to be done, effects supervisor Jay Worth collaborated with ILP, a Stockholm-based VFX studio. References were pulled from Hopkins' early acting career, when he was in his 30s and 40s.

The scenes in which Elsie and Ashley track down a stray host who then self-destructs were filmed at Corriganville Park in Simi Valley, California.

=== Music ===
In an interview, composer Ramin Djawadi spoke about the hosts playing piano in the episode instead of the humans. He said, "It's got a robotic harshness to it which is very distinctive. When a human plays it, the dynamics are modified. But when the player piano hits a note, it's always the same." Djawadi continued on why Dr Ford would keep a host in his office, saying, "Maybe to keep him company! — And it shows his control, as well. This is his world. He created everything. So he can have as many hosts around him as he wants. I would pick a human, though. There's something about the human performance that a robot could never get close to." The episode featured the classical piece "Reverie L.68", by French composer Claude Debussy and "Peacherine Rag" by composer and pianist Scott Joplin, which was played in the player piano by a host in the episode.

== Reception ==
=== Ratings ===
"The Stray" was viewed by 2.10 million American households on its initial viewing becoming the most watched episode of the show so far. The episode also acquired a 0.9 rating in the 18–49 demographic. In the United Kingdom, the episode was seen by 1.21 million viewers on Sky Atlantic.

=== Critical reception ===
"The Stray" received positive reviews from critics. The episode currently has a 96% score on Rotten Tomatoes and has an average rating of 8.6 out of 10, based on 25 reviews. The site's consensus reads "The Stray furthers character evolution while providing juicy backstory and twisty plot progression."

Eric Goldman of IGN reviewed the episode positively, saying, "Westworld's third episode put a bigger spotlight on how different Ford and Bernard's attitudes are about the hosts. While Bernard's feelings of love and loss for his dead son transferring over to Dolores aren't subtle, they make sense, and Jeffrey Wright is, predictably, perfect at showing how he cares for her, even as he knows he's going down a road he probably shouldn't." He gave it a score of 8.2 out of 10. Scott Tobias of The New York Times wrote in his review of the episode; "The slight hiccups in Dolores' routine are beautifully handled here. By now, we've seen the shot of her finding the wandering cattle on the ranch and saying 'Father wouldn't let 'em roam this close to dark' several times. But here, there's a slight pause between 'close' and 'to,' because Dolores is struck by an acute feeling of déjà vu. When it strikes her again in a confrontation with her parents' attackers, she recognizes the loops well enough to slip her grim fate and head for the hills." Zack Handlen of The A.V. Club wrote in his review, "'The Stray' offers some potentially intriguing set-up, but that set-up isn't worth much if it doesn't go anywhere worthwhile. We'll just have to wait and see." He gave the episode a B+.

Liz Shannon Miller of IndieWire wrote in her review, "The last 20 or so minutes of 'The Stray', in general, are probably the most violent and grotesque of the show to date—between the battle with Wyatt's marauders, the Stray bashing his own brains in and Dolores shooting Rebus dead after an attempted rape. Even for the most inured, there's still some shock value. There's also, frankly, more drag than in the previous two weeks, thanks to some exposition dumps that do bring a new level of enlightenment to the show, but don't move as briskly as they might." She gave the episode a B. Erik Kain of Forbes also reviewed the episode, saying, "All told, a terrific episode that ramped up the crazy factor and the mystery to new heights. HBO is on to something here in a very big way. Westworld is brilliant, mysterious and captivating."
