= Albedo One =

Irish speculative fiction magazine (1993-2020)

- Albedo One Issue 31
- Albedo One Editorial Team: John Kenny, Bob Neilson, David Murphy, Frank Ludlow, Roelof Goudriaan and Peter Loftus with Contributing Editors Dev Agarwal, Juliet E. McKenna and David Conyers.
- Categories: Horror, fantasy, science fiction (cross-genre and unclassifiable)
- Frequency: Biannual or Triannual
- Circulation: ~900
- Publisher: Albedo One Productions
- Founded: 1993
- Country: Ireland
- Based in: Dublin
- Language: English
- Website: www.albedo1.com
- ISSN: 0791-8534

Albedo One was an Irish horror, fantasy and science fiction magazine founded in 1993 and published by Albedo One Productions.

== Overview ==
Albedo One was widely regarded as the successor to the Irish science fiction magazine FTL, which was originally published by the (also now-defunct) Irish Science Fiction Association. FTL was itself a successor of the Irish magazine Gateway. Albedo One is often credited as holding the position of the "longest running Irish magazine of speculative fiction" and has been billed as "Ireland's answer to Interzone." From issue 1, 1993, to issue 12, 1996, Albedo One was published by Tachyon Productions and was in an A5 size format. From issue 13, 1996, the magazine moved to a larger A4 format and was published by Albedo One Productions. The move to new publisher and format was motivated, according to the editors, "in an effort to gain better distribution, more advertising and put a little jizz into the magazine.".

Albedo One published original (i.e. previously unpublished) stories from Irish, European and International authors. Its focus on Irish authors was often noted by reviewers, but publication of non-Irish authors was not excluded as with some national genre magazines, and the magazine was "primarily interested in good writing". The magazine stated that its "definition of what constitutes SF, horror and fantasy is extremely broad" and that it liked "to see material which pushes at the boundaries", a fact that was remarked upon by readers and reviewers. In this respect, one reviewer stated that "Any magazine that encourages both new writers and readers to range more widely, deserves encouragement."

The magazine appeared in print and electronic pdf format approximately two to three times per year. Stories published in each issue generally ranged from 2000 to 8000 words in length, though in practise published stories sometimes fell outside these lengths. The magazine also published in each issue an interview with a well-known genre author, in addition to book reviews and a (recently sporadic) letters column under the heading "Ugly Chickens" after the famous story "The Ugly Chickens" by genre author Howard Waldrop. The editors of the magazine stated that aside from the fiction, they felt that non-fiction content "lends a magazine its identity."

The magazine also featured an irregular article or opinion piece by anonymous authors writing under the name of Severian, after a character made famous in the writing of genre author Gene Wolfe. These columns were often noted for their "opinionated" or controversial stance on genre matters, with that in issue 31 of Albedo One being described as "a deliberately provocative rant" by one reviewer. In 1996 the editors offered an open invitation, stating that "If you feel strongly about anything and want to let us and the readers know, you too can don the mightly mantle of Severian."

== Staff ==
- John Kenny, co-editor
- Peter Loftus, co-editor
- Frank Ludlow, co-editor
- David Murphy, co-editor
- Robert Neilson, co-editor

== Industry attention and awards ==
Between 1997 and 1999 Albedo One was honored three times by the European Science Fiction Society, winning Awards for "Best Magazine" and "Best Publisher".

Stories from the magazine often earned Honorable Mentions in the Year's Best Science Fiction edited by Gardner Dozois and the Year's Best Fantasy and Horror edited by Ellen Datlow, Kelly Link and Gavin Grant.

Despite this, it was only relatively recently that stories from the magazine were reprinted in the Year's Best volumes, with "The Bad Magician" by Philip Raines and Harvey Welles (from Albedo One issue 28) reprinted in volume 18 of the Year's Best Fantasy and Horror 2004 and "I Hold My Father's Paws" (from issue 31) by David D. Levine reprinted in volume 24 of the Year's Best Science Fiction 2006.

Albedo One was voted 8th in the nominations for the Hugo Award under the "Best Semiprozine" category for 2006. Although only the top five in the list were deemed to have earned a nomination for the Hugo Award under this category, the event was notable as being the first time Albedo One had a presence on the nominations list (and the first time an Irish genre magazine had a presence). The event was also notable in that Albedo One was placed ahead of other well-known magazines such as Lady Churchill's Rosebud Wristlet, Postscripts and Apex Digest.

== Critical reception ==
=== Production values ===
The Mammoth Encyclopedia of Science Fiction, noted that "Recent issues have boasted a printed cover, but the magazine still contains a black-and-white photocopied interior" and could "from the purely aesthetic point of view, benefit from some enhanced production values". The entry continues to note that "the editorial and literary quality of the contents more than makes up for this".

However, Mann's inclusion of some genre magazines like Albedo One as opposed to other available magazines earned some criticism from reviewers, with one reviewer from the online edition of The Zone commenting that "Ireland's Albedo One rates a plug... But where are comparable titles like Tony Lee's The Zone, Chris Reed's ever-stylish Back Brain Recluse, or the unforgettable Critical Wave?"

One reviewer commented of issue 25, 2002, that "It has a certain charming loopiness of type design and layout reminiscent of Pagemaker output from the early 1990s, but the stories certainly are strong." Regarding production values, in 2003, one editor of the magazine remarked "We would love to produce a fully printed magazine with a full colour cover but, unlike the situation in the UK, our Arts Council does not feel that either science fiction or magazine publishing are worthy enough to be considered for support."

However, in a possible response to criticism, the magazine attempted to increase its production values, with full colour covers, in a perfect-bound A4 format and DocuTech printed greyscale interior, from issue 28 (2004) onwards. At the time, the editors commented that "When we started we never dreamed we would still be around in the New Millenium [sic]. But, our philosophy was that we would keep doing it as long as it was fun and it still is. We hope you like the full colour cover."

=== Fiction content ===
Reviews of the fiction content of Albedo One generally ranged from largely positive to very positive. One reviewer stated that "if you're flatulently full with the fluffer shorts of pedestrian writers going through the motions, a dose of Albedo One #29 is the perfect antidote." The same reviewer stated of issue 32 that "Albedo One's inexorable rise to the top gains momentum with this issue's expertly assembled and fluid mix of speculative fiction."

A review of issue 33 on BestSF stated of the magazine that "It's not quite up to kicking Interzone's arse, but as the redoubtable English mag takes strides forward under its new leadership, Albedo One is keeping up with the pace and is at least in sight of those coat tails, if not in grabbing distance." A review of issue 34, stated that "Albedo One prides itself on distinctive fiction and as previously stated, in this department it delivers."

However, not all reviews were this positive, though stopped short of being explicitly negative. Issue 30 received a relatively neutral review on BestSF, while commenting on issue 33, a reviewer stated that "With the ripples from the splash caused by last issue's impact still lapping at my brain, the still waters of Albedo One #33 signal a return to – if not more settled, then less startling – genre fiction, well-crafted and likeable, but a little stagnant all the same.".

In 2003, one editor stated that "We're striving to improve with every issue and critics have said some very nice things about us over the years, as well as some bad. Personally, I have always felt it preferable if a story elicits strong reactions - either negative or positive - than for it to get a lukewarm response all round. At least a story that people hate has affected them enough to stir an emotion... I don't think we've ever published a story nobody disliked and I doubt (hope) we ever will."

The overall approach to selection of fiction for publication in Albedo One was commended by one reviewer by stating that "while other publishers strain to adhere to self-imposed deadlines, Albedo One embraces a publishing schedule dictated by its gradual accumulation of quality material - material that mixes first time writers with established professionals, and that demands an audience."

== The Aeon Award ==
Since 2004 Albedo One had sponsored the Aeon Award, a fiction contest aimed at promoting new writers and writing in the speculative fiction genres. The story "My Marriage" by English author Julian West won the Inaugural 2004-2005 Aeon Award with Grand Judge Ian Watson commenting that he found it "rather unsettling", recommending it for the gender bending Lambda Award.

== Aeon Press ==
Aeon Press was described as the "book-publishing" arm of Albedo One, and was one of Ireland's few dedicated publishers of science fiction, fantasy and horror.

Its most notable release was Emerald Eye: Best Irish Imaginative Fiction (2005) edited by Roelof Goudriaan and Frank Ludlow

That collection comprised science fiction, fantasy and horror from modern Irish authors. Its dark tone lacked typical Irish fantasy elements (e.g. leprechauns), and as such was considered by some to be controversial. One review generated a relatively long debate concerning the nature of "Irish" fantasy, "Irishness" and the art of reviewing.

In 2011 Aeon Press released two short story anthologies at Bristolcon (UK) and Octocon (Ire).

"Box of Delights", edited by John Kenny features 16 spine-chilling tales of love and death from such authors as Mike Resnick, Kristine Kathryn Rusch, Steve Rasnic Tem, Don D'Ammassa and Priya Sharma.

"Transtories" edited by Colin Harvey is an anthology of stories taking the prefix 'trans'. Notable authors include Aliette de Boddard, Jay Caselberg and Lawrence M. Schoen.

== Format and availability ==
Issues appeared two or three times a year both as a PDF download and as an A4 size print magazine. Sample content from certain issues were also available to view on the Albedo One website and were periodically updated.
