= List of Westworld episodes =

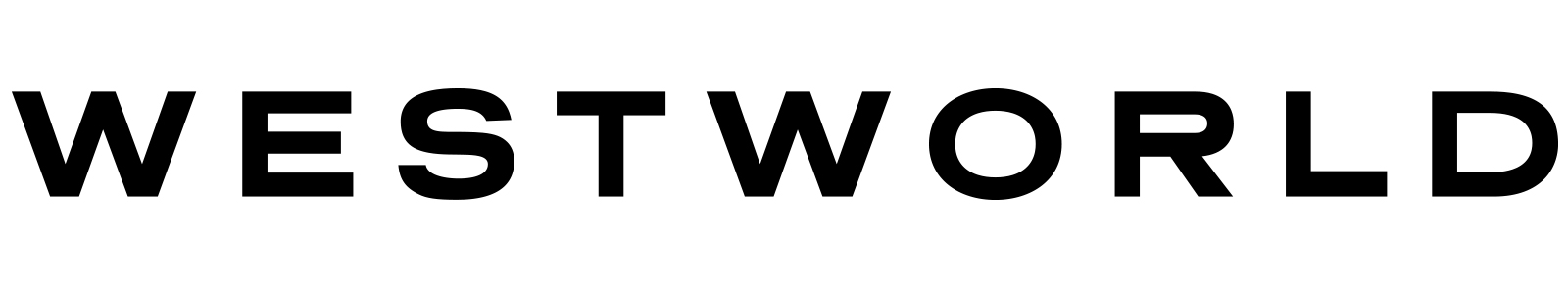

Westworld is an American dystopian science fiction, neo-Western television series, based on the 1973 film of the same name by Michael Crichton. The series was created by Jonathan Nolan and Lisa Joy and premiered on HBO on October 2, 2016. The story begins in Westworld, a fictional, technologically advanced Wild West-themed amusement park populated by android "hosts". The park caters to high-paying guests who may indulge their wildest fantasies within the park without fear of retaliation from the hosts, who are prevented by their programming from harming humans. Later on, in the third season, the series' setting expands to the real world, in the mid-21st century, where people's lives are driven and controlled by a powerful artificial intelligence named Rehoboam.

In November 2022, HBO canceled the series. During the course of the series, 36 episodes of Westworld aired over four seasons, between October 2, 2016, and August 14, 2022.

== Series overview ==
Season	Title	Episodes	Originally released		Average viewership (in millions)
Season	Title	Episodes	First released	Last released	Average viewership (in millions)
1	The Maze	10	October 2, 2016	December 4, 2016	1.8
2	The Door	10	April 22, 2018	June 24, 2018	1.6
3	The New World	8	March 15, 2020	May 3, 2020	0.8
4	The Choice	8	June 26, 2022	August 14, 2022	0.3

== Episodes ==
=== Season 1: The Maze (2016) ===
No. overall	No. in season	Title	Directed by	Written by	Original release date	Prod. code	U.S. viewers (millions)
1	1	"The Original"	Jonathan Nolan	Story by : Jonathan Nolan & Lisa Joy and Michael Crichton; Teleplay by : Jonathan Nolan & Lisa Joy	October 2, 2016	276083	1.96
2	2	"Chestnut"	Richard J. Lewis	Jonathan Nolan & Lisa Joy	October 9, 2016 (Note: The second episode was released online on HBO's streaming service on October 7, and released on normal broadcast television on October 9, 2016. Commentators speculated it was due to Sunday's timeslot conflicting with the second Clinton–Trump presidential debate.)	4X6152	1.50
3	3	"The Stray"	Neil Marshall	Daniel T. Thomsen & Lisa Joy	October 16, 2016	4X6153	2.10
4	4	"Dissonance Theory"	Vincenzo Natali	Ed Brubaker & Jonathan Nolan	October 23, 2016	4X6154	1.70
5	5	"Contrapasso"	Jonny Campbell	Story by : Dominic Mitchell & Lisa Joy; Teleplay by : Lisa Joy	October 30, 2016	4X6155	1.49
6	6	"The Adversary"	Frederick E.O. Toye	Halley Gross & Jonathan Nolan	November 6, 2016	4X6156	1.64
7	7	"Trompe L'Oeil"	Frederick E.O. Toye	Halley Gross & Jonathan Nolan	November 13, 2016	4X6157	1.75
8	8	"Trace Decay"	Stephen Williams	Charles Yu & Lisa Joy	November 20, 2016	4X6158	1.78
9	9	"The Well-Tempered Clavier"	Michelle MacLaren	Dan Dietz & Katherine Lingenfelter	November 27, 2016	4X6159	2.09
10	10	"The Bicameral Mind"	Jonathan Nolan	Lisa Joy & Jonathan Nolan	December 4, 2016	4X6160	2.24

=== Season 2: The Door (2018) ===
No. overall	No. in season	Title	Directed by	Written by	Original release date	Prod. code	U.S. viewers (millions)
11	1	"Journey into Night"	Richard J. Lewis	Lisa Joy & Roberto Patino	April 22, 2018	201	2.06
12	2	"Reunion"	Vincenzo Natali	Carly Wray & Jonathan Nolan	April 29, 2018	202	1.85
13	3	"Virtù e Fortuna"	Richard J. Lewis	Roberto Patino & Ron Fitzgerald	May 6, 2018	203	1.63
14	4	"The Riddle of the Sphinx"	Lisa Joy	Gina Atwater & Jonathan Nolan	May 13, 2018	204	1.59
15	5	"Akane no Mai"	Craig Zobel	Dan Dietz	May 20, 2018	205	1.55
16	6	"Phase Space"	Tarik Saleh	Carly Wray	May 27, 2018	206	1.11
17	7	"Les Écorchés"	Nicole Kassell	Jordan Goldberg & Ron Fitzgerald	June 3, 2018	207	1.39
18	8	"Kiksuya"	Uta Briesewitz	Carly Wray & Dan Dietz	June 10, 2018	208	1.44
19	9	"Vanishing Point"	Stephen Williams	Roberto Patino	June 17, 2018	209	1.56
20	10	"The Passenger"	Frederick E.O. Toye	Jonathan Nolan & Lisa Joy	June 24, 2018	210	1.56

=== Season 3: The New World (2020) ===
No. overall	No. in season	Title	Directed by	Written by	Original release date	Prod. code	U.S. viewers (millions)
21	1	"Parce Domine"	Jonathan Nolan	Lisa Joy & Jonathan Nolan	March 15, 2020	301	0.901
22	2	"The Winter Line"	Richard J. Lewis	Matthew Pitts & Lisa Joy	March 22, 2020	302	0.778
23	3	"The Absence of Field"	Amanda Marsalis	Denise Thé	March 29, 2020	303	0.801
24	4	"The Mother of Exiles"	Paul Cameron	Jordan Goldberg & Lisa Joy	April 5, 2020	304	0.779
25	5	"Genre"	Anna Foerster	Karrie Crouse & Jonathan Nolan	April 12, 2020	305	0.766
26	6	"Decoherence"	Jennifer Getzinger	Suzanne Wrubel & Lisa Joy	April 19, 2020	306	0.771
27	7	"Passed Pawn"	Helen Shaver	Gina Atwater	April 26, 2020	307	0.813
28	8	"Crisis Theory"	Jennifer Getzinger	Denise Thé & Jonathan Nolan	May 3, 2020	308	0.888

=== Season 4: The Choice (2022) ===
No. overall	No. in season	Title	Directed by	Written by	Original release date	Prod. code	U.S. viewers (millions)
29	1	"The Auguries"	Richard J. Lewis	Lisa Joy & Will Soodik	June 26, 2022	401	0.325
30	2	"Well Enough Alone"	Craig William Macneill	Matthew Pitts & Christina Ham	July 3, 2022	402	0.350
31	3	"Années Folles"	Hanelle M. Culpepper	Kevin Lau & Suzanne Wrubel	July 10, 2022	403	0.312
32	4	"Generation Loss"	Paul Cameron	Kevin Lau & Suzanne Wrubel	July 17, 2022	404	0.312
33	5	"Zhuangzi"	Craig William Macneill	Wes Humphrey & Lisa Joy	July 24, 2022	405	0.384
34	6	"Fidelity"	Andrew Seklir	Jordan Goldberg & Alli Rock	July 31, 2022	406	0.394
35	7	"Metanoia"	Meera Menon	Desa Larkin-Boutte & Denise Thé	August 7, 2022	407	0.321
36	8	"Que Será, Será"	Richard J. Lewis	Alison Schapker & Jonathan Nolan	August 14, 2022	408	0.391
