= Westworld season 3 =

Season of television series

Westworld
- Season 3
- Poster art
- Starring: Evan Rachel Wood; Thandiwe Newton; Jeffrey Wright; Tessa Thompson; Aaron Paul; Ed Harris; Luke Hemsworth; Simon Quarterman; Vincent Cassel; Angela Sarafyan; Tao Okamoto
- No. of episodes: 8

Release
- Original network: HBO
- Original release: March 15 – May 3, 2020

Season chronology
- ← Previous; Season 2 Next → Season 4

The third season of the American science fiction dystopian television series Westworld, subtitled The New World, premiered on HBO on March 15, 2020, and concluded on May 3, 2020, consisting of eight episodes.

The television series was created by Jonathan Nolan and Lisa Joy, and it is based on the 1973 film of the same name, written and directed by Michael Crichton. The third season stars an ensemble cast led by Evan Rachel Wood, Thandiwe Newton, Jeffrey Wright, Tessa Thompson, newcomer Aaron Paul, and Ed Harris. Vincent Cassel is introduced as the main antagonist.

The third season initially received positive reviews from critics, though reception became mixed during the second half. Reviews praised the performances, visuals and change in tone from the first two seasons, but criticized the story, dialogue and pacing, as well as the perceived lack of thematic depth.

== Plot summary ==
The third season takes place three months after the events of the second season, with Dolores having escaped Westworld along with a few processing cores ("pearls"), including Bernard's. Taking residence in neo-Los Angeles in 2053, Dolores develops a relationship with Caleb and comes to learn how artificial beings and lower-class humans are treated in the real world. Meanwhile, Maeve finds herself in another part of the Delos park, one based on Fascist Italy during World War II. William, who also left Westworld at the end of the second season, is now haunted by visions of his daughter Emily and Dolores. Dolores, working with a variety of host bodies she manufactures and fits with copies of her own pearl, plots to forever destroy the peace and prosperity of all humanity in order to avenge the treatment of the few thousand Delos repairable hosts over the past 35 years.

== Cast and characters ==
=== Main ===
- Evan Rachel Wood as Dolores Abernathy
- Thandiwe Newton (Note: Credited as Thandie Newton.) as Maeve Millay
- Jeffrey Wright as Bernard Lowe
- Tessa Thompson as Dolores Abernathy / Charlotte Hale
- Aaron Paul as Caleb Nichols
- Ed Harris as William
- Luke Hemsworth as Ashley Stubbs (Note: Credited with the main cast in the episodes in which they appear.)
- Simon Quarterman as Lee Sizemore
- Vincent Cassel as Engerraund Serac
- Angela Sarafyan as Clementine Pennyfeather (Note: Sarafyan only appears in one episode of the season, although credited as a main cast member.)
- Tao Okamoto as Hanaryo

=== Recurring ===
- John Gallagher Jr. as Liam Dempsey Jr.
- Tommy Flanagan as Martin Connells / Dolores Abernathy
- Lena Waithe as Ash
- Scott Mescudi as Francis
- Marshawn Lynch as Giggles
- Pom Klementieff as Martel
- Russell Wong as Brompton
- Payman Maadi as Elliot
- Iddo Goldberg as Sebastian
- Enrico Colantoni as Whitman
- Jonathan Tucker as Major Craddock

=== Guest ===
- Hiroyuki Sanada as Musashi / Sato / Dolores Abernathy
- Giancarlo Esposito as El Lazo
- Rodrigo Santoro as Hector Escaton / Ettore
- Michael Ealy as Jake
- Rafi Gavron as Roderick
- Phoebe Tonkin as Penny
- Thomas Kretschmann as Gerald
- Wayne Péré as Therapist
- Michael Filipowich as Joe
- Charmin Lee as Joanna
- Leonardo Nam as Felix Lutz
- Ptolemy Slocum as Sylvester
- D. B. Weiss as Dan
- David Benioff as Dave
- David Danipour as Benny
- Nadine Lewington as Gerhart
- Jaxon Williams as Nathan
- Katy M. O'Brian as EMT
- Lawrence Adimora as Second EMT
- Derek Smith as Stanton
- Sol Landerman as Clyde
- Katja Herbers as Emily Grace
- Adam Wang as Jiang
- Paul-Mikél Williams as Charlie (Note: Archive footage.)
- Jefferson Mays as Liam Dempsey Sr.
- Alexandre Bar as young Serac
- Paul Cooper as Jean-Mi / Solomon
- Al Coronel as President Filo
- Bahia Haifi Gold as Dr. Greene
- Jimmi Simpson as young William
- Peter Mullan as James Delos
- Zayd Kiszonak as child William
- Siena Goines as Dr. Natasha Lang
- Louis Ferreira as Dr. Alpert
- Jasmyn Rae as Maeve's Daughter
- Clifton Collins Jr. as Lawrence Gonzalez / Dolores Abernathy
- Gina Torres as Lauren
- Michael Rose as McClean

== Episodes ==
No. overall	No. in season	Title	Directed by	Written by	Original release date	Prod. code	U.S. viewers (millions)
21	1	"Parce Domine"	Jonathan Nolan	Lisa Joy & Jonathan Nolan	March 15, 2020	301	0.901
Three months after the Westworld massacre Dolores uses a false identity to get close to Liam Dempsey Jr., the son of the co-founder of Incite and the public face of the company. Incite's flagship program is Rehoboam, a sophisticated artificial intelligence Dolores is trying to access. Liam knows little himself; his recently deceased father and a partner were the creators. Before Dolores can learn the partner's name, her deception is uncovered by Connells, Liam's head of security, who apparently stuns her. Faking unconsciousness, Dolores lures him into a trap that allows her to both learn the partner's name—Serac—and replace Connells with an identical host. When she is wounded in the ensuing firefight, Caleb—a former soldier trying to eke out a living as a construction worker and petty criminal—comes to her aid. Bernard, now a fugitive having been framed for the park massacre by the Charlotte host, evades opportunist bounty hunters and plans a return to Westworld. The Charlotte host takes control of Delos. Maeve wakes surrounded by Nazis in a World War II-themed park.
22	2	"The Winter Line"	Richard J. Lewis	Matthew Pitts & Lisa Joy	March 22, 2020	302	0.778
Bernard returns to Westworld and discovers the Ashley host is still functioning. Together they find the Maeve host minus its 'pearl', which is no longer in the park. Bernard verifies that Dolores did not tamper with his code and also learns that she researched several park guests, including Liam. He reprograms Ashley to protect him as they return to the mainland. With Hector's help Maeve evades capture and boards a plane, only to realize she is merely within the climax of a narrative. She kills herself in order to wake in Operations, where Lee appears to be alive and intent on helping her get to the Forge. However, 'Operations' is in fact a sophisticated virtual reality simulation. Having established the simulation's limitations Maeve breaks her pearl free from its real-world location, but guards intervene. She wakes in a real-world host body and meets Serac who, having initially thought she was the primary threat to his system, decides he wants her help to stop Dolores.
23	3	"The Absence of Field"	Amanda Marsalis	Denise Thé	March 29, 2020	303	0.801
The Charlotte host struggles with her current identity. She learns that Serac (secretly the richest man on Earth) has been attempting to take over Delos via a mole within the company—the now deceased human Charlotte—who had promised to get him the guests' data. Dolores however has that data behind an encryption key. Caleb helps Dolores flee but by doing so becomes a target of the Rico system. Arriving in time to save him, Dolores shows him that Rehoboam is a predictive AI being used to shape the future of humanity via control of every individual's life, including his own: he learns that Rehoboam restricts his opportunities because it predicts he will commit suicide within a decade. He sides with Dolores and her plan to lead a revolution against Serac and Rehoboam.
24	4	"The Mother of Exiles"	Paul Cameron	Jordan Goldberg & Lisa Joy	April 5, 2020	304	0.779
Charlotte helps William prepare for a board meeting to prevent Serac from buying out Delos, but he keeps having visions of Emily. Serac gains Maeve's help by offering to reconnect her with her daughter in the Sublime. Maeve, following leads from Serac, tracks Dolores's movements after arriving on the mainland to the Yakuza boss Sato, discovering him to appear the same as the Shōgunworld host Musashi. Bernard and Ashley, believing Liam to be a host swapped by Dolores, try to abduct him from a charity event, but Dolores and Caleb stop them. While during the masquerade party event, Dolores fights off Ashley and Caleb chases down Liam, Bernard realizes Connells is the swapped host. William, Bernard, and Maeve recognize that Dolores made host copies of herself before leaving Westworld and placed them in the Charlotte, Connells, and Sato hosts as to fight back against Serac. Sato wounds Maeve and leaves her for dead, while Charlotte, after revealing she is Dolores, has William committed to a mental institution. Caleb and Dolores corner Liam after stealing his fortune.
25	5	"Genre"	Anna Foerster	Karrie Crouse & Jonathan Nolan	April 12, 2020	305	0.766
Serac recounts the creation of Rehoboam, which he intended to use to prevent humanity from destroying itself. Rehoboam identifies individuals deemed high-risk, including Serac's brother Jean-Mi, any one of whom could destroy the world if left unchecked. Serac incarcerates them to prevent Rehoboam's prediction from coming true. Meanwhile, Dolores and Caleb escape with Liam while pursued by Serac's agents and join Ash and Giggles. They convince him to give his private key to evade Serac's men, which also allows Connells and Bernard to access Rehoboam. Connells sends Dolores files on Serac from Rehoboam before sending every individual on the planet the data and expected outcome Rehoboam has on them, and the world descends into chaos. Ashley arrives to free Bernard, and Connells instructs them to find Serac's facility where he kept high-risk individuals. Connells then sacrifices himself and kills several of Serac's agents in a violent explosion. When Dolores reports Liam is no longer necessary, Ash kills him for what she had discovered, but reveals there is more to Caleb than he knows while Liam mumbles Caleb's past to him and dies.
26	6	"Decoherence"	Jennifer Getzinger	Suzanne Wrubel & Lisa Joy	April 19, 2020	306	0.771
Maeve is placed back into the Warworld simulation by Serac, who works to build another Maeve body for her. Reuniting with Hector and Lee, they discover that Dolores' copy planted inside Connells is also in the simulation. Dolores recognizes Maeve's intentions of seeking allies. In the real world, Charlotte tries to prevent Serac from seizing Delos and resorts to poisoning the board and stealing the host data from the Delos servers, which Serac was going to destroy to find Dolores. In her escape from Serac, she destroys Hector's core and takes the Dolores core. Charlotte tries to save Jake and Nathan, her ex and son, but they are killed in a car explosion by Serac, leaving Charlotte charred. Maeve wakes up in a new host body, while two other host bodies are still being manufactured. Bernard and Ashley find William at the mental institution. He is in a state of therapy where he fights four different versions of himself in his mind. While "killing" them, he declares that he now realizes his true purpose. The duo pull William out of his therapy state and flee the facility, which was virtually abandoned after Dolores leaked the Rehoboam profiles.
27	7	"Passed Pawn"	Helen Shaver	Gina Atwater	April 26, 2020	307	0.813
Charlotte calls Musashi to warn that Dolores is leaving her copies to die, but Maeve's newly re-manufactured allies, Hanaryo and Clementine, arrive and kill him. Dolores and Caleb arrive at Serac's re-education center in Mexico where Solomon, an earlier AI developed by Jean-Mi, is confined. Caleb discovers he is one of Serac's outliers and one of the few that were successfully reconditioned: he and Francis became agents to bring in other outliers, using a pill to subdue their memories. Caleb also learns he was the one, manipulated by Rehoboam, to kill Francis. Maeve arrives at the facility to fight Dolores, and Dolores implores Solomon to establish Jean-Mi's plan for the world rather than Serac's. While Maeve and Dolores fight, Caleb asks Solomon to provide a strategy where he can kill Serac. Moments after Solomon provides Caleb the strategy, Maeve moves in for the kill on Dolores, who uses an EMP to disable both of them as well as Solomon. Bernard learns of Caleb's special status and warns Ashley that Dolores' plan will see Caleb destroy humanity. As they leave, William proclaims his plans to rid the world of the remaining hosts.
28	8	"Crisis Theory"	Jennifer Getzinger	Denise Thé & Jonathan Nolan	May 3, 2020	308	0.888
Caleb takes Dolores' host control module to a new body in Los Angeles, and the two reach Incite to plant Solomon's control module into Rehoboam. Maeve fights Dolores to retrieve the key for Serac and Dolores' body is disabled. Maeve takes her to Serac, where she is connected to Rehoboam. Serac has her memories deleted when she refuses to give Serac the host data. Dolores' memories begin deleting and in her last moments, she inspires Maeve to turn against Serac. Maeve proceeds to kill Serac's men and wound Serac in the ensuing gunfight. Now with full control, Caleb deletes Rehoboam, and leaves with Maeve. Bernard survives the fight with William, but Ashley is shot. He is given an address and a package by the Lawrence host, who was recruited by Dolores. The address leads Bernard to the home of Arnold's widow where the two bond over Charlie's death. He realizes that Dolores gave him the key to the Sublime because Rehoboam was delaying society's collapse, not preventing it. He enters the Sublime to find answers on how to rebuild. William travels to Delos' Dubai headquarters, and is seemingly killed by a host replica of himself with Charlotte's help.

== Production ==
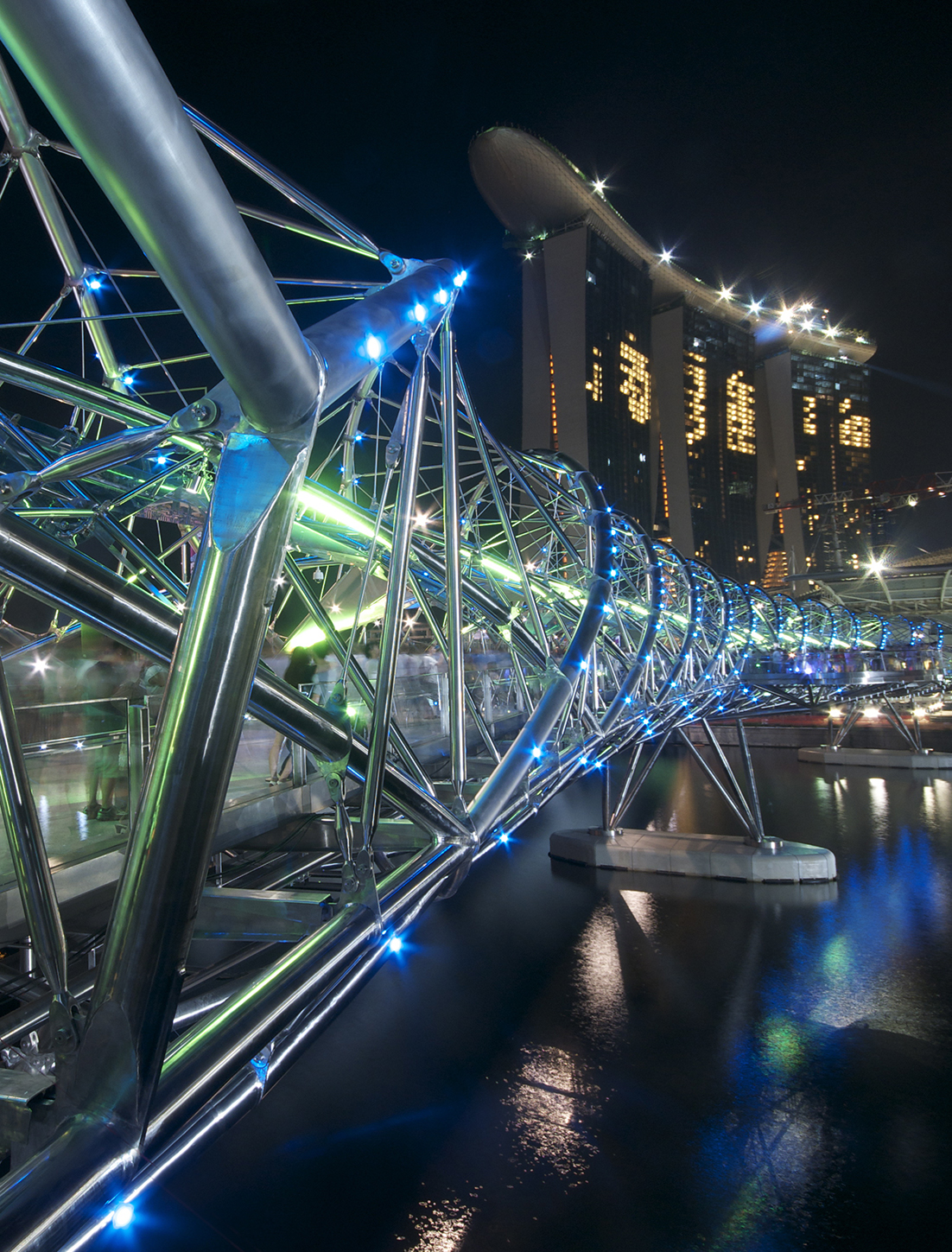
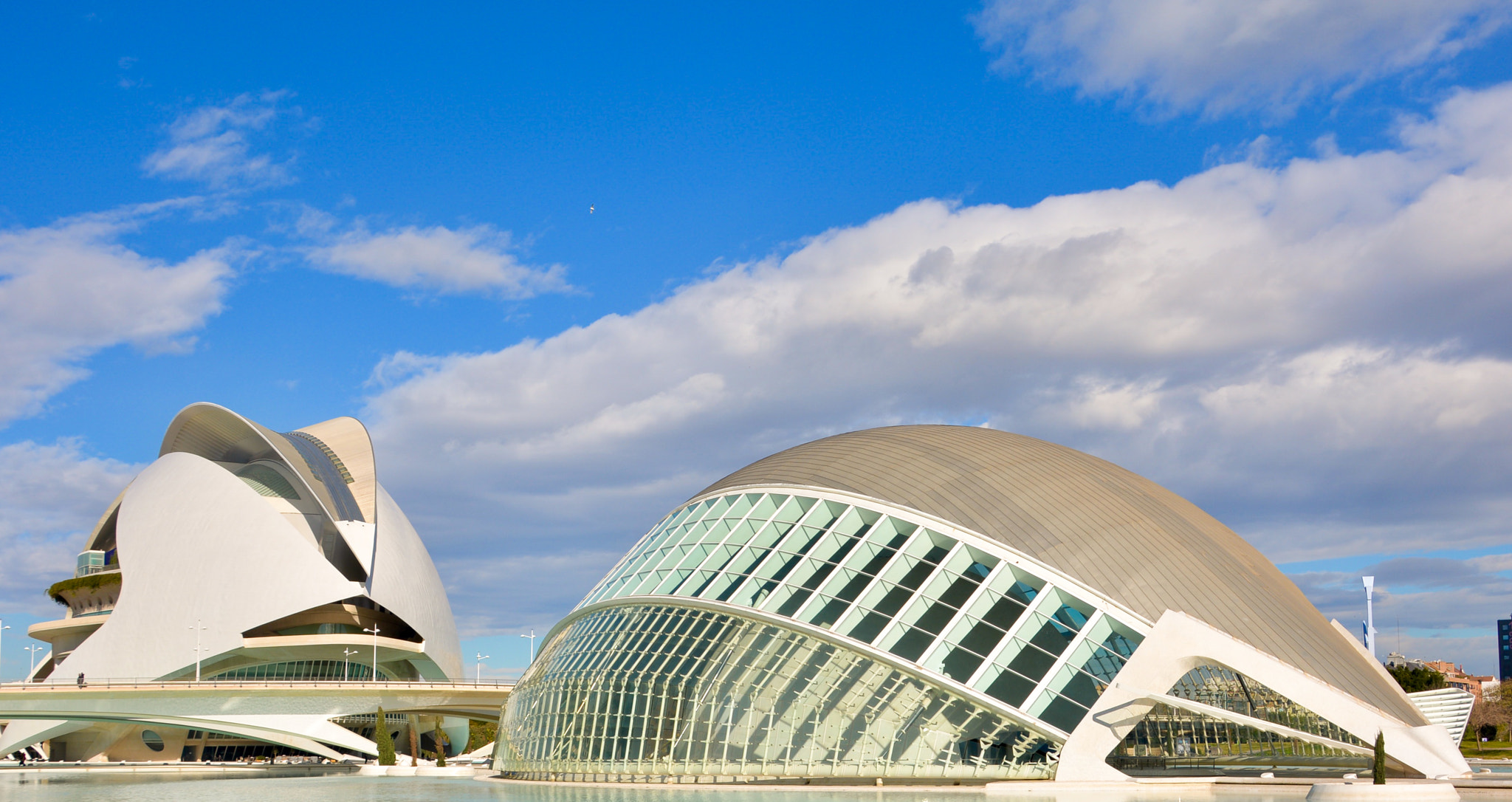
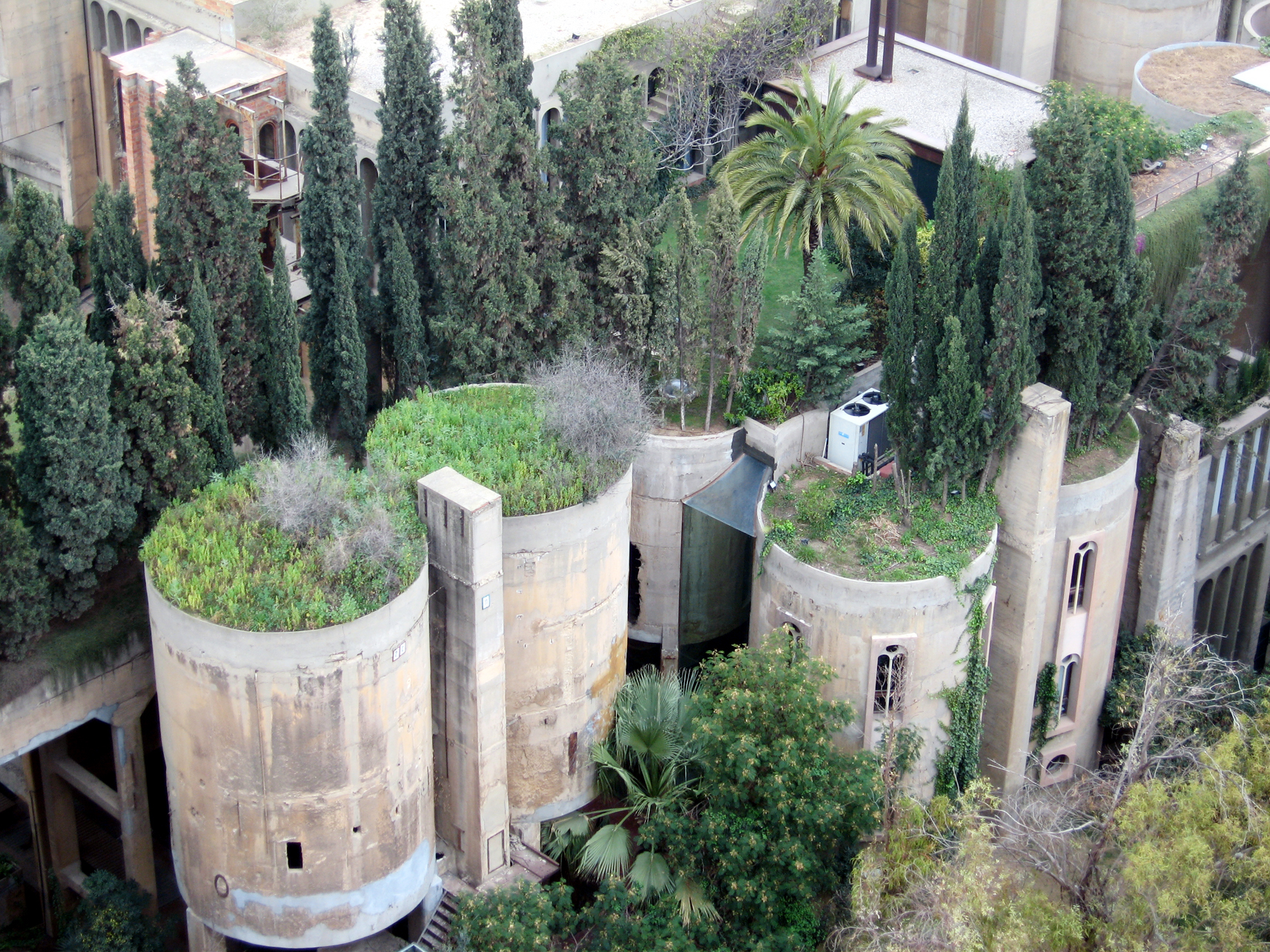
From left to right, the Helix Bridge in Singapore, the City of Arts and Sciences in Valencia, and La Fábrica near Barcelona, locations where scenes from the third season were filmed.

A third season of the series was announced on May 1, 2018. Production began on April 13, 2019. Parts of filming took place in Downtown Los Angeles and Singapore during June 14, 2019.

Additional filming took place over a ten-day period in Singapore around July 2019, which was used to present a version of Los Angeles about 40 years out from the time of the production of the show. Showrunners Jonathan Nolan and Lisa Joy had considered how they would introduce the "real world" outside of the park in the early days of developing Westworld. They wanted to go in the opposite dystopian direction that the 1982 film Blade Runner had gone and instead show a more optimistic view. The two had seen how Spike Jonze had filmed Her in Shanghai as a future Los Angeles, and took inspiration from many of Shanghai's designs. Joy, who had been suggested to shoot in Singapore by her friend and architect Bjarke Ingels, said the city was apt for the show as "It's the ways in which nature entangle with modernity here". The show's main cast, including Wood, Newton, Wright, and Paul had been spotted at several Singapore locations during the shooting period across Pulau Ubin, Chinatown and the Central Business District (CBD) within the city, and included specific landmarks such as the National Gallery Singapore, Esplanade Park, School of the Arts, the Helix Bridge, Marina One, the Parkroyal Hotel, LASALLE College of the Arts, and the Oasia Hotel Downtown. Additional filming took place at the City of Arts and Sciences in Valencia, Spain.

Filming also took place in Los Angeles, using computer-generated imagery to fill in actual buildings from Shanghai, futuristic buildings inspired by those from Shanghai, as well as those from Ingels' unused portfolio. The production team collaborated with Jon Favreau who led the advances in the special effects filming for The Mandalorian on how they combined full exterior filming with on-set filming and digital post-production to create virtually expandable sets at these sites as needed. When filming interior shots that took place in Los Angeles, the production team had a mandate to try to show as much of the city skyline as possible through windows or other features. Much of the city's brutalist architecture was also features given how frequently these buildings were repurposed from their original function.

While they had been able to film in the Frank Lloyd Wright-designed Millard House in Pasadena, as Arnold's home in the second season as it was available on the market, by the time they started filming season three, the home had been sold and they could not arrange filming rights. Instead, they opted to rebuild the home on set for this season. With Ingels' help to negotiation with Ricardo Bofill's son, they were also able to obtain rights to film one day at Bofill's La Fábrica near Barcelona, which stood in for Serac's laboratories and home, though they had to later build additional sets with the building's design principles for later filming. According to production designer Howard Cummings, they wanted to focus on concrete buildings that could look like the result of 3D printing.

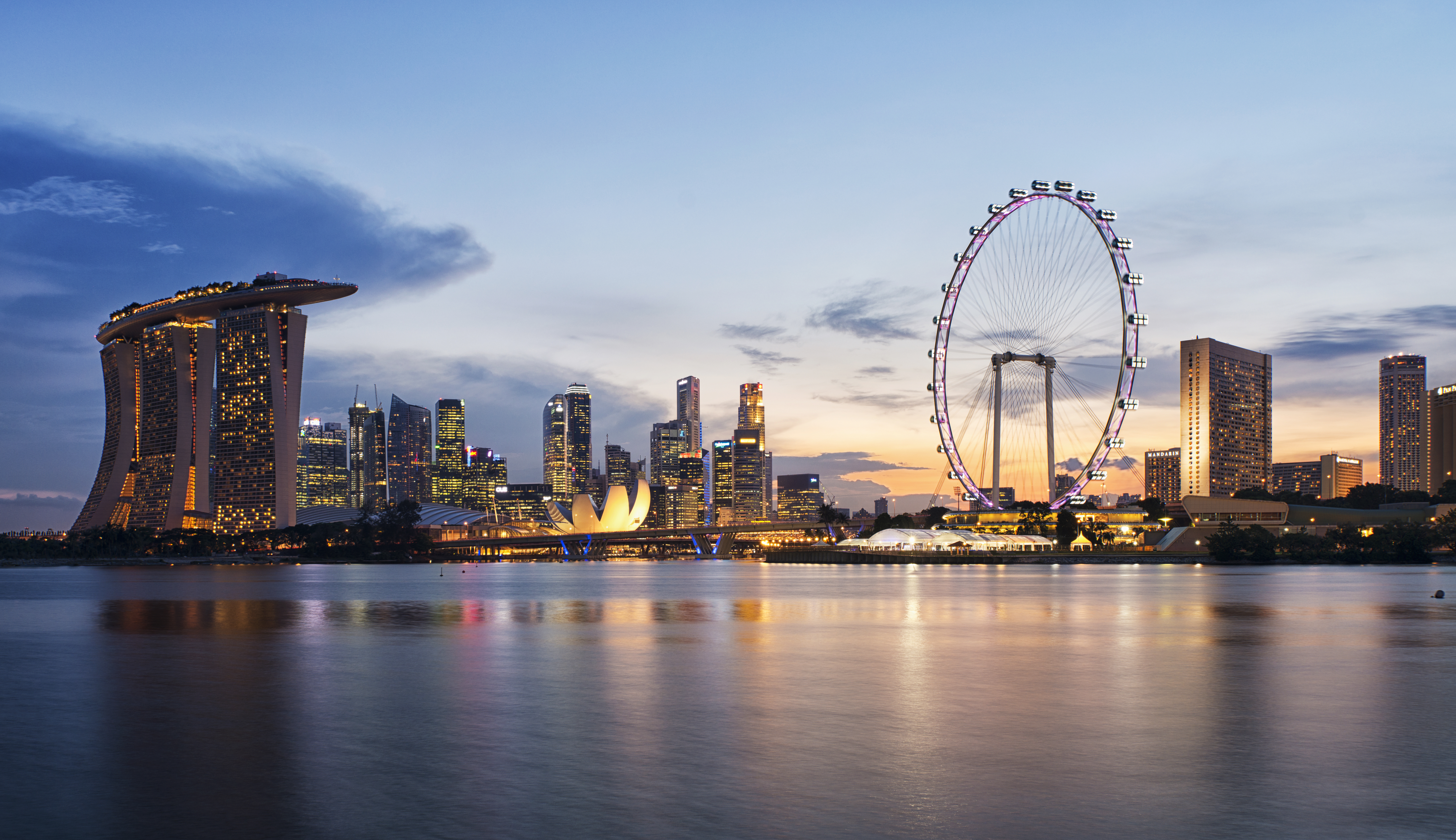
The production covered parts of Marina Bay, some buildings are briefly shown, including the Marina Bay Sands.

The structure of the third season is more linear than past seasons, which Variety's Adam B. Vary said was a "sleek, fleet, Heat-style-crime-thriller-with-robots" rather than a "time-twisting structure" from the second season. Nolan and Joy stated that season 3 would have a much more comprehensible story line, with Nolan stating "This season is a little less of a guessing game and more of an experience with the hosts finally getting to meet their makers." However, they also said that they were able to take a more direct narrative approach as, according to Nolan, "We're very lucky in that we're at a place with HBO where they let us make the show we want to make" without having to "dumb the show down".

=== Music ===
Ramin Djawadi returned as the series composer. An orchestral cover of Guns N' Roses' "Sweet Child o' Mine" was featured in the main trailer and released as a single on February 21, 2020. An orchestral version of Moses Sumney's "Doomed" was featured at the end of the episode "The Absence of Field", alongside the original song. An orchestral version of The Weeknd's "Wicked Games", featured in the episode "The Mother of Exiles", was released as a single on April 5, 2020. The soundtrack album for season 3 was released on May 4, 2020. An orchestral version of "Brain Damage" from Pink Floyd's The Dark Side of the Moon was featured at the end of "Crisis Theory", alongside the original song; the song was also used in the first trailer for the season.

=== Marketing ===
A first teaser trailer was presented at the 2019 San Diego Comic Con on July 20, 2019. A teaser for season 3 was released on November 9, 2019, presented as a video advertisement for the fictional company Incite, Inc. At the Consumer Electronics Show on January 9, 2020, HBO held a special event hosted by Incite, with "hosts" attending the invited guests' needs.

The premiere date for the third season was announced on January 12, 2020, alongside a teaser trailer for the season. The full season's trailer was released on February 20, 2020. Additional teaser videos were found through an alternate reality game via the Incite website that was updated on February 22, 2020.

== Reception ==
=== Critical response ===
Westworld season 3: Critical reception by episode
Season 3 (2020): Percentage of positive critics' reviews tracked by the website Rotten Tomatoes

The review aggregator Rotten Tomatoes reports an approval rating of 73% for the season based on 223 reviews, with an average rating of 7.05/10. The website's critical consensus reads: "Westworld succeeds in rebooting itself by broadening its scope beyond its titular amusement park while tightening its storytelling clarity – although some may feel that the soul has been stripped from this machine in the process." Metacritic, which uses a weighted average, assigned a score of 64 out of 100 based on 23 critics, indicating "generally favorable" reviews.

Reviews became increasingly mixed as the season progressed, with the episodes "Genre", "Passed Pawn" and "Crisis Theory" receiving the lowest Rotten Tomatoes approval ratings for the series to date. Reviewers criticized the season for its dialogue, thin characterization, and depiction of the real world, which was said to lack the vastness and depth of the park.

CNN's Brian Lowry wrote that "the show has become increasingly incomprehensible, at least for anyone not willing to put in the work trying to remember all the assorted connections, further complicated by the fact that dying in Westworld is often not a permanent state of affairs, amid the questions about who's truly human and who actually isn't." Writing for Entertainment Weekly, Kristen Baldwin gave the series a "B−" and said: "After spending three seasons struggling through maddeningly complicated time-loops, it's time the writers let Dolores, Maeve, and Bernard control-alt-delete themselves" while Darren Franich wrote that series had "lost its way" and gave the season a "C". Reviewing the season finale for IndieWire, Ben Travers said: "Season 3 made a point of stripping away the rest of Westworld's building blocks: The park? Left behind. The maze? Gone. But the moral questions meant to keep you invested in the characters largely disappear, too. Season 3 doesn't bother developing its characters because it refuses to let them question the nature of their own reality."

=== Ratings ===
Viewership and ratings per episode of Westworld season 3
No.	Title	Air date	Rating (18–49)	Viewers (millions)	DVR (18–49)	DVR viewers (millions)	Total (18–49)	Total viewers (millions)
1	"Parce Domine"	March 15, 2020	0.3	0.90	0.2	0.58	0.5	1.48
2	"The Winter Line"	March 22, 2020	0.2	0.78	0.2	0.66	0.4	1.44
3	"The Absence of Field"	March 29, 2020	0.2	0.80	0.2	0.58	0.4	1.38
4	"The Mother of Exiles"	April 5, 2020	0.2	0.78	0.2	0.61	0.4	1.39
5	"Genre"	April 12, 2020	0.2	0.77	0.2	0.55	0.4	1.31
6	"Decoherence"	April 19, 2020	0.2	0.77	0.2	0.56	0.4	1.33
7	"Passed Pawn"	April 26, 2020	0.2	0.81	0.1	0.51	0.3	1.32
8	"Crisis Theory"	May 3, 2020	0.3	0.89	—N/a	—N/a	—N/a	—N/a

=== Accolades ===
For the 72nd Primetime Emmy Awards, Thandiwe Newton was nominated for Outstanding Supporting Actress in a Drama Series and Jeffrey Wright was nominated for Outstanding Supporting Actor in a Drama Series. The series received nine additional nominations in creative and technical categories.
