= Chestnut (Westworld) =

- Westworld episode
- Episode no.: Season 1 Episode 2
- Directed by: Richard J. Lewis
- Written by: Jonathan Nolan; Lisa Joy
- Cinematography by: Brendan Galvin
- Editing by: Mark Yoshikawa
- Production code: 4X6152
- Original air dates: October 7, 2016 (online); October 9, 2016 (HBO)
- Running time: 59 minutes

Guest appearances
- Ptolemy Slocum as Sylvester; Leonardo Nam as Felix Lutz; Talulah Riley as Angela; Louis Herthum as Peter Abernathy

Episode chronology
← Previous "The Original"	Next → "The Stray"

"Chestnut" is the second episode in the first season of the HBO science fiction western thriller television series Westworld. The episode aired on October 9, 2016, but was released two days prior online by HBO. The episode received positive reviews from critics.

== Plot summary ==
Logan Delos brings his friend William to Westworld, and encourages him to take in the more carnal delights of the park. William remains reluctant given his recent engagement to Logan's sister. The next morning, William helps return a dropped tin of food to Dolores and leaves with a tip of the hat. Dolores returns to her farm to dig up a hidden pistol.

The Man in Black, following the maze on the scalp, arrives in time to prevent the outlaw Lawrence from being hanged. The Man takes Lawrence to the latter's village. When the Man demands he answer his questions about the maze, the villagers gather around them. The Man kills them all then Lawrence's wife, and prepares to kill his daughter when she starts to speak with a new voice, providing a clue about a snake in a riverbed. The Man leaves with Lawrence as his prisoner.

Dolores returns to Sweetwater and has visions of Hector's massacre from the day before, though no other townsperson seems aware of it. She talks to Maeve, a prostitute host, and repeats what she remembers Peter told her, which triggers Maeve to have similar visions, these of having a young daughter. After Dolores leaves, Maeve's performance with the guests declines, which is noticed by the park staff, and Elsie suggests increasing her intuition to compensate. Later, Maeve is witness to a drunken guest killing Teddy, which triggers her own flashback to the Man in Black chasing her and her daughter. The staff sees this response as a malfunction and bring Maeve in for repairs. Technicians Felix and Sylvester prepare to work on her but she wakes on her own and escapes, catching sight of what the staff does to hosts at Operations before Felix and Sylvester capture and put her in sleep mode.

Elsie expresses concern to Bernard that putting Dolores back in the park may have been the wrong decision, but Bernard asserts the host is showing no abnormal behavior. Bernard and Theresa continue to engage in a romantic relationship to an unclear end. Storyline writer Lee wants to introduce a new narrative involving a Native American conflict, but Dr. Ford vetoes it as cheap thrills, and instead asserts they will continue a new narrative with a deeper meaning. Dr. Ford takes Bernard into the park to show him a Christian shrine he found earlier that will serve as the basis for this narrative.

== Production ==
"Chestnut" was written by series co-creators Jonathan Nolan and Lisa Joy, based on the premise of the 1973 film of the same name by Michael Crichton. The episode was directed by Richard J. Lewis.

=== Music ===
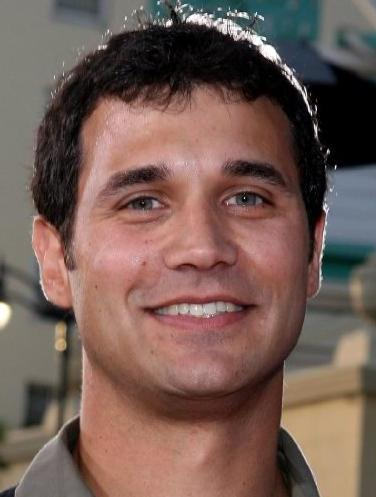
Composer Ramin Djawadi created the episode's musical score.

In an interview, The composer of the show Ramin Djawadi spoke about the piano interpretations of Radiohead's "No Surprises" used in the episode. He said, "When Jonathan says, 'Do a Radiohead song,' I say, 'Great!'" Djawadi continued, "This particular piece was pretty simple, actually. The opening arpeggiated riff from 'No Surprises' translates really well into piano." He noted, "The way I see it, it’s like a jukebox in a restaurant, When you put money in it, it plays preprogrammed pieces. These particular pieces that the piano plays help you with the sense of time, the repeats. It just marks time, and it provides the recognition factor that this is a preprogrammed event."

== Reception ==
=== Ratings ===
"Chestnut" was viewed by 1.50 million American households on its initial viewing. The episode also acquired a 0.7 rating in the 18–49 demographic. In the United Kingdom, the episode was seen by 1.37 million viewers on Sky Atlantic.

=== Critical reception ===
"Chestnut" received positive reviews from critics. The episode currently has a 95% score on Rotten Tomatoes and has an average rating of 8.3 out of 10, based on 21 reviews. The site's consensus reads "Aided by its excellent ensemble cast, Chestnut deepens and expands Westworld's captivating mythology by revealing the park through the eyes of a first-time guest and diving further into the lives of its robotic residents."

Eric Goldman of IGN reviewed the episode positively, saying, "Building upon the excellent pilot, the second episode of Westworld gave us more insight into how the park works and what it's like for a guest to arrive." He gave it a score of 9.1 out of 10. Scott Tobias of The New York Times wrote in his review of the episode; "Creators Jonathan Nolan and Lisa Joy have made some big conceptual changes in adapting Crichton’s film for television, most notably the attention they've given to the androids' perspective. But this minor alteration pushes some important questions to the fore: What does the park reveal about the people who visit? And what do they learn about themselves in the process?". Zack Handlen of The A.V. Club wrote in his review, "'Chestnut' isn't as effective a mood piece as 'The Original'; it's functional in necessary ways, settling down to the business of being an actual TV show and not just an evocative one hour film. But while that functionality isn't as exciting, it still works well enough, laying the groundwork for what's ahead, and working in the depth that the pilot could only suggest. If the series can maintain this level of quality of better as the season goes on, we should be in for quite a ride." He gave the episode a B+.

Liz Shannon Miller of IndieWire wrote in her review, "What's most intriguing about Westworld is that the imperfections of this world are profoundly tied up in its mysteries. It's tempting to get hung up on trying to solve them. But consider this remark from Dr. Ford, perhaps a meta-commentary on the show itself: "Guests don't return for the obvious things we do, the garish things. They come back because of the subtleties." And the subtleties of the show, so far, are worth appreciating." She gave the episode an A−. Erik Kain of Forbes also reviewed the episode, saying, "So far, I've really enjoyed Westworld. I find the mystery enticing, much like I found Lost in its first season. Hopefully this show doesn't suffer that show's fate. But I've seen plenty of complaints. The cast is too big. The show tipped its hand too soon. The story is too convoluted."
