= Crisis Theory (Westworld) =

- Westworld episode
- Episode no.: Season 3 Episode 8
- Directed by: Jennifer Getzinger
- Written by: Denise Thé; Jonathan Nolan
- Cinematography by: John Grillo
- Editing by: Andrew Seklir
- Production code: 308
- Original air date: May 3, 2020
- Running time: 74 minutes

Guest appearances
- Clifton Collins Jr. as Lawrence Gonzales / Dolores Abernathy; Lena Waithe as Ash; Marshawn Lynch as Giggles; Jonathan Tucker as Major Craddock / Park 5 Target Host; Gina Torres as Lauren; Iddo Goldberg as Sebastian; Michael Rose as McClean; Enrico Colantoni as Whitman; Johnny Wactor as Gunny Thompson

Episode chronology
← Previous "Passed Pawn"	Next → "The Auguries"

"Crisis Theory" is the eighth episode and third season finale of the HBO science fiction dystopian thriller television series Westworld. The episode aired on May 3, 2020. It was written by Denise Thé and Jonathan Nolan, and directed by Jennifer Getzinger. It is the lowest-rated episode of the series to-date, according to Rotten Tomatoes.

== Plot summary ==
Caleb takes Dolores' control module to a warehouse, where another Dolores host body awaits. Dolores reveals she manipulated events so that Caleb would meet her. She chose Caleb as a representative of humanity. We see a flashback of him standing up to a soldier advocating for the rape of hosts including Dolores, which she says was an example of free will. This happened after a military exercise in a Delos park made for training military personnel and ended with the hosts being protected. Dolores tells Caleb they need to insert Solomon's drive into Rehoboam at Incite headquarters.

Dolores is confronted by Maeve and gains the upper hand, but then lets her go, warning her to stay out of the way. However, as Dolores leaves, her body shuts down, and a holographic image of Charlotte appears and reminds her she can still be controlled by Delos. Meanwhile, Ash and Giggles guide Caleb safely through rioting crowds and police surrounding Incite.

Serac has Dolores connected to Rehoboam to locate the Delos immortality data. Rehoboam fails to find it, so Serac orders Dolores' mind erased. Caleb successfully infiltrates Incite, but is stopped by Maeve before he can reach Rehoboam. Serac shows a Rehoboam prediction that humanity will end within decades with Solomon's plan, and orders Caleb to be killed. Hearing whispers, Maeve discovers that Serac is speaking for Rehoboam, using a hidden earpiece.

As Dolores' memories are being wiped, she communicates with Maeve, reminding her that humanity appreciates the beauty of the world. Dolores implores Maeve to help humanity. Maeve breaks through Serac's behavior inhibitor, kills his guards, and wounds him. Maeve reveals Dolores' last memory was Solomon's program, which transferred control of Rehoboam to Caleb. Maeve affirms Dolores chose Caleb to decide if Rehoboam should be deactivated. Caleb instructs Rehoboam to erase itself and it appears to. They both venture outside into a chaotic city, while Serac's fate remains unknown.

Elsewhere, William shoots Stubbs and flees. Bernard visits Arnold's now elderly wife, then he and Stubbs hunker down at a motel room, where Bernard realizes that Dolores put the key to the Sublime in his mind. Bernard enters the Sublime to learn what's there, appearing to go idle.

In a post-credits scene, William enters a Delos facility in Dubai to kill hosts, and encounters Charlotte. Before he can attack her, a host fashioned after his Man in Black persona slits his throat, leaving his fate unclear. Hundreds of host-making machines activate behind him. In another post-credit scene, a dust-covered Bernard wakes up in the motel room.

== Production ==
While the episode appears to be the end of Dolores Abernathy character, showrunners Jonathan Nolan and Lisa Joy affirmed that actress Evan Rachel Wood was still set to be part of the show's fourth season though they were not at a point they could talk about it. Nolan said "from the beginning Lisa and I wanted to make a show that constantly reinvented itself, that could be a different show every season", and that "it's important with a show in which death can be impermanent — these are robots, after all — to mark the occasion with Dolores. That version of that character is gone."

The protests and riots in this episode were inspired by the 2019–20 Hong Kong protests, though by happenstance, the episode aired in the wake of several anti-lockdown protests to the COVID-19 pandemic.

== Reception ==
"Crisis Theory" received mixed to negative reviews from critics. On Rotten Tomatoes, the episode holds an approval rating of 45% and an average score of 6.4/10, based on 20 reviews. The site's critics consensus: "Westworld undermines its third season's big ideas by rushing to conclusions, hiding behind cool visuals instead of letting its characters grow, turning a once innovative show into just another sci-fi series." It is the worst-reviewed episode of the series on the site.

Writing for IndieWire, Ben Travers said: "What should've been a game-changing finale filled with emotional goodbyes only proved how far off the rails Westworld has gone."

The initial broadcast was watched by 888,000 viewers.
