= Genre (Westworld) =

- Westworld episode
- Episode no.: Season 3 Episode 5
- Directed by: Anna Foerster
- Written by: Karrie Crouse; Jonathan Nolan
- Cinematography by: Zoë White
- Editing by: Andrew Seklir
- Production code: 305
- Original air date: April 12, 2020
- Running time: 60 minutes

Guest appearances
- John Gallagher Jr. as Liam Dempsey Jr.; Tommy Flanagan as Martin Conells; Lena Waithe as Ash; Scott Mescudi as Francis; Marshawn Lynch as Giggles; Jefferson Mays as Liam Dempsey Sr.; Pom Klementieff as Martel; Alexandre Bar as Young Serac; Paul Cooper as Jean Mi; Iddo Goldberg as Sebastian; Al Coronel as President Filo; Bahia Haifi Gold as Dr. Greene; Enrico Colantoni as Whitman

Episode chronology
← Previous "The Mother of Exiles"	Next → "Decoherence"

"Genre" is the fifth episode in the third season of the HBO science fiction dystopian thriller television series Westworld. The episode aired on April 12, 2020. It was written by Karrie Crouse and Jonathan Nolan, and directed by Anna Foerster.

The episode polarized critics and audiences, with some praising its creativity and calling it one of the best of the series, while others denounced its departure from the show's original premise and deemed it among the worst. It was also the least-viewed episode of the series.

== Plot summary ==
Serac recounts the creation of Rehoboam: after he and his brother Jean witnessed the nuclear destruction of Paris, the two created a system to predict and control human behavior to avoid similar catastrophes. For seed data, they partnered with Incite's Liam Dempsey Sr., who was more interested in using the system to make money. Serac found that Rehoboam identified high-risk individuals like Jean that could disrupt future events, and secured them in a secret facility. He justifies this to Dempsey by saying that Jean had planned to kill Dempsey. Serac kills Dempsey himself sometime later, staging his death in a plane crash. In the present, Serac begins controlling governments around the world by sharing information from Rehoboam.

In the present, Dolores and Caleb escort Liam to safety as Serac's forces hunt them. Liam attempts to escape and injects Caleb with "genre", a hallucinogenic drug that makes Caleb experience the world through several film genres. Dolores convinces Liam to give her his private key to Rehoboam to aid in their escape. They meet up with Ash and Giggles to help with protecting Liam.

Meanwhile, Martin has taken Bernard to Incite headquarters, where Rehoboam is housed. Martin uses Liam's key to access the records on Serac to send them to Dolores. She uses it as a weapon against humans, (Note: Martin explains to Bernard: "The right information, at the right time, is deadlier than any weapon.") directing Martin to send out Rehoboam's data on every person in the world to themselves. Death and destruction quickly spreads across the globe as people learn Rehoboam has been used to control their lives. Ashley arrives to help rescue Bernard from Martin, but Martin knows he is no longer necessary to Dolores' plan and tells them to pursue Serac's secret facilities. When Serac's security questions Martin, he detonates a bomb and kills them and Serac's assistant, Martel.

Dolores and Caleb continue on to a local airport, with Liam, Ash, and Giggles in tow. Dolores tells Caleb that with Martin dead, they no longer need Liam, and Caleb struggles with what to do. Angered by the data held by Rehoboam, Ash fatally shoots Liam, and she and Giggles leave. Liam mumbles about Caleb's past as he dies, and Caleb experiences several confusing visions related to his military days. As the plane prepares to leave, Dolores reviews records of Serac's memories from Incite's database. She allows Serac to contact and taunt her, but she tells him she has all she needs before cutting communications.

== Production ==
"Genre" was an idea that showrunner Jonathan Nolan wanted to explore at one point in the series, stating that it represented the overall trend to draw in influences from current popular culture of television, films, and video games. While Westworld established that the six Delos parks existed for the wealthy to live and indulge in a different world, the more common would turn to a druglike "genre" to experience a similar approach. Nolan drew in part from Roald Dahl's Charlie and the Chocolate Factory and the experimental three-course gum idea, where by chewing on the gum, the chewer would experience each of the three courses of a meal in turn.

Nolan said that the idea for Rehoboam was not the apparent biblical reference but to Stand on Zanzibar by John Brunner, a book that involved a corporation that ran an artificial intelligence which exerted control over people's lives. The book's AI was named after Shalmaneser, in reference to Shalmaneser V, the King of Assyria and Babylon during the eighth century BC, which gave Nolan the idea to borrow on other names of historical kings for the AI in Westworld (in this case, to Rehoboam, the first king of Judah). Further, Shalmaneser in the novel was described as placed in the open lobby of the corporation that ran it, leading to Nolan presenting Rehoboam to also be well-visible and central to the lobby of Incite.

=== Music ===
The five main film genres were used, each with music scored by the series' composer Ramin Djawadi in order:

- Caleb first experiences the world from film noir as they make their initial escape. The film was nearly desaturated, but leaving some of the silver color in shots with Caleb. Nolan asked Djawadi for a piece somewhere between the themes used in the films Out of the Past and Vertigo.
- The next genre Caleb experiences as they elude Serac's men in vehicles is an action genre. Nolan directly drew from Apocalypse Now by director Francis Ford Coppola and the iconic "Ride of the Valkyries" by German composer Richard Wagner, the music associated with that film.
- As they finish off their pursuers, Caleb begins to experience a romance film. The score from the film Love Story by composer Francis Lai was used during these portions.
- During the subway scenes, Caleb experiences a drama film. "Nightclubbing" by Iggy Pop, which had been used in the film Trainspotting, was used in the score as an indication of the transition to drama and as a reference to the film.
- Caleb has a brief interlude with "reality" as they leave the subway with the world having learned the data that Serac had on them, during which Djawadi's cover of David Bowie's "Space Oddity" is used.
- Finally, Caleb experiences a thriller-horror genre as they try to figure out what to do with Liam. Here, the music from Stanley Kubrick's The Shining performed by Wendy Carlos that incorporates the Dies irae hymn was used.

The final scene and the end credits used "Emerge" by Fischerspooner.

== Reception ==
"Genre" polarized reviewers, with some calling it one of the strongest episodes of the series to date and others deeming it the worst. On Rotten Tomatoes, it holds an approval rating of 68% and an average score of 7.71/10, based on 19 reviews. The site's critics consensus reads: "'Genre' seals a divisive distancing from the show's origins and establishes the rules of this brave new Westworld, amid chases, megalomaniac plans and an entertaining trip."

The original broadcast was watched by 766,000 viewers, the lowest total of the series to-date.
