= Decoherence (Westworld) =

- Westworld episode
- Episode no.: Season 3 Episode 6
- Directed by: Jennifer Getzinger
- Written by: Suzanne Wrubel; Lisa Joy
- Cinematography by: John Grillo
- Editing by: Ali Comperchio
- Production code: 306
- Original air date: April 19, 2020
- Running time: 58 minutes

Guest appearances
- Rodrigo Santoro as Hector Escaton / Ettore; Jimmi Simpson as young William; Peter Mullan as James Delos; Michael Ealy as Jake; Jonathan Tucker as Major Craddock; Jaxon Williams as Nathan; Russell Wong as Brompton; Payman Maadi as Elliot; Iddo Goldberg as Sebastian; Charmin Lee as Joanna; Zayd Kiszonak as Child William; Siena Goines as Dr. Natasha Lang; Louis Ferreira as Dr. Alpert

Episode chronology
← Previous "Genre"	Next → "Passed Pawn"

"Decoherence" is the sixth episode in the third season of the HBO science fiction dystopian thriller television series Westworld. The episode aired on April 19, 2020. It was written by Suzanne Wrubel and Lisa Joy, and directed by Jennifer Getzinger.

== Plot summary ==
Serac has a Delos board member killed, which ensures the company cannot prevent his immediate takeover. Charlotte calls Dolores to inform her that this happened. She feels increasingly out of place in her body, but Dolores insists she get the data they need as planned. Serac orders the destruction of the park hosts and host data and to test all employees for a host. Charlotte uses the distraction to make the host data copy that Dolores needs. She also discovers William's location, and that Serac is using the host machines at Delos to make four new hosts. Later, Serac identifies her as the Dolores host. Charlotte attempts to escape.

Maeve is told by Serac that she will get a new host body as well as allies to help in the fight against Dolores. She is brought into the Warworld simulation and meets Lee again. She finds that her host module has been moved as well as the three additional hosts being prepared. This includes one for Hector, and she helps bring back Hector's prior memories. She, Hector, and Lee find that the damaged module, the copy of Dolores that was in Martin, is also attached to the simulation. Maeve asks this Dolores about her plans. Dolores recognizes that Maeve would likely be seeking allies and would have planned ahead. Maeve is too late to stop Charlotte from destroying the Hector control module. Maeve soon wakes up in her new host body and waits for the two untouched hosts to arise.

William resists traditional therapy at the mental institution, so he is fitted with an implant that can access his limbic system. Through it, the doctors make him have an augmented reality therapy session with his earlier selves as well as James Delos. This shows that there was a point in his teenage life where he chose violence, which led him down this path. William comes to a catharsis as he violently beats up his other selves. He claims he has now chosen to be the "good guy." He is pulled out of this state by Bernard and Ashley. The facility was otherwise abandoned after everyone received their Rehoboam profile.

Serac's men chase Charlotte away from the host machines but not before she grabs the damaged Dolores's core. Charlotte races home to take her ex-husband Jake and son Nathan to safety, but Serac's men destroy the car. A charred Charlotte survives.

== Reception ==
"Decoherence" received generally positive reviews from critics. On Rotten Tomatoes, the episode holds an approval rating of 84% and an average score of 6.57/10, based on 19 reviews. The website's critics consensus reads: "'Decoherence' finds the characters in unexpected places, positioning Westworld's third season for its final battle."

The initial broadcast was watched by 771,000 viewers.
