= Memento Mori (short story) =

2001 short story by Jonathan Nolan

- Short story by Jonathan Nolan
- Country: United States
- Language: English
- Genre: Crime fiction

Publication
- Published in: Esquire
- Publication date: 2001

"Memento Mori" is a short story written by Jonathan Nolan and published in the March 2001 edition of Esquire magazine. It was the basis for the 2000 film Memento directed by his brother Christopher Nolan. The name refers to memento mori.

== Synopsis ==
A man named Earl has anterograde amnesia. Because of his inability to remember things for more than a few minutes, he uses notes and tattoos to keep track of new information. Earl owes his condition to an attack against him and his wife by an unknown assailant. His wife was raped and killed while Earl suffered severe head injuries, resulting in his amnesia. The story jumps between two timeframes. The first timeframe finds Earl confined to a mental institution, which he learns through written notes he had left himself. The second timeframe finds Earl on the run after he escapes from the mental institution. He learns this through a third-person narrative. Earl's goal after escaping the institution is to find the man who murdered his wife and get revenge.

== Background ==
Jonathan Nolan got the idea for the story from his general psychology class at Georgetown University. He pitched the idea to his brother Christopher during a cross-country road trip from Chicago to Los Angeles. Christopher responded enthusiastically to the idea, and encouraged Jonathan to write a first draft. After Jonathan returned to Washington, D.C., to finish college, he sent his brother a draft two months later, and Christopher set to work on a screenplay, while Jonathan began finishing the short story.

Christopher made the feature film Memento (2000), starring Guy Pearce, which was inspired by Jonathan's story, although significantly different. For example, in the short story, Earl is confined to a mental institution and the main character in the film is not. Also, in the film, the protagonist's attempt to seek revenge on his wife's killer is manipulated by other characters. In the short story, other characters, such as doctors, are only briefly mentioned. Jonathan's short story was published in Esquire magazine. It also appeared in James Mottram's making-of book about the film, The Making of Memento, and as a hidden special feature on the film's special edition DVD.
