= Passed Pawn (Westworld) =

- Westworld episode
- Episode no.: Season 3 Episode 7
- Directed by: Helen Shaver
- Written by: Gina Atwater
- Cinematography by: Matt Flannery
- Editing by: Anna Hauger
- Production code: 307
- Original air date: April 26, 2020
- Running time: 58 minutes

Guest appearances
- Scott Mescudi as Francis; Hiroyuki Sanada as Musashi / Sato; Jonathan Tucker as Major Craddock; Bahia Haifi Gold as Dr. Greene; Enrico Colantoni as Whitman; Paul Cooper as Jean Mi / Solomon; Johnny Wactor as Gunny Thompson; Wayne Péré as Therapist (archive footage)

Episode chronology
← Previous "Decoherence"	Next → "Crisis Theory"

"Passed Pawn" is the seventh episode in the third season of the HBO science fiction dystopian thriller television series Westworld. The episode aired on April 26, 2020. It was written by Gina Atwater and directed by Helen Shaver.

== Plot summary ==
Charlotte calls Musashi and announces that she has a plan of her own. Musashi is met by Clementine and Hanaryo—the two hosts that Serac brought to help Maeve—and they kill Musashi.

Dolores and Caleb head to Serac's re-education facility in Mexico to look for Solomon, the AI that had been developed by Serac's brother Jean Mi prior to Rehoboam. En route, Caleb recounts his military mission to Crimea to deal with a rebel group using data tracking systems. His unit was one of the systems' targets. The entire unit was killed, except for Caleb and Francis. They subsequently captured a rebel leader, but when their planned evac failed to arrive, they made their own attempt to escort their captive to safety. Francis and the rebel leader were killed.

After Solomon is revived, it reveals that Caleb had been successfully reconditioned by Serac, and that those who failed reconditioning were put into cryogenic sleep. Caleb and Francis had been in the military but were discharged after the Crimea attack. They subsequently became agents to serve Serac's system and round up other outliers. The Rico app was used to arrange these abductions.

They received pills used by military personnel to improve combat performance. The rebel leader they captured was really the CEO of the pharmaceutical company that provided the pills. He was deemed a threat for asking too many questions. Whitman revealed the truth to Caleb and warned him that Rico would tell Francis to kill Caleb. Francis admits this and is about to kill Caleb, but Caleb kills him, which he was re-conditioned to forget.

Dolores implores Solomon to launch the plan Jean Mi had envisioned before being put away. Solomon agrees as Maeve arrives at the facility. Maeve gains the advantage on Dolores, and Solomon provides Caleb a data device with instructions on how to kill Serac. Dolores makes it inside the facility and activates an EMP that disables Solomon, Maeve, and herself.

Meanwhile, Bernard and Ashley discover Dolores is interested in Caleb and that he is an outlier. As they leave the Incite facility, William reveals he has a new purpose: to destroy all hosts. Bernard dissuades Ashley from killing William because he believes they will still need him. He warns Ashley that he believes Dolores will use Caleb to destroy humanity. William finds a gun and prepares to kill Bernard and Ashley.

== Production ==
With this episode, Angela Sarafyan and Tao Okamoto were added to the main cast credits, reprising their roles as the hosts Clementine Pennyfeather and Hanaryo, respectively.

The title of the episode is a reference to chess. In chess, a passed pawn is a pawn that is unimpeded by any enemy pawns from reaching the opponent's edge of the board, where it can be promoted to a more powerful piece. Having a passed pawn sometimes requires strategy and sacrifice; in a similar way, Dolores' plan has appeared to involve significant sacrifice to get Caleb to engage with Solomon by the end of the episode.

== Reception ==
On Rotten Tomatoes, the episode holds an approval rating of 53% and an average score of 6.46/10, based on 19 reviews. The website's critics consensus reads: "'Passed Pawn' brings together the seasons' many threads, but the results are mild at best, opening a serviceable path for the grand finale that may leave audiences wanting."

The initial broadcast was watched by 813,000 viewers.
