= Anna Foerster =

American film director

- Born: 1971 (age 54–55); Germany
- Occupations: Cinematographer, television director, film director
- Years active: 1994–present

Anna J. Foerster (born 1971) is a German-born American film and television cinematographer and director. She is best known for pioneering the use of the ARRI Alexa camera system.

== Career ==
As a second unit cinematographer, Foerster worked on the films Alien Resurrection (1997), Ballistic: Ecks vs. Sever (2002), Johnson Family Vacation (2004), The Day After Tomorrow (2004), Æon Flux (2005) and 10,000 BC (2008), also working as a second unit director on the latter four films.

She was the cinematographer for the visual effects and/or miniature unit on Independence Day (1996), Godzilla (1998), Pitch Black (2000) and Stuart Little 2 (2002).

As a director, she directed five episodes of the television series Criminal Minds, an episode of its spin-off Criminal Minds: Suspect Behavior, three episodes of Unforgettable, and four episodes of the Starz series Outlander.

In 2008, she was reported to be developing Secret Hunter, based on the Ranulph Fiennes novel The Secret Hunters (2002).

She served as director of photography on Anonymous (2011) and White House Down (2013). On Anonymous, she was one of the first directors to use the ARRI Alexa camera system, using a prototype provided by ARRI.

Foerster made her feature film directing debut with the action horror film Underworld: Blood Wars (2016).

== Filmography ==
=== Film ===
Cinematographer

Year	Title	Director	Notes
2003	Coronado	Claudio Fäh	With Jaime Reynoso and Steven Douglas Smith
2011	Anonymous	Roland Emmerich	
2012	Dark Horse	Roland Emmerich	TV movie
2013	White House Down	Roland Emmerich	

Director

- Underworld: Blood Wars (2016)
- Lou (2022)

=== Television ===
Director

Year	Title	Episode(s)
2009-2011	Criminal Minds	"Cold Comfort"
2009-2011	Criminal Minds	"The Uncanny Valley"
2009-2011	Criminal Minds	"Reflection of Desire"
2009-2011	Criminal Minds	"With Friends Like These..."
2009-2011	Criminal Minds	"From Childhood's Hour"
2011	Criminal Minds: Suspect Behavior	"Strays"
2011-2012	Unforgettable	"Trajectories"
2011-2012	Unforgettable	"Heartbreak"
2012	Army Wives	"The War at Home"
2014-2015	Outlander	"The Wedding"
2014-2015	Outlander	"Both Sides Now"
2014-2015	Outlander	"Wentworth Prison"
2014-2015	Outlander	"To Ransom a Man's Soul"
2015	Madam Secretary	"Face the Nation"
2018	Jessica Jones	"AKA Start at the Beginning"
2019	Carnival Row	"Kingdoms of the Moon"
2019	Carnival Row	"The Joining of Unlike Things" (Co-directed with Thor Freudenthal)
2020	Westworld	"Genre"
2024	Dune: Prophecy	"The Hidden Hand"
2024	Dune: Prophecy	"In Blood, Truth"
2024	Dune: Prophecy	"The High-Handed Enemy"
