= Encore Hollywood =

Former post production facility

- Industry: post-production
- Headquarters: Hollywood, California
- Website: www.encorehollywood.com

Encore Hollywood, was a post production facility headquartered in Hollywood, California.

== History ==
Encore Hollywood was created in 1985. It was part of Deluxe Entertainment Services Group Inc.'s network of facilities before its closure.

Encore VFX, is the only surviving business unit of Encore Hollywood, now part of Company 3/Method Inc.

The Encore Hollywood facility building at 6344 Fountain Ave, Los Angeles, CA 90028 was demolished in 2021.

== Credits ==
=== Television credits ===
- Alias
- Castle – ABC
- Drop Dead Diva - Sony
- Big Love – HBO
- House - Fox
- Lie to Me – Fox
- Melrose Place – CBS
- NCIS – CBS
- Elementary - CBS

=== Feature film credits ===
- Night Watch (2004 film) (uncredited)
- The Hurt Locker
- Zombieland
- Casino Royale
- Spider-Man
- Primeval
