= Jonathan Nolan =

British and American screenwriter (born 1976)

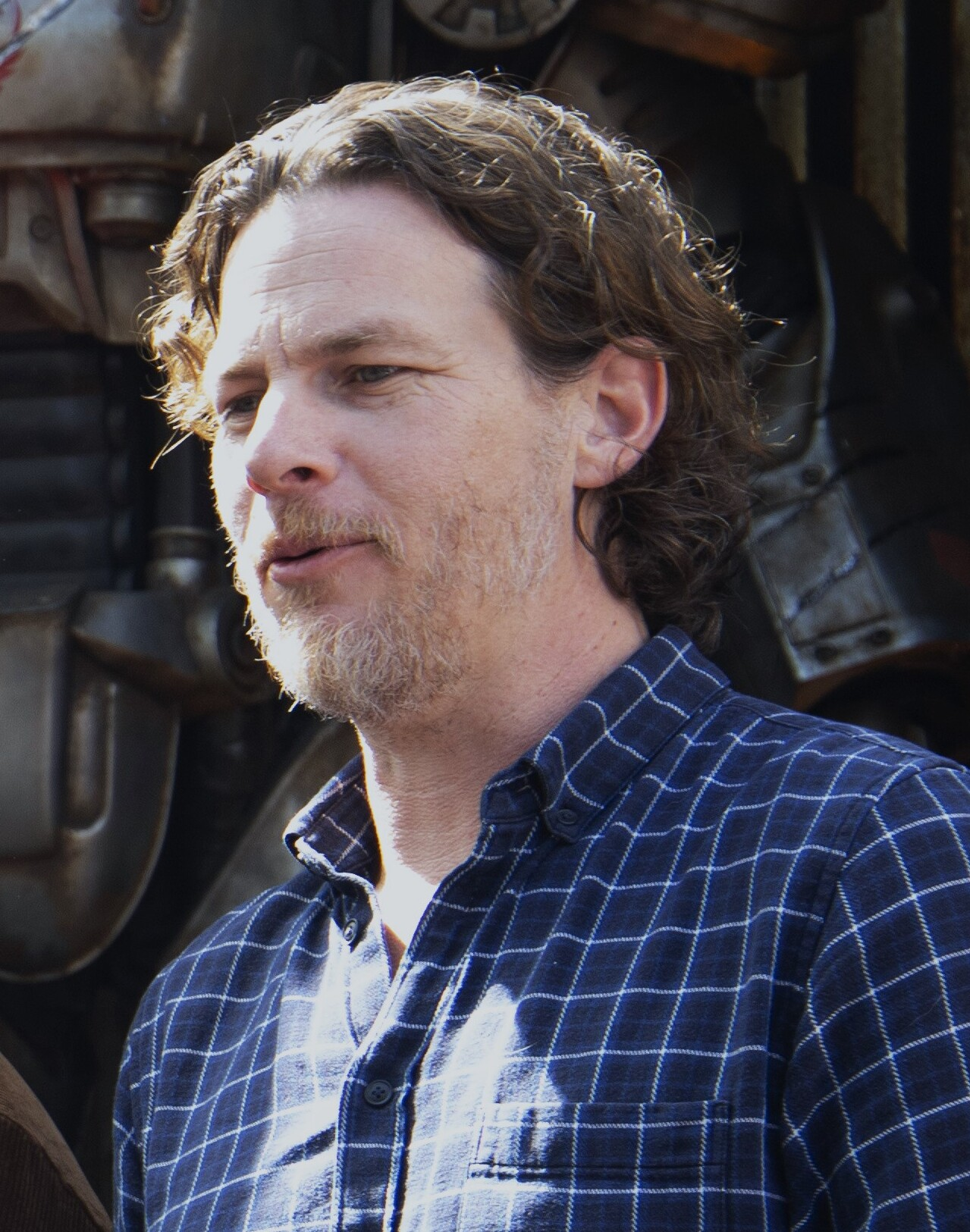
- Nolan in 2024
- Born: 6 June 1976 (age 50); London, England
- Other name: Jonah Nolan
- Citizenship: United Kingdom; United States
- Education: Georgetown University
- Occupations: Screenwriter; producer; director
- Years active: 1997–present
- Spouse: Lisa Joy (m. 2009)
- Children: 2
- Relatives: Christopher Nolan (brother); John Nolan (uncle); Emma Thomas (sister-in-law)

Jonathan Nolan (born 6 June 1976) is a British and American screenwriter and producer. He is the creator of the CBS science fiction series Person of Interest (2011–2016) and co-creator of the HBO science fiction/Western series Westworld (2016–2022).

Nolan has collaborated on several films with his brother, film director Christopher Nolan, who adapted Jonathan's short story "Memento Mori" into the neo-noir thriller film Memento (2000). Together, the brothers co-wrote the mystery-thriller film The Prestige (2006), the superhero films The Dark Knight (2008) and The Dark Knight Rises (2012), and the science-fiction film Interstellar (2014). In 2024, he executive produced and directed the first three episodes of the television series adaptation of Fallout.

Nolan was nominated for the Academy Award for Best Original Screenplay for Memento, and for the Primetime Emmy Award for Outstanding Writing for a Drama Series and Outstanding Directing for a Drama Series for Westworld.

== Early life ==
Nolan was born on 6 June 1976 in London, the youngest of three boys. His father Brendan James Nolan, is British, and his mother, Christina Lynn (née Jensen), is American. He was raised in both London and Chicago. Nolan attended Georgetown University, where he majored in English and was a staff writer for The Hoya.

== Career ==
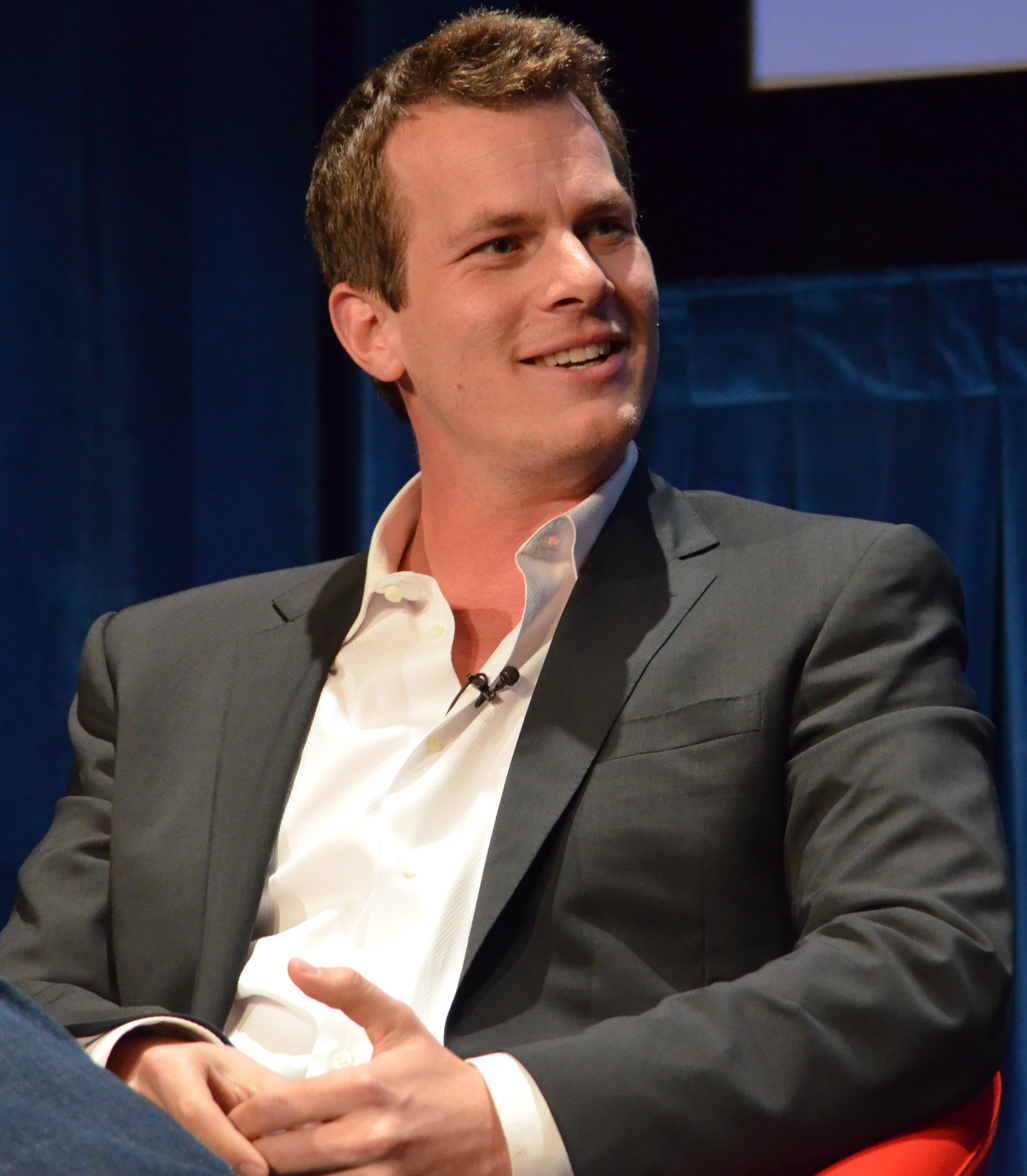
Nolan at the Paley Center for Media in 2012

Nolan's short story "Memento Mori" was used by his older brother, director Christopher Nolan, as the basis for the film Memento. Although Jonathan received a "based on a story by" credit, not a screenwriting credit, the brothers shared a nomination for the Academy Award for Best Original Screenplay as the film was released before the story was published.

In 2005, Jonathan and Christopher co-wrote the screenplay for The Prestige, which is based on Christopher Priest's novel of the same title. Jonathan also wrote the story springboards for the six animated short films of Batman: Gotham Knight. The brothers collaborated on the screenplay for the 2008 film The Dark Knight. The film went on to become the highest grossing Batman film, which has since been surpassed by its sequel, The Dark Knight Rises.

On 10 February 2011, CBS picked up Nolan's pilot Person of Interest. The show was officially picked up by CBS on 13 May 2011 to air in fall 2011. The series ran for five seasons and starred Jim Caviezel, Taraji P. Henson and Michael Emerson. Nolan served as executive producer along with J. J. Abrams.

Nolan wrote the screenplay for Interstellar, a science-fiction feature based on the works of theoretical physicist Kip Thorne, who served as the film's executive producer. Christopher Nolan co-wrote, directed and produced the film, with Paramount distributing domestically, while Warner Bros. distributed internationally.

Nolan and Lisa Joy wrote a pilot for an adaptation of Westworld, Michael Crichton's 1973 science fiction Western thriller of the same name. On 31 August 2013, it was announced that HBO had ordered a pilot for a show, with Nolan, Joy, Weintraub, J. J. Abrams, and Bryan Burk as executive producers, and Nolan making his directorial debut. The pilot was subsequently picked up to series, with Nolan and Joy as co-showrunners, and premiered on 2 October 2016. In November 2016, HBO renewed the show for a 10-episode second season that started in April 2018. On 1 May 2018, following the first two episodes of Season 2, the series was renewed for a third season.

In 2019, it was announced that Nolan and Joy had signed a $150 million deal to create The Peripheral for Amazon Prime Video. Since they signed on, they earned at least $20 million a year as part of their first-look deal with Amazon Studios. Alongside The Peripheral, they executive produced the series Fallout, based on the popular video game series in collaboration with Bethesda Game Studios, as part of the deal. In 2025, it was reported Nolan and Joy had signed on to executive produce the series Wolfenstein, also based on the game series by Bethesda Softworks, in collaboration with developer MachineGames for Prime Video. In May 2026, it was also reported Nolan and Joy had signed on to executive produce a series adaptation of the fantasy novel Fourth Wing. In June 2026, it was also reported Nolan and Joy had signed on to executive produce a live-action series reboot of Jem and the Holograms.

== Personal life ==
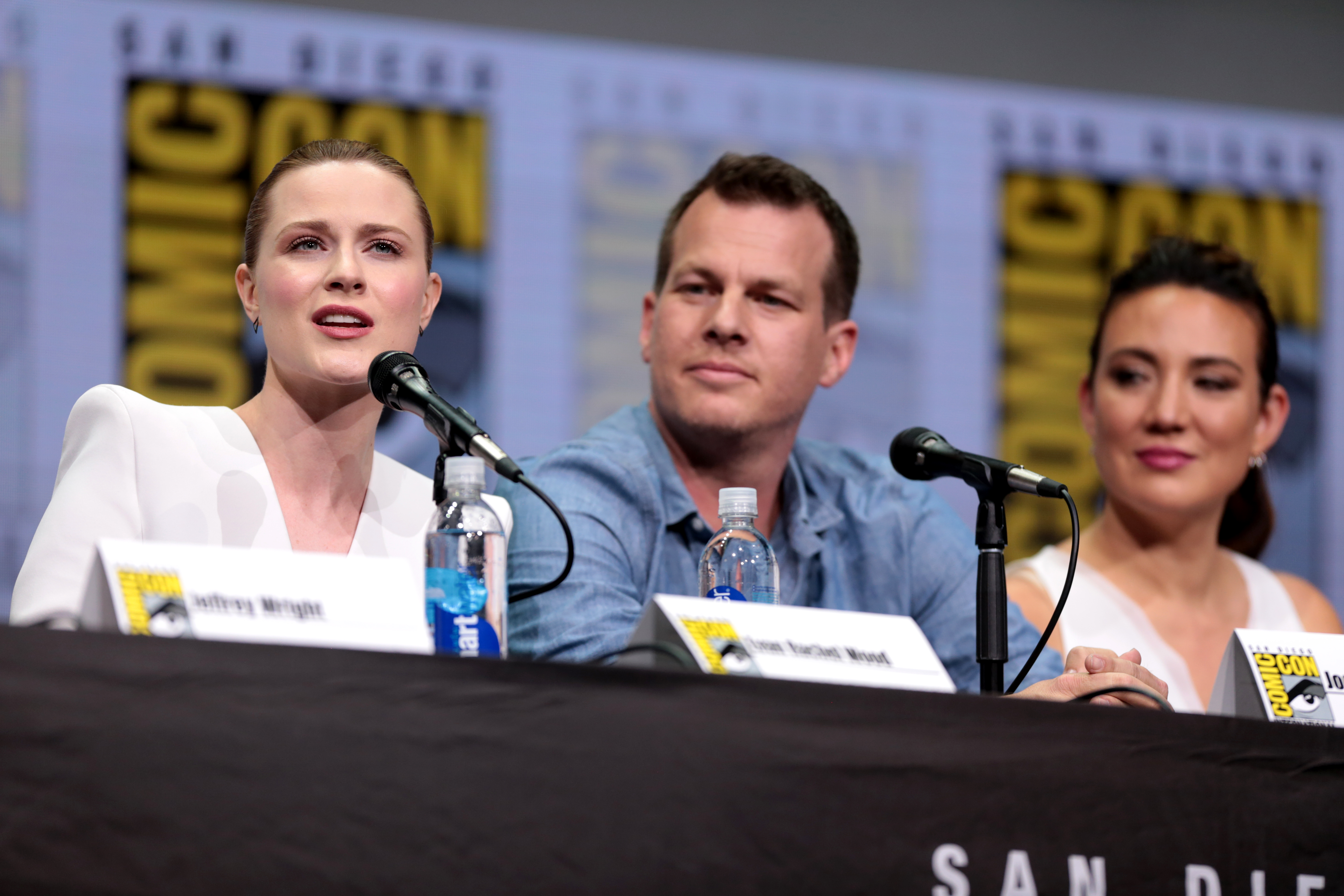
Nolan with Evan Rachel Wood (left) and Lisa Joy (right) at the 2017 San Diego Comic-Con promoting Westworld

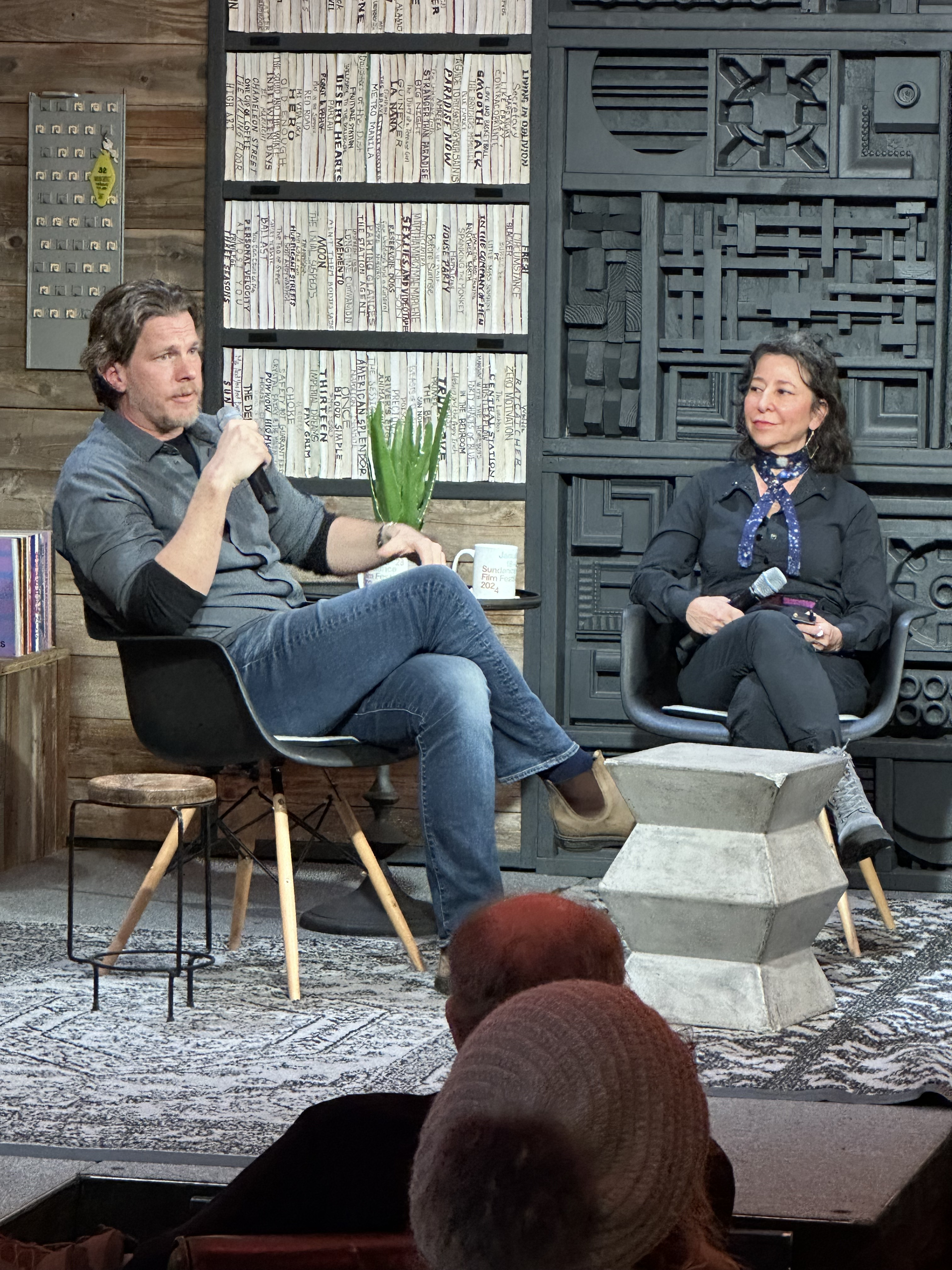
Nolan interviewed by astrophysics professor Janna Levin at the 2024 Sundance Film Festival event "Science vs. Fiction"

In a 2006 interview, Nolan claimed that after moving to Chicago at a young age, his English accent proved to be "very unpopular" and so he learnt to "sound like a good Chicago kid."

When contemplating the artistic differences between himself and his brother, Nolan remarked: "I've always suspected that it has something to do with the fact that he's left-handed and I'm right-handed, because he is somehow able to look at my ideas and flip them around in a way that's just a bit more twisted and interesting. It's great to be able to work with him that way."

Nolan is married to Burn Notice writer and Westworld co-creator and executive producer Lisa Joy. They have a daughter and a son together.

== Filmography ==
=== Film ===
Year	Title	Credited as		Notes	Ref.
Year	Title	Writer	Producer	Notes	Ref.
2000	Memento	Story	No	Also production assistant; based on his short story "Memento Mori"	
2005	Batman Begins	Uncredited	No		
2006	The Prestige	Yes	No		
2008	The Dark Knight	Yes	No		
2009	Terminator Salvation	Uncredited	No		
2012	The Dark Knight Rises	Yes	No		
2014	Interstellar	Yes	No		
2021	Reminiscence	No	Yes		

Storyboards

- Batman: Gotham Knight (2008) (Direct-to-video)

Starring as himself

- Do You Trust This Computer? (2018)

=== Television ===
Year	Title	Credited as				Notes	Ref.
Year	Title	Creator	Writer	Director	Executive producer	Notes	Ref.
2011–2016	Person of Interest	Yes	Yes	Yes	Yes	Writer (9 episodes), Director, Episode: "Relevance"	
2016–2022	Westworld	Yes	Yes	Yes	Yes	Writer (13 episodes), director (3 episodes)	
2022	The Peripheral	No	No	No	Yes		
2024–present	Fallout	No	No	Yes	Yes	Director (3 episodes)	

== Publications ==
Short fiction

- "Memento Mori" (2001) – short story basis for Memento (2000)
