= Lisa Joy =

American screenwriter and executive producer

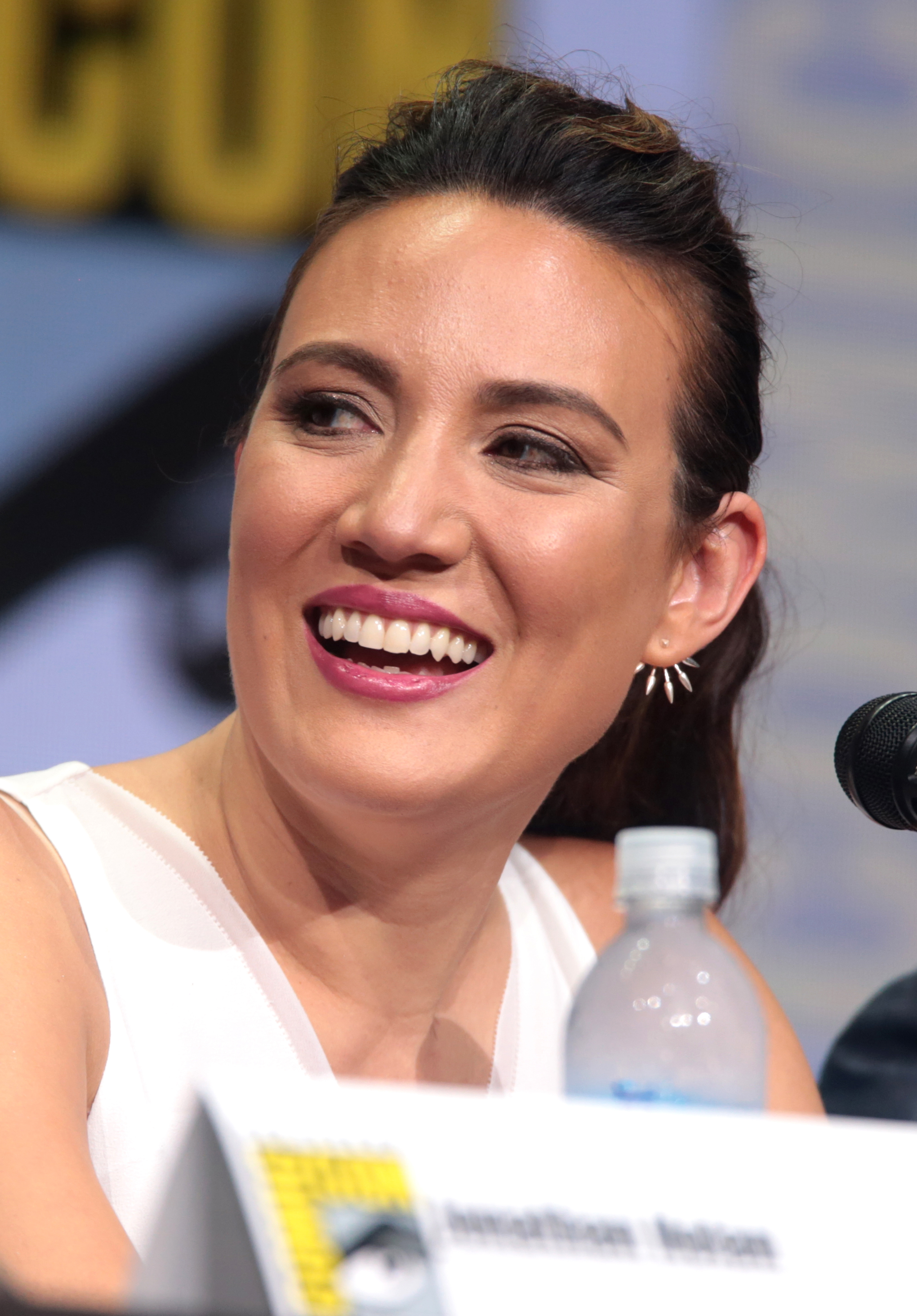
- Joy at the 2017 San Diego Comic-Con
- Born: May 23, 1977 (age 49); New Jersey, U.S.
- Education: Stanford University (BA); Harvard University (JD)
- Occupations: Film director; film producer; screenwriter
- Years active: 2007–present
- Spouse: Jonathan Nolan (m. 2009)
- Children: 2
- Relatives: Christopher Nolan (brother-in-law); Emma Thomas (sister-in-law)

Lisa Joy (born May 23, 1977) is an American screenwriter, director, producer, and lawyer. She is best known as the co-creator, writer, director, and executive producer of the HBO science-fiction drama series Westworld (2016–2022). For her work on the series, she received multiple Primetime Emmy Award nominations. Joy's other work includes the ABC comedy series Pushing Daisies (2007–2009) and the USA Network crime drama series Burn Notice (2009–2011). In 2021, she made her feature film directorial debut with Reminiscence.

== Early life and education ==
Lisa Joy was raised in New Jersey in an immigrant family. Her father is from England and her mother is Taiwanese.

Joy graduated from Stanford University and worked as a consultant at McKinsey & Company in San Francisco before attending Harvard Law School. Joy was admitted to the bar in 2009 and practiced law in California prior to her career in entertainment.

== Career ==
While studying for the bar, Joy submitted a sample script for the ABC fantasy comedy-drama series Pushing Daisies. A friend passed the script along to a television producer, helping her get the job as a staff writer in 2007. She went on to become the only female writer on the USA Network crime drama series Burn Notice. She later served as a co-producer on the series.

In 2016, Joy co-created the HBO science fiction series Westworld and served as its co-showrunner. Westworld ran for four seasons. The series focuses on "a futuristic theme park gone wrong where robots start rebelling against humans". The series went on to become one of the most popular series on television. For her work on the series, Joy earned nominations for the Primetime Emmy Award for Outstanding Drama Series and Outstanding Writing for a Drama Series, among others.

Joy, along with her husband Jonathan Nolan, signed an overall deal with Amazon to write and produce original series for the company. The deal is worth $150 million over five years. As a part of the deal, Joy and Nolan were announced as executive producers on a science fiction series The Peripheral, an adaptation of the post-apocalyptic video game series Fallout, an adaptation of the fantasy novel Fourth Wing, and a live-action series reboot of Jem and the Holograms.

Joy's feature film debut, Reminiscence, was released by Warner Bros. Pictures in US cinemas on August 20, 2021, to mixed reviews and was a commercial failure.

== Personal life ==
Joy married screenwriter Jonathan Nolan, the younger brother of director Christopher Nolan. The two first met at the premiere of the film Memento, which was based on Jonathan's short story "Memento Mori," and written and directed by Christopher.

The couple have a daughter and a son.

== Filmography ==
Film

Year	Title	Director	Writer	Producer
2021	Reminiscence	Yes	Yes	Yes

Television

Year	Title	Credited as				Notes
Year	Title	Creator	Director	Writer	Executive producer	Notes
2007–2009	Pushing Daisies	No	No	Yes	No	3 episodes
2009–2011	Burn Notice	No	No	Yes	No	19 episodes, also producer
2016–2022	Westworld	Yes	Yes	Yes	Yes	Writer (14 episodes), director, Episode: "The Riddle of the Sphinx"
2022	The Peripheral	No	No	No	Yes	
2024–present	Fallout	No	Yes	No	Yes	Director, Episode: "The Other Player"

== Awards and nominations ==
Year	Association	Category	Work	Result	Ref.
2008	Writers Guild of America Awards	Best New Series	Pushing Daisies	Nominated	
2016	Rondo Hatton Classic Horror Awards	Best Television Presentation	Westworld	Nominated	
2017	Writers Guild of America Awards	Best New Series	Westworld	Nominated	
2017	Writers Guild of America Awards	Best Dramatic Series	Westworld	Nominated	
2017	Producers Guild of America Awards	Best Episodic Drama	Westworld	Nominated	
2017	Gold Derby Awards	Drama Episode of the Year	Westworld	Nominated	
2017	Dragon Awards	Best Science Fiction or Fantasy TV Series	Westworld	Nominated	
2017	Edgar Allan Poe Awards	Best Episode in a TV Series	Westworld	Nominated	
2017	Primetime Emmy Awards	Outstanding Drama Series	Westworld	Nominated	
2017	Primetime Emmy Awards	Outstanding Writing for a Drama Series	Westworld	Nominated	
2018	Primetime Emmy Awards	Outstanding Drama Series	Westworld	Nominated	
