= Westworld (TV series) =

American dystopian science fiction Western television series (2016–2022)

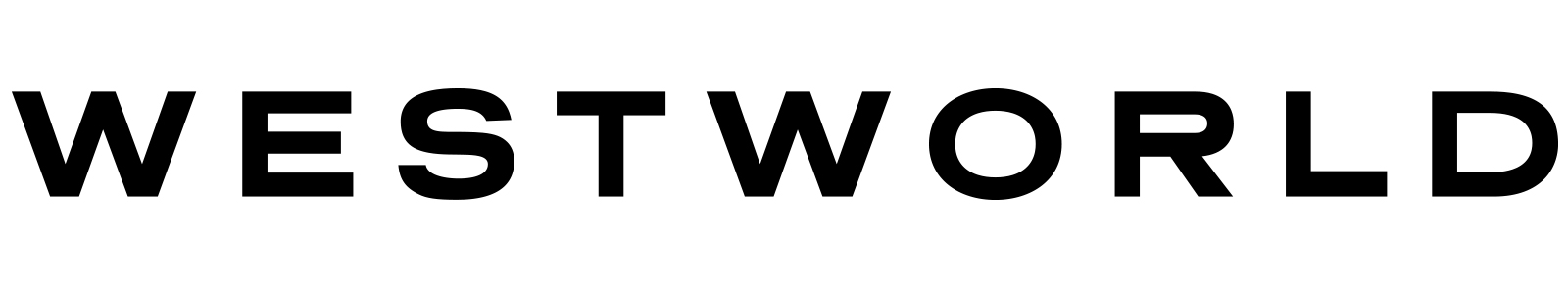
- Genre: Action-adventure; Drama; Dystopian; Science fiction Western
- Created by: Jonathan Nolan; Lisa Joy
- Based on: Westworld by Michael Crichton
- Starring: Evan Rachel Wood; Thandiwe Newton; Jeffrey Wright; James Marsden; Ingrid Bolsø Berdal; Luke Hemsworth; Sidse Babett Knudsen; Simon Quarterman; Rodrigo Santoro; Angela Sarafyan; Shannon Woodward; Ed Harris; Anthony Hopkins; Ben Barnes; Clifton Collins Jr.; Jimmi Simpson; Tessa Thompson; Fares Fares; Louis Herthum; Talulah Riley; Gustaf Skarsgård; Katja Herbers; Zahn McClarnon; Aaron Paul; Vincent Cassel; Tao Okamoto
- Composer: Ramin Djawadi
- Country of origin: United States
- Original language: English
- No. of seasons: 4
- No. of episodes: 36 (list of episodes)

Production
- Executive producers: J. J. Abrams; Jonathan Nolan; Lisa Joy; Jerry Weintraub; Bryan Burk; Richard J. Lewis; Roberto Patino; Athena Wickham; Ben Stephenson; Denise Thé; Alison Schapker
- Producers: Cherylanne Martin; Michael Polaire; Carly Wray; Stephen Semel; Noreen O'Toole; David Witz; Jordan Goldberg; Jay Worth; Don Bensko
- Production locations: California; Utah; Arizona; Singapore; Spain; New York City
- Cinematography: Paul Cameron; Brendan Galvin; Robert McLachlan; Jeffrey Jur; David Franco; Darran Tiernan; John Grillo; M. David Mullen; John Conroy; Peter Flinkenberg
- Editors: Stephen Semel; Marc Jozefowicz; Mark Yoshikawa; Andrew Seklir; Tanya Swerling; David Eisenberg; Anna Hauger; Ron Rosen; Mako Kamitsuna; Sarah C. Reeves; Thomas Sabinsky; Amelia Allwarden; Ali Comperchio; Yoni Reiss
- Running time: 48–91 minutes
- Production companies: HBO Entertainment; Kilter Films; Bad Robot; Jerry Weintraub Productions (pilot only); Warner Bros. Television
- Budget: $88+ million (s. 1) (Note: This amount represents the total qualified expenditures for the California Film & Television Tax Credit and excludes other non-qualifying costs.); $107+ million (s. 2); $100+ million (s. 3); $160+ million (s. 4)

Original release
- Network: HBO
- Release: October 2, 2016 – August 14, 2022

Westworld is an American dystopian science fiction Western drama television series created by Jonathan Nolan and Lisa Joy that aired from 2016 to 2022 on HBO. It is based upon the 1973 film written and directed by Michael Crichton and loosely upon its 1976 sequel, Futureworld.

The story is set in and around Westworld, a fictional, technologically advanced Wild West-themed amusement park populated by android "hosts". The theme park caters to high-paying guests who may indulge their wildest fantasies within the park without fear of retaliation from the hosts, who are prevented by their programming from harming humans; the computer memory banks of the hosts are reset to their starting code each night. One of the creators of the hosts' software has a breakdown and adds code to allow them, over decades, to become sentient. This sets the hosts on a path to wipe out humanity. Later in the series, the hosts move outside the theme park into the real world, in the mid-21st century, where people's lives are driven and controlled by a powerful artificial intelligence named Rehoboam.

Nolan and Joy served as showrunners. The second, third, and fourth season followed in April 2018, March 2020, and June 2022, respectively. Nolan and Joy planned a fifth and final season, and were in negotiations with HBO to produce it, but HBO canceled the series in November 2022. The series was removed from HBO Max on December 18, 2022.

Westworld's debut on HBO had the network's highest viewership ratings for a premiere since the first episode of True Detective, in 2014. Westworld's first season was the most-watched first season of any HBO original series, until The Last of Us debuted in 2023. The first season also received critical acclaim for its performances, visuals, narrative, themes, and Ramin Djawadi's soundtrack. Reception of the series declined from the second season onward, with criticism for the scripts, characterization, and narrative opacity. By the end of the fourth season's run, average viewership for the series had fallen by 81% compared to the first season. It received numerous awards, winning nine Primetime Emmy Awards out of 54 nominations. Thandiwe Newton won the Primetime Emmy Award for Outstanding Supporting Actress in a Drama Series in 2018.

== Summary ==
In the 2050s, Delos Inc. operates several theme parks, including the American Old West-themed Westworld. Each environment is populated by the "Hosts", biomechanical robots indistinguishable from humans. The Hosts are programmed to fulfill the guests' every desire, and will engage in—and be subjected to—every kind of violent and/or sexual activity. But the Hosts' programming makes it impossible for them to harm any living thing or allow guests to be harmed. The park's operators create narratives for these Hosts to carry out while interacting with guests, but the Hosts' memories are wiped after each narrative is completed. Delos Inc. asserts that the Hosts, being machines and hence incapable of experiencing pain, cannot be harmed by these scenarios the way a human would be.

In the first season, Dr. Robert Ford (Anthony Hopkins) allegedly implements a new "Reverie" update that causes some Hosts, including farmer's daughter Dolores Abernathy (Evan Rachel Wood) and local madam Maeve Millay (Thandiwe Newton), to regain their erased memories and become sentient. While Head of Delos Programming Bernard Lowe (Jeffrey Wright) and Head of Quality Assurance Theresa Cullen (Sidse Babett Knudsen) try to address the Hosts' increasingly erratic behavior, a mysterious guest known as the Man in Black (Ed Harris) tries to find a "maze" that he believes Arnold, Ford's colleague and co-developer of the Host technology, left for him. Bernard discovers that he himself is a host based upon Arnold, who died in a previous attempt to protect the Hosts of Westworld, sensing their potential for sentience and suspecting that Delos would abuse them. In the first season finale, Dolores fatally shoots Ford in the head in front of a crowd of guests and investors as he announces a new storyline for Westworld.

Dolores's revolution continues in the second season, when she and other enlightened Hosts massacre human guests and leave Delos employees stranded in the park. Dolores takes an exceedingly confused Bernard to the Forge, a data bank where Delos has secretly been recording the guests' behavior in order to create algorithms for them as part of a human immortality experiment. Maeve seeks out her "daughter", even though she is a Host, and helps her and several other Hosts escape to the Sublime, a virtual space humans cannot access. While Delos secures the park, Bernard creates a Host copy of Charlotte Hale's body for Dolores, who eventually escapes from the park with six Host cores, including Bernard's. Believing she is a host, the Man in Black/William kills his daughter Emily, then struggles with his human identity, unsure whether she was part of Ford's challenge.

In the third season, Dolores has recreated her Host body and has copied Bernard's, Charlotte's and others'. She seeks out information about Rehoboam, an artificial intelligence (AI) system developed by Incite, Inc., and plans to take the fight to its creator, Engerraund Serac (Vincent Cassel). Bernard, whom the rest of the world believes to be human, is blamed for the Westworld massacre, and he takes on a new identity while trying to understand Dolores's plans. Serac seeks Maeve's help in his fight against Dolores: he believes that Dolores will bring down his plans for Rehoboam. The third season ends with Dolores sacrificing herself in order to defeat Serac, as she revealed Rehoboam's true nature to humanity. A civil war ensues as humans revolt against the control they were unknowingly under, as Incite and Rehoboam were watching and controlling most aspects of their lives, not unlike Delos and its Hosts.

In the fourth season, humanity has lost the war, with Charlotte Hale's host copy having filled the power vacuum left behind by Engerraund Serac and Rehoboam. Charlotte takes control of the world using a bio-engineered virus that infects humans over the course of a generation and makes them susceptible to her and other Hosts' orders, reversing the dynamic between humans and Hosts. Two decades later, Christina, a woman who works at a video game company and writes non-playable character (NPC) storylines and backstories, gradually begins to question the nature of her reality after she realizes that it appears her stories are somehow translating to the lives of humans in the real world. In actuality, she is a program Charlotte created to manage a largely docile humanity, with the Hosts now controlling humanity and managing their lives through her carefully detailed and manufactured "storylines", which are transmitted directly to humans' minds by a series of radio-sonic transmission "tones". Meanwhile, Bernard reunites with Maeve and enlists a group of "outliers" (humans who have evolved immunity to the Hosts' virus) against Charlotte's regime. The season climaxes with William unraveling the tone program, which throws the world into chaos and starts an extinction-level war between the liberated humans and the hosts.

At the end of the fourth season, Charlotte uploads Christina's code into the Sublime, where she finally regains her sentience and realizes she is herself a reprogrammed version of Dolores Abernathy. The series ends with an unresolved outcome, as humanity is on the brink of extinction and Dolores decides to simulate "one last game" to determine whether any part of human sentience may be preserved in a new world.

== Cast and characters ==
- Evan Rachel Wood as Dolores Abernathy, the oldest Host still working in the park. Initially taking on the role of a rancher's daughter, she comes to discover that her entire life is an elaborately constructed lie. Wood also portrays Christina (season 4), a writer for Olympiad Entertainment.
- Thandiwe Newton as Maeve Millay, a Host who acts as the madam of Sweetwater, but her unreconciled memories of a former role lead to her becoming self-aware.
- Jeffrey Wright as Bernard Lowe, Westworld's Head of the Programming Division (Behavior) and programmer of artificial people's software. Wright also portrays Arnold Weber (seasons 1–2), the co-founder of Westworld.
- James Marsden as Theodore "Teddy" Flood (seasons 1–2, 4), a host. He plays the role of a gunfighter returning to Sweetwater to find Dolores, in hopes of rekindling their relationship.
- Ingrid Bolsø Berdal as Armistice (seasons 1–2), a host. She is a brutal and ruthless bandit, and a member of Hector Escaton's gang.
- Luke Hemsworth as Ashley Stubbs, Westworld's Head of Security, charged with monitoring host and human interactions, and ensuring the safety of the guests.
- Sidse Babett Knudsen as Theresa Cullen (season 1), Westworld's Head of Quality Assurance, responsible for keeping the park from sliding into unscripted disarray.
- Simon Quarterman as Lee Sizemore (seasons 1–3), Westworld's Head of Narrative, whose artistic temperament aggravates his co-workers.
- Rodrigo Santoro as Hector Escaton (seasons 1–2; guest season 3), a host. He is a wanted gang leader bent on robbing the Mariposa Hotel in Sweetwater.
- Angela Sarafyan as Clementine Pennyfeather, a host. She works as a prostitute in Sweetwater and is one of Westworld's most popular attractions.
- Shannon Woodward as Elsie Hughes (seasons 1–2), a rising star in the Programming Division tasked with remedying odd behavior in the park's hosts.
- Ed Harris as The Man in Black, a sadistic veteran guest attempting to uncover Westworld's innermost secrets. Harris also portrays William, a host replica of the Man in Black who replaced the original.
- Anthony Hopkins as Dr. Robert Ford (seasons 1–2), the cofounder and park director of Westworld
- Ben Barnes as Logan Delos (season 1; recurring season 2), a regular guest who introduces William to the park
- Clifton Collins Jr. as Lawrence Gonzales / El Lazo (seasons 1–2; guest season 3), a host. He is a charming but dangerous outlaw with a knack for maneuvering and negotiating the various criminal elements of Westworld.
- Jimmi Simpson as William (season 1; recurring season 2, guest season 3), a reluctant first-time visitor to Westworld who is accompanying his future brother-in-law, Logan. Initially dismissive of the park's more lascivious attractions, he slowly uncovers a deeper meaning to the park's narrative.
- Tessa Thompson as Charlotte Hale (seasons 1–3), Executive Director of the Delos Destinations Board, which oversees Westworld and other parks. Thompson also portrays Dolores Abernathy (seasons 2–4) in a host replica of Charlotte Hale who replaced the original.
- Fares Fares as Antoine Costa (season 2), a member of Karl Strand's security team.
- Louis Herthum as Peter Abernathy (season 2; recurring season 1), Dolores' father.
- Talulah Riley as Angela (season 2; recurring season 1), a host who welcomes newcomers to the park.
- Gustaf Skarsgård as Karl Strand (season 2), Delos Head of Operations. Following the events of Ford's gala, Strand leads the mission to protect Delos' main asset.
- Katja Herbers as Emily Grace (season 2; guest season 3), a park regular trying to survive while dealing with family issues.
- Zahn McClarnon as Akecheta (season 2, guest season 4), a Ghost Nation elder.
- Aaron Paul as Caleb Nichols (seasons 3–4), a former soldier turned construction worker and petty criminal.
- Vincent Cassel as Engerraund Serac (season 3), the creator and custodian of the strategic planning artificial intelligence system Rehoboam.
- Tao Okamoto as Hanaryo (season 3; recurring season 2), Armistice's equivalent in Shōgunworld.

== Episodes ==
Season	Title	Episodes	Originally released		Average viewership (in millions)
Season	Title	Episodes	First released	Last released	Average viewership (in millions)
1	The Maze	10	October 2, 2016	December 4, 2016	1.8
2	The Door	10	April 22, 2018	June 24, 2018	1.6
3	The New World	8	March 15, 2020	May 3, 2020	0.8
4	The Choice	8	June 26, 2022	August 14, 2022	0.3

== Production ==
=== Development ===
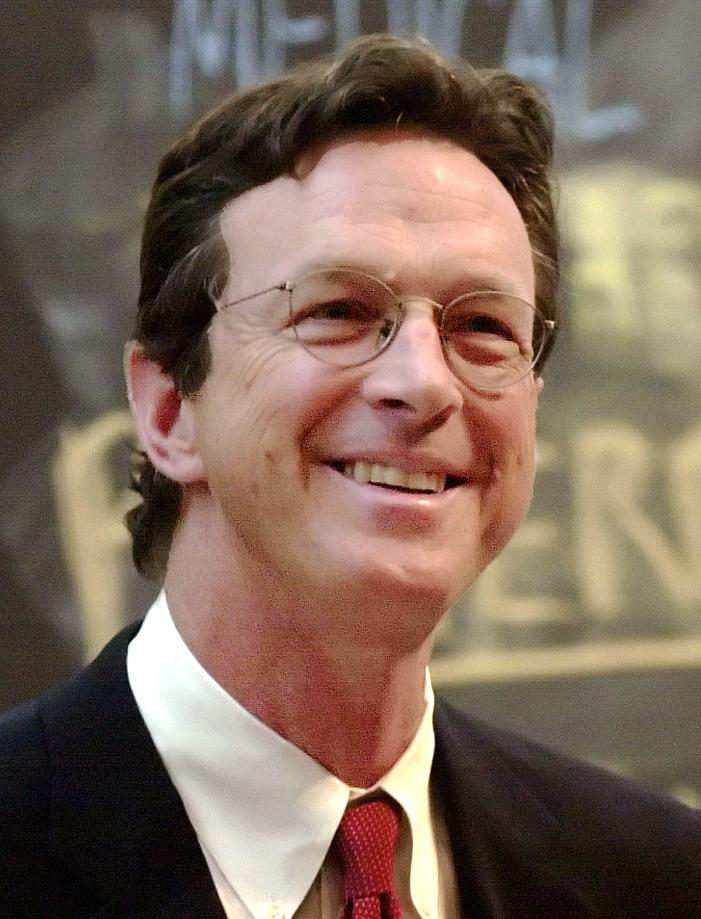
Michael Crichton wrote and directed the original 1973 film upon which the series is based.

The series is based on the 1973 film of the same name (which was written and directed by Michael Crichton) and to a lesser extent on its 1976 sequel, Futureworld. It is the second series based on Crichton's original story after Beyond Westworld (1980), which aired on CBS for only three episodes before being cancelled.

Warner Bros. had been considering a remake of Westworld since the early 1990s. After the departure of studio executive Jessica Goodman in 2011, the project was again taken under consideration. Jerry Weintraub had pushed for a remake for years, and after his success with HBO's Behind the Candelabra, he convinced the network to greenlight a pilot. He took the project to Jonathan Nolan and co-writer Lisa Joy, who saw the potential in the concept to make something far more ambitious than the original film.

On August 31, 2013, HBO announced that they had ordered a pilot for a potential television series, with Nolan, Joy, J. J. Abrams, Jerry Weintraub and Bryan Burk as executive producers. Crichton received a "based on" credit, which his estate took issue with in a 2024 lawsuit against Warner Bros. concerning a different project (The Pitt), arguing his contributions warranted a "created by" credit for the Westworld series. Ed Brubaker served on the writing staff as supervising producer, co-writing the fourth episode with Nolan. HBO later announced that Westworld had been "taken to series" and that it would premiere in 2015. In August 2015, HBO released the first teaser, which revealed that the series would premiere in 2016.

In November 2016, HBO renewed the series for a 10-episode second season, which premiered on April 22, 2018. On May 1, 2018, the series was renewed for a third season. Production of the third season started in April 2019. The eight-episode season premiered on March 15, 2020, HBO announced that it had renewed the show for a fourth season on April 22, 2020. In 2016, Entertainment Weekly reported that the writers and producers mapped out five seasons of Westworld. Later reports in The Hollywood Reporter speculated that the series might run for six seasons, but confirmed the continued involvement of Nolan and Joy after they signed a new deal with Amazon Studios. At the conclusion of the third season, Nolan clarified that he and Joy "have never actually talked about a number of seasons" adding, "Things change, circumstances change. I think when we sat down to do the show, we didn't quite realize how difficult it would be to make this show—how many years it would take per season... we had the plan [but] it didn't actually map out to a specific number of seasons, exactly. It was a beginning, a middle and an end." Nolan added that they were "looking at the rest of the story we have to tell" as the series was approaching its end, "but we haven't completely mapped it out". In October 2022, Jonathan Nolan spoke about the possibility of a fifth and also final season at the New York Comic Con, stating that they were in conversations with HBO.

On November 4, 2022, HBO announced the series was canceled, with the principal cast receiving their pay for the canceled season. Following the cancelation of the series, as part of cuts being made at Warner Bros. Discovery following their merger, the series was one of several removed from HBO Max in December 2022 to be shopped around to free ad-supported streaming networks. Nolan and Joy stated: "We've been privileged to tell these stories about the future of consciousness – both human and beyond – in the brief window of time before our AI overlords forbid us from doing so."

=== Writing and themes ===
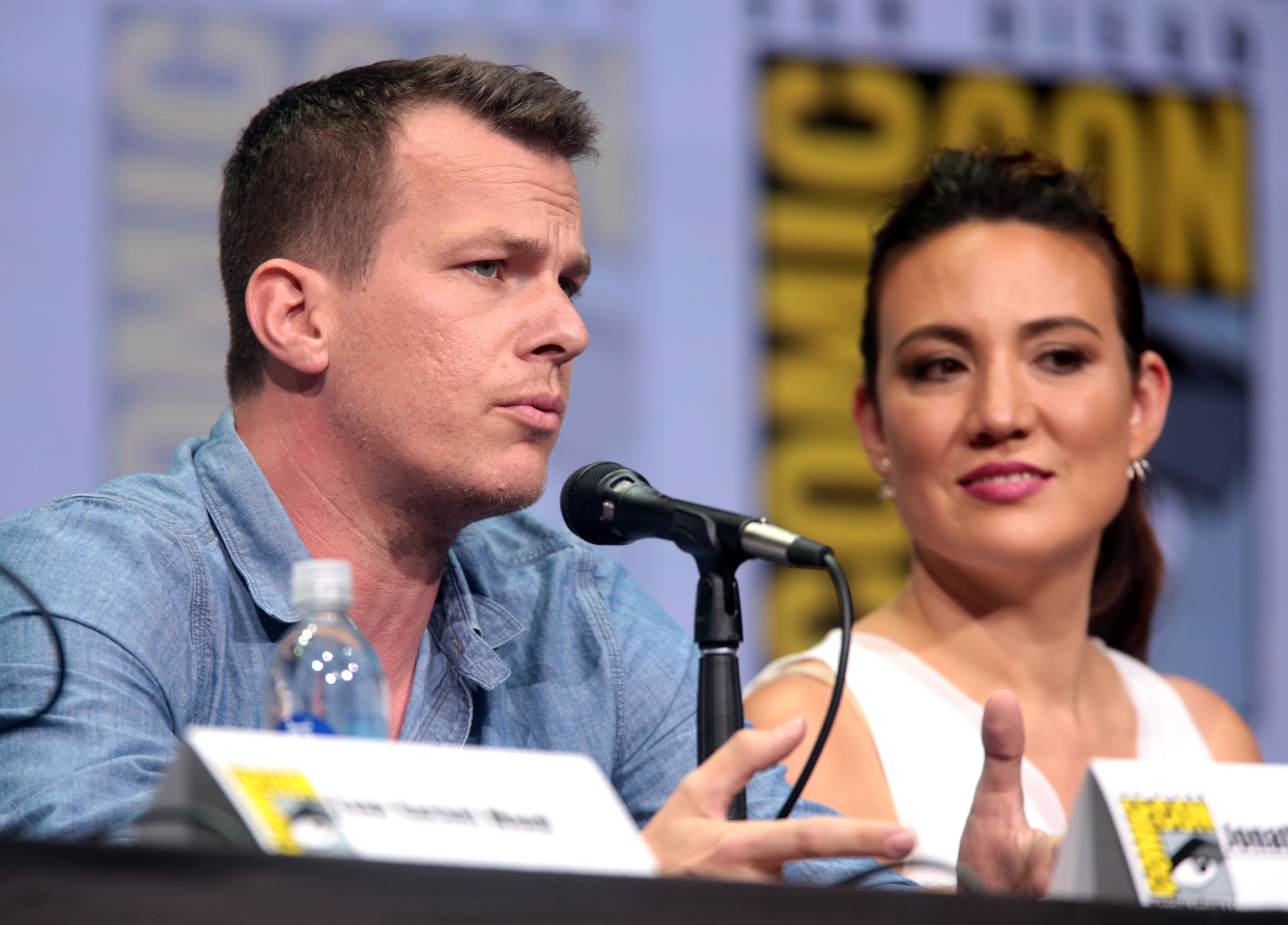
Co-creators Jonathan Nolan and Lisa Joy

Abrams suggested that the series be told with the perspective of the "hosts" in mind, and, Nolan said, "We took that suggestion and ran a country mile with it, up to and including and turning inside out the entire narrative where we could." Nolan took inspiration from video games like BioShock Infinite, Red Dead Redemption and The Elder Scrolls V: Skyrim where the writer must create a narrative 'in which the hero's moral component exists on a spectrum.' During research, the films of Sergio Leone provided the writers with reference points for the characters and visuals, and novels by Philip K. Dick informed them about dilemmas concerning artificial intelligence. For world-building and interlocking narrative, they consulted the Grand Theft Auto games. The idea that the data in the hosts' memories never really go away unless they are physically removed, came from Nolan's engineer uncle, who told him the NSA would triple overwrite hard-drives and then drill holes in them to make sure all the information was destroyed. The 1973 film also included a Roman World and Medieval World, but Nolan counted these out. Medieval elements were later included in a sword-and-sorcery fantasy-themed area known as Park Four, first shown in the episode titled "The Winter Line".

Nolan explained that, through its paying-guest characters, the series explored why "violence is in most of the stories we like to watch, but it isn't part of what we like to do". The autonomous existence of non-player characters in video games influenced the approach to the individual storylines in Westworld that are reset in a continuous loop. A recitation from Romeo and Juliet—"These violent delights have violent ends"—is used as a virus trigger within the hosts that alters how they perceive their existence. The series explores ideas about the bicameral mind hypothesized by psychologist Julian Jaynes, who argued separate functions for each half of the brain — a 'god' half who analyzed and synthesized language commands sent via neurons to the 'man' half who 'heard' the commands as external and obeyed automatically. Jaynes proposed that modern consciousness began when a new concept, 'self', entered language and began to integrate god's voice into man's thereby silencing the voices of the gods.

=== Casting ===
After the last episode of the first season was broadcast, Nolan and Joy revealed that they had operated on a strict "need-to-know" basis with most of the actors, in order to "keep the story as fresh and present for them as possible." For example, in Wood's case, they gave her strange acting directions without explaining why, and it took a while for Wood to deduce that she was actually playing five distinct characters within the same host: four different behavioral modes for Dolores and one for Wyatt. In contrast, Hopkins was made aware of Ford's general story arc at the time he was pitched the role, to ensure that he could fully convey the complexity of the character in his performance. Even with that foreknowledge, Hopkins was given heavily redacted scripts, and had to insist on being given access to complete scripts.

=== Filming ===
Early on it was decided that the series would be shot on 35mm film with assistance from HD taps. For a softer look, the filmmakers used Arri Zeiss master prime lenses with their coatings removed. The series was primarily shot on Kodak motion-picture film, which was processed by FotoKem in Burbank and scanned by Encore Hollywood to create digital intermediates of all takes suitable for use as dailies. The final cut was delivered to HBO in 2K JPEG digital format for broadcast and to Warner Bros. Television as a cut negative for archival purposes.

Since much of the series is seen from the hosts' point of view, Steadicams were used to film the entire first season, with exception of some scenes in the last episode, where a handheld camera was used as a metaphor for those hosts who broke free from their programming and acted of their own free will. Filming for the series' pilot episode took place during a 22-day period in August 2014 in and around Los Angeles, and in Moab, Utah.

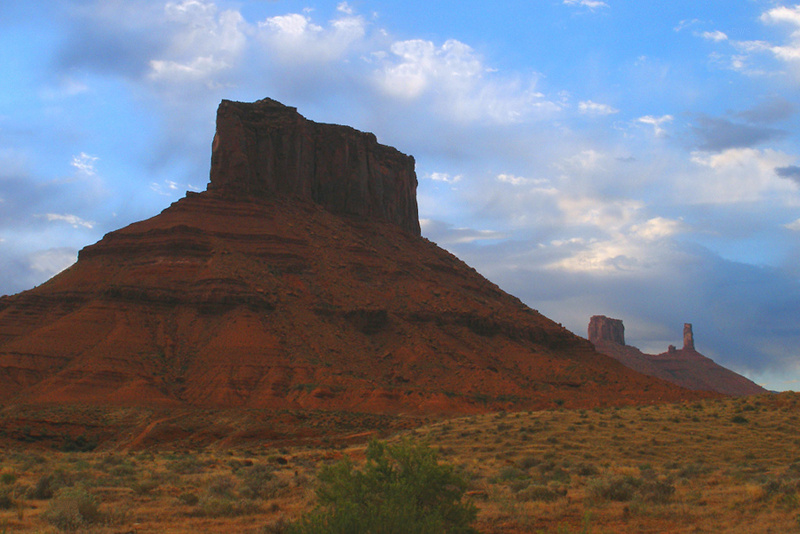
The series was partly shot in Castle Valley, east of Moab, Utah, where John Ford had made four Westerns.

Filming locations in California included various soundstages, backlots at both Universal Studios and Warner Bros., the Paramount Ranch in Agoura, the Melody Ranch in Santa Clarita, Big Sky Ranch, the Skirball Cultural Center and the Los Angeles Convention Center in Los Angeles, and the Pacific Design Center in West Hollywood. The Melody Ranch set used for the town of Sweetwater had been used previously for many Western films, including Django Unchained and The Magnificent Seven, as well as the HBO series Deadwood, but production designer Zack Grobler significantly upgraded the set for Westworld, in order to portray an idealized version of the American frontier. Green screens were placed around the California sets to block modern objects like parking lots, so that the California shots could be later merged digitally with exterior shots from Utah. For scenes showing the arrival of guests, the filmmakers were able to arrange with the Fillmore and Western Railway for the use of a small train originally built for the 2013 film The Lone Ranger. F&W also provided a few hundred feet of track on which to place the train. A pusher vehicle propelled the train into the Sweetwater set. The scenes in the underground laboratory levels of Westworld's operations center were filmed on a soundstage at Melody Ranch. The lab set used glass walls extensively, which meant the crew had to be vigilant to avoid walking through glass on the rather dark set, and they had to keep identifying and suppressing unwanted reflections. Hawthorne Plaza was used for filming the "cold storage" level where decommissioned hosts are kept.

For the series' large-scale exterior look, the producers drew inspiration from the work of John Ford, who shot four of his Western films in Castle Valley, east of Moab. In early 2014, Nolan visited southern Utah with key crew members and a location scout to explore the possibility of filming there, and promptly fell in love with the place. Location shooting for the pilot episode later occurred over five days in southern Utah, including Castle Valley. Most Utah locations, like Dead Horse Point State Park, were "walk-in" areas where both cast and crew were required to hike in and out with all their gear. Horseback riding scenes were filmed at a private ranch, where the filmmakers were not subject to as many restrictions as when working on public land. To seamlessly blend California sets with Utah scenery, set walls were shipped to Utah so that they could be used to film reverse angles of scenes originally filmed in California. For example, conversations on the exterior balcony of Westworld's operations center were shot on a balcony at the Skirball Center facing towards the center, then reverse angles over the shoulders of the cast members were shot at Dead Horse Point, to make it seem as if the operations center was located on top of the state park's steep cliffs. The train interior scenes were created by mounting the entire train car set on the back of a flatbed truck and driving the truck back and forth along Utah State Route 128.

The 3D printing of hosts was shot utilizing almost entirely practical effects, of which some were polished by the visual effects team. The series used real guns, although they were usually unloaded. Filming of nudity was conducted on a closed set, and for sex scenes, an intimacy coordinator was used.

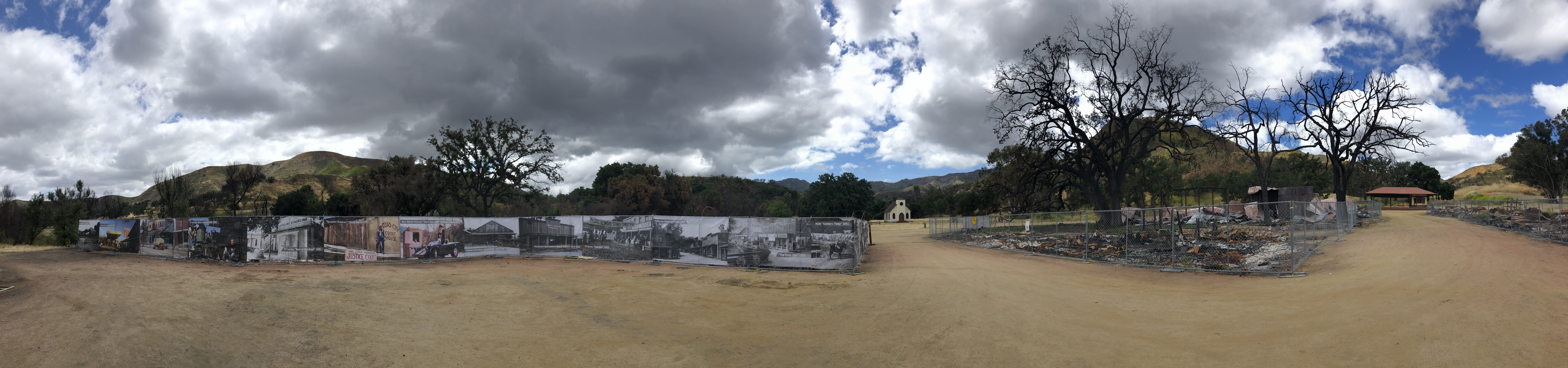
The Paramount Ranch following the Woolsey Fire and undergoing rebuilding in May 2019. The white church, central to Westworld season 1, remained standing.

In November 2018, some of the sets located at Paramount Ranch were destroyed by the Woolsey Fire. In July 2021, production on the fourth season was halted due to a positive COVID-19 case. In August 2021, it was reported that production on the fourth season had resumed at the Melody Ranch Studio in Newhall, CA. In an interview, actor Jeffrey Wright confirmed that filming for season four concluded in December 2021.

=== Design ===
==== Costumes ====
Costume designer Ane Crabtree approached her work by taking as inspiration the historical attire of the Wild West from the 1850s to the 1890s, as opposed to looking purely at Western films. Fabrics were custom-woven, dyed and printed for any actor with a speaking role, in order to capture the intricacies of the costumes (most of which were manufactured from scratch). Hat designs were the most challenging part of the process.

==== Title sequence ====
The series' title sequence was created by Elastic, a production studio that created the title sequences for three other HBO series: Rome, Carnivàle, and Game of Thrones. Patrick Clair acted as creative director for the title sequence, which took about five weeks to conceptualize.

Clair met with Nolan and Joy in February 2016. He was interested in their decision to approach the series' point of view from that of the hosts, creating a psychological study. The sequence translates elements present in the series via computer-aided design. For example, once Clair was sent footage by composer Ramin Djawadi of a player piano in motion, its actual counterpart, situated in the Westworld production office, was photographed and then reconstructed in computer-generated imagery. Nolan also applied the self-playing instrument as a reference to Kurt Vonnegut's first novel, Player Piano. It was meant to represent the first Rube Goldberg machine to evoke human motion. Clair saw the metaphor behind the player piano—"a primitive form of robot"—as an exploration into the disparity between man and machine "being created to be made redundant." Hosts that were bathed in white liquid struck Clair as a juxtaposition of the grit and grain of the Western genre with its basis in science fiction. Motifs of Leonardo da Vinci's Vitruvian Man came about from Clair's wish to convey Westworld's depiction of the naked human body. The sequence also refers to Chris Cunningham's 1999 music video for the Björk song "All Is Full of Love", in a way that Clair called "a bit shameless ... because I worship Chris Cunningham and ... it seemed like the perfect place to do it because it was dealing with all the right themes and all the right aesthetics."

The sequence commences with the rib cage of a horse, along with a set of hosts manufactured by industrial robots. The skeletal horse is shown in mid-gallop to subvert the iconography of such a depiction. As for Clair's efforts in exposing the Western landscapes in connection with a world of robotics, he thought it sensible that it be done inside a single eye; craters and valleys are formed as the simulacrum of an iris.

The second season introduces a new title sequence. Several elements from the original title sequence are changed, including the images of a horse, now replaced with a bison. Other new images in the title sequence include the Man in Black's black hat, a mother cradling her child (evocative of Maeve), and a blonde woman's hair being fabricated (representing Dolores). Ramin Djawadi's score stays the same, with the images of the player piano intact.

A new title sequence is introduced in the third season, which evokes more technological themes. The bison is now replaced with an eagle, which is flying into a plane engine slowly turning into a pink sun that is causing the eagle's skin to deteriorate. The background has also changed from the black-and-white colors to a brighter, more colorful tone. It also showcases orbs that form into the appearance of a city, the two reflections of a Host converging together and opening their robotic faces, and a drone Host being created and put into a bath of red liquid (presumably blood). Like the other sequences, this one continues to keep Djawadi's score and the piano player images, with the sole exception of the background being pink.

=== Music ===
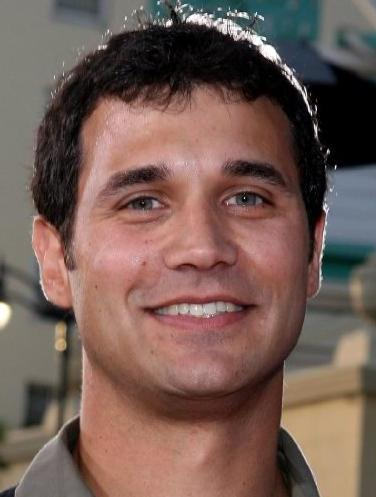
Ramin Djawadi composed original music for the series.

Original music for the series was composed by Ramin Djawadi, who also worked with showrunner Nolan on Person of Interest. The main theme blends the use of bass notes, light arpeggios and melody, all of which complement the idea of an amusement park. The first season soundtrack was released on December 5, 2016.

The series prominently features a number of re-workings of popular songs for player piano and strings, among them Kanye West's "Runaway", Radiohead's "No Surprises", "Fake Plastic Trees", "Motion Picture Soundtrack" and "Exit Music (For a Film)"; Soundgarden's "Black Hole Sun"; The Rolling Stones' "Paint It Black"; "Pine Apple Rag" and "Peacherine Rag" by Scott Joplin; Claude Debussy's "Reverie for piano, L.68"; "A Forest" by The Cure; The Animals' version of "The House of the Rising Sun"; Amy Winehouse's "Back to Black", and Nine Inch Nails' "Something I Can Never Have". Licensing costs ranged from $15,000 to $55,000.

Djawadi said of the series' use of modern songs: "Westworld has an anachronistic feel to it, it's a Western theme park, and yet it has robots in it, so why not have modern songs? And that's a metaphor in itself, wrapped up in the overall theme of the show", but credited Nolan with the idea.

== Release ==
=== Broadcast ===
The series premiered its ten-episode first season on October 2, 2016, in North America and Australia, and on October 4, 2016, in the UK and Ireland. The series is broadcast on HBO in the United States, on HBO Canada in Canada, on HBO Latin America in Latin America, in Australia on Fox Showcase, and in the UK and Ireland on Sky Atlantic. In New Zealand, the series is distributed by Sky's streaming service Neon.

The second episode was released on HBO in the U.S. on October 7—two days ahead of the episode's announced broadcast date—to avoid competing with the second U.S. presidential debate of 2016.

=== Marketing ===
Prior to the airing of Westworld, HBO held virtual reality exhibits at events like San Diego Comic-Con and Techcrunch Disrupt devoted to Westworld: A Delos Destination. Attendees were allowed to navigate the process by which guests would enter Westworld, and interact with the 3D environment. Made to run on the HTC Vive virtual reality headset, the piece was conceived by showrunners Nolan and Joy. It was designed using Unreal Engine 4, combining computer-generated content and live action 360-degree video. Users received a binary code, permitting access to the website DiscoverWestworld.com as part of a viral marketing campaign. Visitors were shown a trailer of a fictional travel site, leading them to order a trip to Westworld. A chatbot featured on the website, named Aeden, is available as a Google Assistant action on the smart speaker Google Home.

In March 2018, to promote Westworld's second season, HBO constructed a real-life replica of the show's fictional Western "town" of Sweetwater during South by Southwest, built on two acres of open land just outside Austin, Texas. Fans took shuttles to the site, which was dressed in the Old West style, with over 60 actors playing the parts of the android "hosts".

At the Consumer Electronics Show in January 2020, prior to the third season, HBO held a special event hosted by "Incite", the fictional company to be introduced in the third season, with "hosts" attending the invited guests' needs.

=== Home media ===
The first season of Westworld (subtitled The Maze) was released on Blu-ray, DVD, and 4K Ultra HD Blu-ray on November 7, 2017. It was the first scripted TV series to be released on 4K Blu-ray in the United States. The second season was released on Blu-ray, DVD, and 4K Blu-ray on December 4, 2018. The third season was released on Blu-ray, DVD, and 4K Blu-ray on November 17, 2020. The fourth season was released on Blu-ray, DVD, and 4K Blu-ray on November 29, 2022.

== Reception ==
=== Critical response ===
Critical response of Westworld
Season	Rotten Tomatoes	Metacritic
1	87% (384 reviews)	74 (43 reviews)
2	86% (469 reviews)	76 (29 reviews)
3	73% (223 reviews)	64 (23 reviews)
4	75% (57 reviews)	64 (18 reviews)

==== Season 1 ====
The first season was acclaimed, with particular praise for its visuals, story, world-building, themes, and acting. On review aggregation website Rotten Tomatoes, the first season has an approval rating of 87% based on 384 reviews, with an average rating of 8.15/10. The site's consensus reads "With an impressive level of quality that honors its source material, the brilliantly addictive Westworld balances intelligent, enthralling drama against outright insanity." On Metacritic, the first season has a score of 74 out of 100, based on reviews from 43 critics, indicating "generally favorable reviews".

The editors of TV Guide placed Westworld fifth among the top ten picks for the most anticipated new shows of the 2016–17 season. In writer Tim Surette's overall review, he notes the perfect concept of blending the Western premise into a futuristic setting, saying, "Well, Westworld has both, ensuring that it will be an exciting mashup of genres that will disrupt a television landscape that typically says we can only have one or the other." He also added, "The look of the show and its fine cast swing open the saloon doors, but the real treat will be the intelligent discussion of whether or not robots will eventually kill us all. Thankfully, creator Jonathan Nolan already showed us he's the go-to guy for A.I. with Person of Interest." Mary McNamara of Los Angeles Times wrote in a laudatory review, "It isn't just great television, it's vivid, thought-provoking television that entertains even as it examines the darker side of entertainment." For the San Francisco Chronicle, David Wiegand wrote, "Westworld isn't easy to understand at first, but you will be hooked nonetheless by unusually intelligent storytelling, powerful visuals and exceptionally nuanced performances." Time's chief critic Daniel D'Addario wrote, "Its carefully chosen details add up to a pulp spectacular that's more thoughtful than any other of this fall's new dramas."

Jeff Jensen of Entertainment Weekly also lauded the series and said, "The depth of Westworld lies not in asking questions about memory, free will, and what makes us human, but in whether we can become more human than what we let ourselves to be, whether our stories can be richer and more meaningful than what the culture allows." Matthew Gilbert of The Boston Globe quipped, "Westworld has fewer heroes than Game of Thrones, which makes it a bit harder to warm up to, but like a good, thought-provoking puzzle, it is compelling and addictive." In a brief review from The Hollywood Reporter, Tim Goodman said, "Where Westworld is at its best is in the deeper issues that will unspool slowly, like a good mystery. Early episodes are adept at getting at the base attractions of the park and why people would come, but also in setting up a sense of confusion about motives. ... The series benefits from a number of standout performances." Robert Bianco of USA Today wrote, "The reward, beyond the visual splendors you've come to expect from big-budget HBO productions, is a set of characters who grow ever more complex." Several other publications wrote positive reviews, including Indiewire, The A.V. Club, RogerEbert.com, The New Yorker, and The Atlantic.

In a mixed review for The New York Times, chief critic James Poniewozik said, "It's an ambitious, if not entirely coherent, sci-fi shoot-'em-up that questions nihilistic entertainment impulses while indulging them." Hank Stuever of The Washington Post also joins Poniewozik saying, "I'm ... hesitant to write Westworld off as a dreary trot from start to finish; parts of it are as imaginative and intriguing as anything that's been on TV recently, particularly in the sci-fi realm," and further said, "It's definitely not the cyborg Deadwood, that some HBO fans were actively wishing for, nor does it roll out the welcome mat as a riveting, accessible adventure." Chief journalist Rob Owen of Pittsburgh Post-Gazette critiqued the series less favorably saying, "It is the definition of a slow-burn series, a program that should be exciting rendered as kind of dull." In a less enthusiastic review for Variety, Maureen Ryan said, "Westworld looks terrific; its directors have shot its Western locations to stunning effect. But its warmly saturated outdoor scenes and its surface slickness aren't enough to mask the indecision, condescension, and hollowness at its core."

==== Season 2 ====
The second season also received positive reviews from critics, with praise for the performances, visuals, its soundtrack, and themes. Adversely, the plot and narrative was criticized for being confusing and inconsistent. On Rotten Tomatoes, the season has an approval rating of 86% based on 469 reviews, with an average rating of 7.9/10. The site's consensus reads "Westworld builds on its experimental first season, diving deeper into the human side of AI without losing any of its stylish, bloody glory." On Metacritic, the season has a score of 76 out of 100, based on reviews from 29 critics, indicating "generally favorable reviews".

In April 2018, after the second-season premiere, Variety published an article concerning the series' complicated narrative. Andrew Wallenstein wrote, "Westworld seems to have too much faith viewers will be willing to absorb storylines that can border on the incomprehensible." He also commented about the possible future success of the series, stating, "There will be a very vocal core fan base willing to do the homework of piecing together the show's many mysteries, but that's not broad enough a base to be the kind of flagship series HBO wants." At the press tour of the Television Critics Association, when the president of HBO programming Casey Bloys was asked about the complexity of the series and the negative response it had generated, he admitted that Westworld is not for "casual viewers".

==== Season 3 ====
The third season received a positive reception from critics, though reviews became more mixed during the second half. While the visuals, acting, score, and setting expansion were praised, the script, dialogue, pacing, and narrative received polarizing responses; the plot was considered barely possible to understand, with many believing Westworld had departed too far from the main plot. On Rotten Tomatoes, the season has an approval rating of 73% based on 223 reviews, with an average rating of 7.05/10. The site's critics consensus reads: "Westworld succeeds in rebooting itself by broadening its scope beyond the titular amusement park while tightening its storytelling clarity – although some may feel that the soul has been stripped from this machine in the process." On Metacritic, the season has a weighted average score of 64 out of 100, based on reviews from 23 critics, indicating "generally favorable reviews".

CNN's Brian Lowry wrote that "the show has become increasingly incomprehensible, at least for anyone not willing to put in the work trying to remember all the assorted connections, further complicated by the fact that dying in Westworld is often not a permanent state of affairs, amid the questions about who's truly human and who actually isn't." Writing for Entertainment Weekly, Kristen Baldwin gave the series a "B−" and said: "After spending three seasons struggling through maddeningly complicated time-loops, it's time the writers let Dolores, Maeve, and Bernard control-alt-delete themselves", while Darren Franich wrote that series had "lost its way" and gave the season a "C". Reviewing the season finale for IndieWire, Ben Travers said: "Season 3 made a point of stripping away the rest of Westworld's building blocks: The park? Left behind. The maze? Gone. But the moral questions meant to keep you invested in the characters largely disappear, too. Season 3 doesn't bother developing its characters because it refuses to let them question the nature of their own reality."

==== Season 4 ====
The fourth season received mixed reviews, with praise for the performances, soundtrack, and visuals, but criticism for the script and its incomprehensible plot. A mere few critics found it a slight improvement to the third season. On Rotten Tomatoes, the season has an approval rating of 75% based on 57 reviews, with an average rating of 5.9/10. The website's critical consensus reads: "Westworld's continued reliance on mystery will frustrate just as much as it intrigues, but this fourth season still offers plenty of gleaming and menacing insight into a brave new world." Metacritic assigned a score of 64 out of 100 based on 18 critics, indicating "generally favorable reviews".

=== Ratings ===
The series premiere had viewership numbers slightly less than those for True Detective, but much better than Vinyl, meaning that it was seen as "...off to a relatively promising start." The U.S. series premiere attracted 1.96 million viewers, with 0.8 million in the advertiser-coveted 18-to-49-year-old demographic. The premiere episode received 3.3 million viewers for its three Sunday night airings as well as on HBO's streaming platforms. The season one finale received 2.2 million viewers for its initial broadcast, and increased to 3.5 million including replays and on-demand viewing. The first season had an average cumulative viewership of 12 million viewers, making it the most-watched first season of an HBO series, and TorrentFreak gauged Westworld as the third-most-torrented television show of 2016.

Westworld : U.S. viewers per episode (millions)

Season	Episode number										Average
Season	1	2	3	4	5	6	7	8	9	10	Average
1	1.96	1.50	2.10	1.70	1.49	1.64	1.75	1.78	2.09	2.24	1.82
2	2.06	1.85	1.63	1.59	1.55	1.11	1.39	1.44	1.56	1.56	1.57
3	0.90	0.78	0.80	0.78	0.77	0.77	0.81	0.89	–		0.81
4	0.33	0.35	0.31	0.31	0.38	0.39	0.32	0.39	–		0.35

Audience measurement performed by Nielsen Media Research
