= 22nd Critics' Choice Awards =

2016 US film awards

- Date: December 11, 2016
- Site: Barker Hangar, Santa Monica, California, United States
- Hosted by: T.J. Miller

Highlights
- Most awards: Film: La La Land (8); Television: The People v. O. J. Simpson: American Crime Story (4)
- Most nominations: Film: La La Land (12); Television: Game of Thrones / The People v. O. J. Simpson: American Crime Story (6)
- Best Picture: La La Land
- Best Comedy Series: Silicon Valley
- Best Drama Series: Game of Thrones
- Best Movie Made for Television or Limited Series: The People v. O. J. Simpson: American Crime Story
- Best Animated Series: BoJack Horseman
- Website: www.criticschoice.com

Television/radio coverage
- Network: A&E

The 22nd Critics' Choice Awards were presented on December 11, 2016, at the Barker Hangar at the Santa Monica Airport, honoring the finest achievements of filmmaking and television programming in 2016. The ceremony was broadcast on A&E and T.J. Miller returned to host for the second consecutive time. The television nominations were announced on November 14, 2016, while the film nominations were announced on December 1, 2016. HBO led the nominations for television with 22, followed by ABC and Netflix with 12 each. The People v. O. J. Simpson: American Crime Story won four awards, becoming the biggest TV winner of the night, followed by Anthony Bourdain: Parts Unknown, Saturday Night Live and Westworld with two wins each.

This year's ceremony date was moved to December from its usual January slot. The move came in hopes to get ahead of the 74th Golden Globe Awards on NBC. However, the following ceremony returned to its traditional January date in 2018.

Viola Davis received the first-ever #SeeHer Award, an honor that recognizes her work furthering the portrayal of three-dimensional women onscreen in 2016. The award is presented by the Association of National Advertisers in conjunction with A&E Networks.

== Winners and nominees ==
=== Film ===
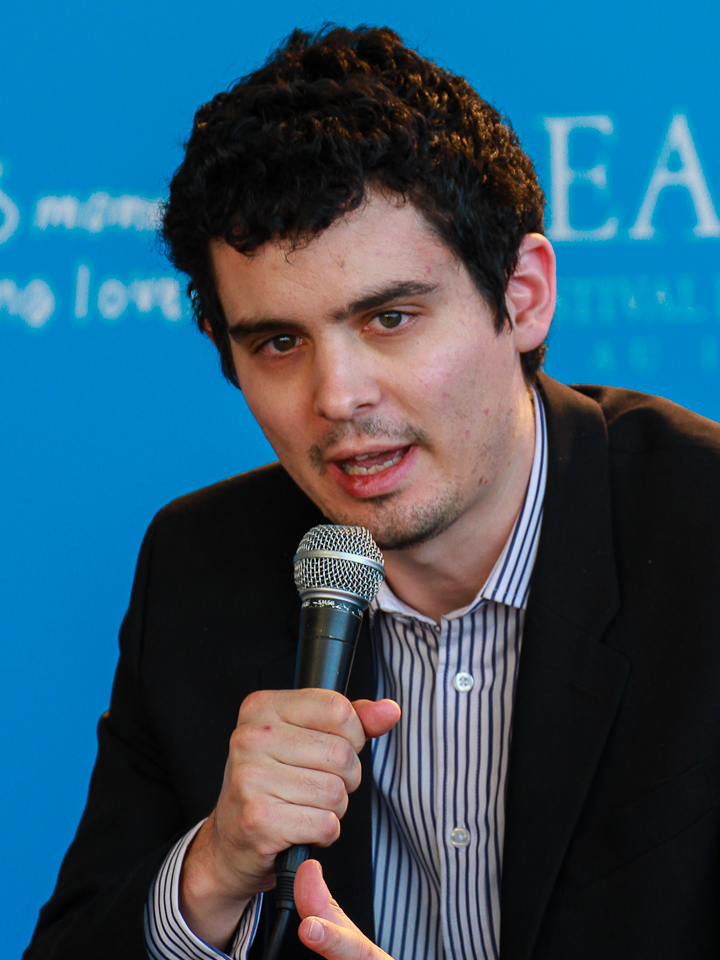
Damien Chazelle, Best Director winner and Best Original Screenplay co-winner

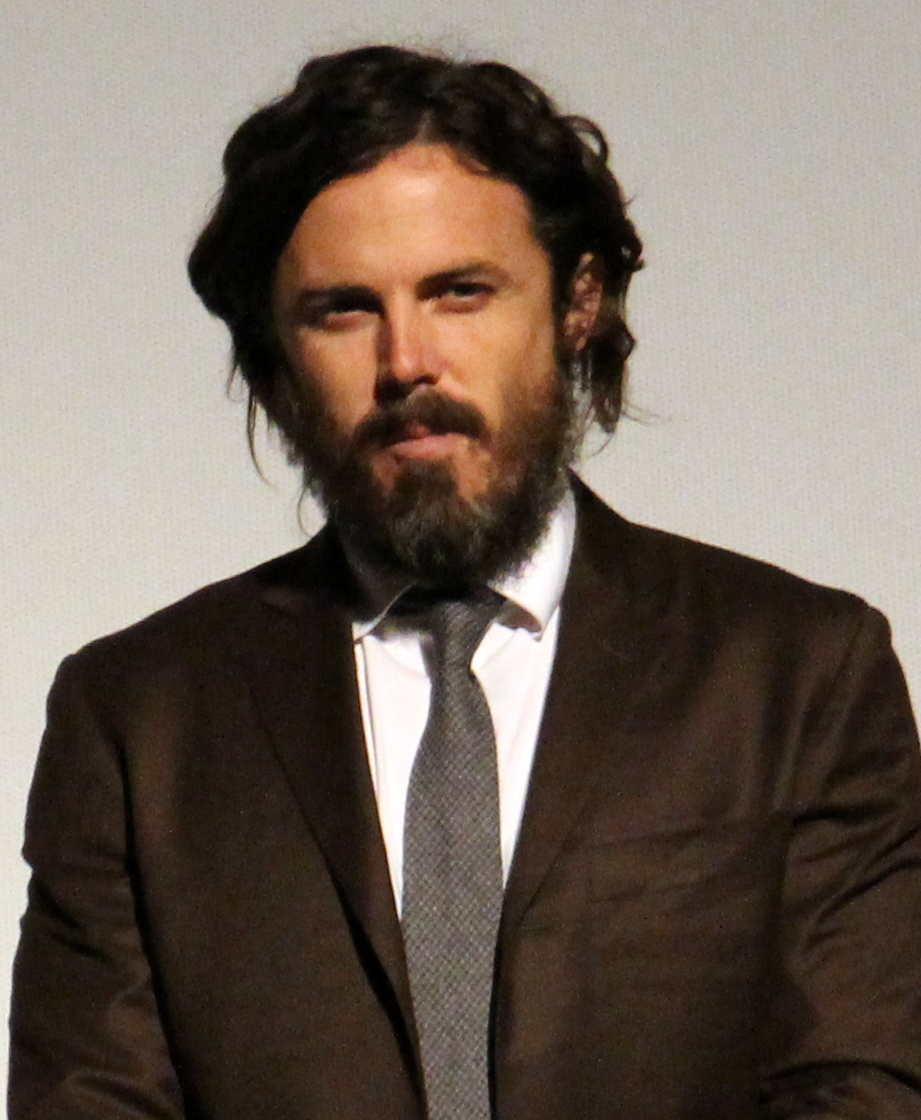
Casey Affleck, Best Actor winner

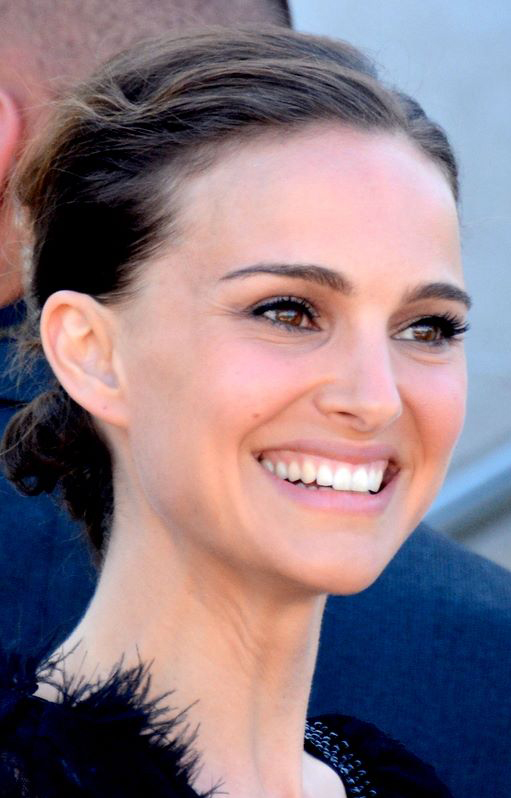
Natalie Portman, Best Actress winner

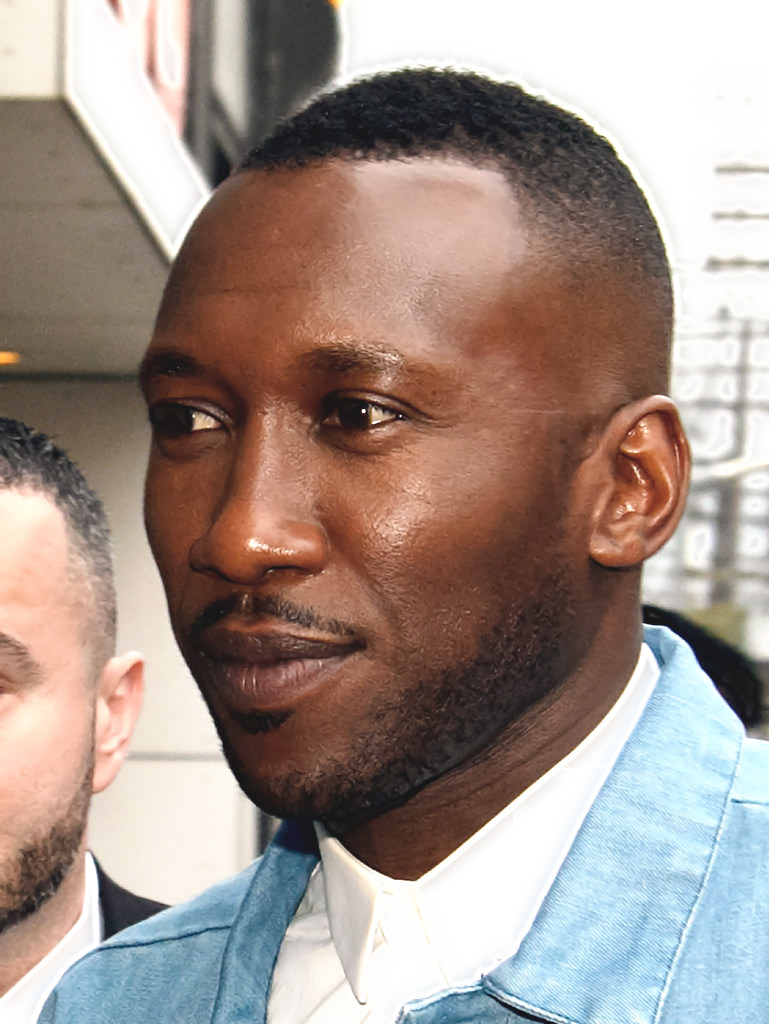
Mahershala Ali, Best Supporting Actor winner

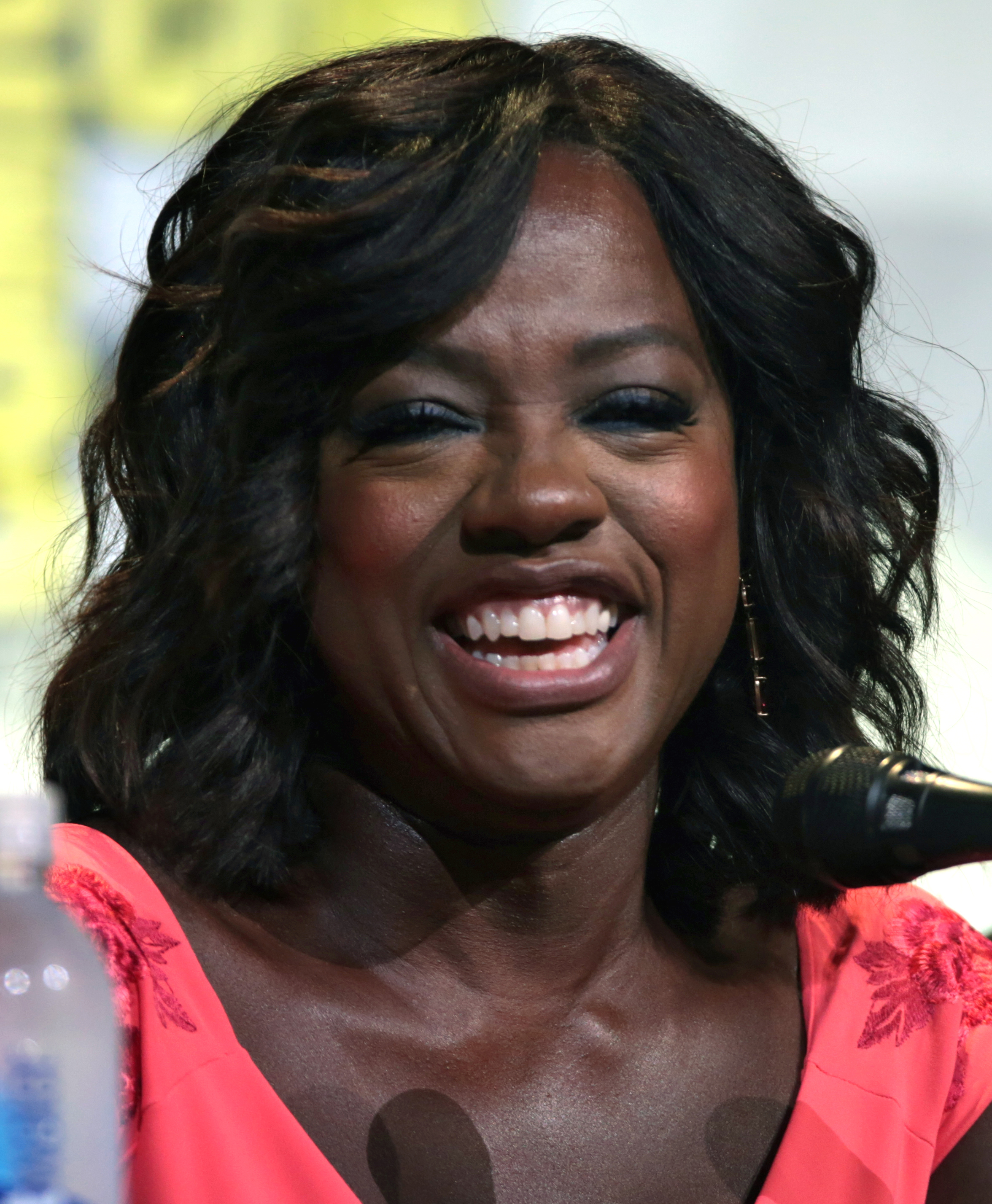
Viola Davis, Best Supporting Actress winner

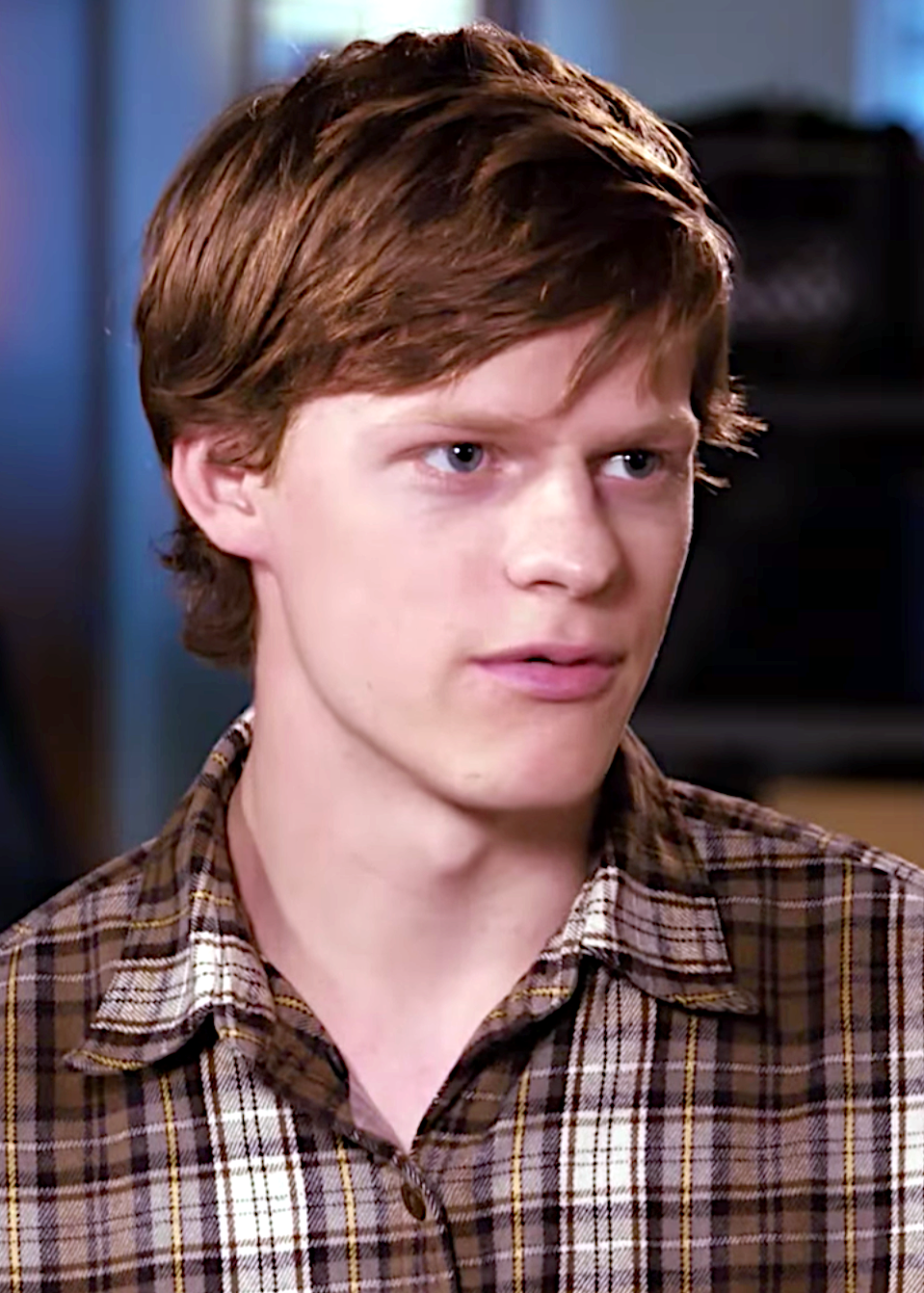
Lucas Hedges, Best Young Actor/Actress winner

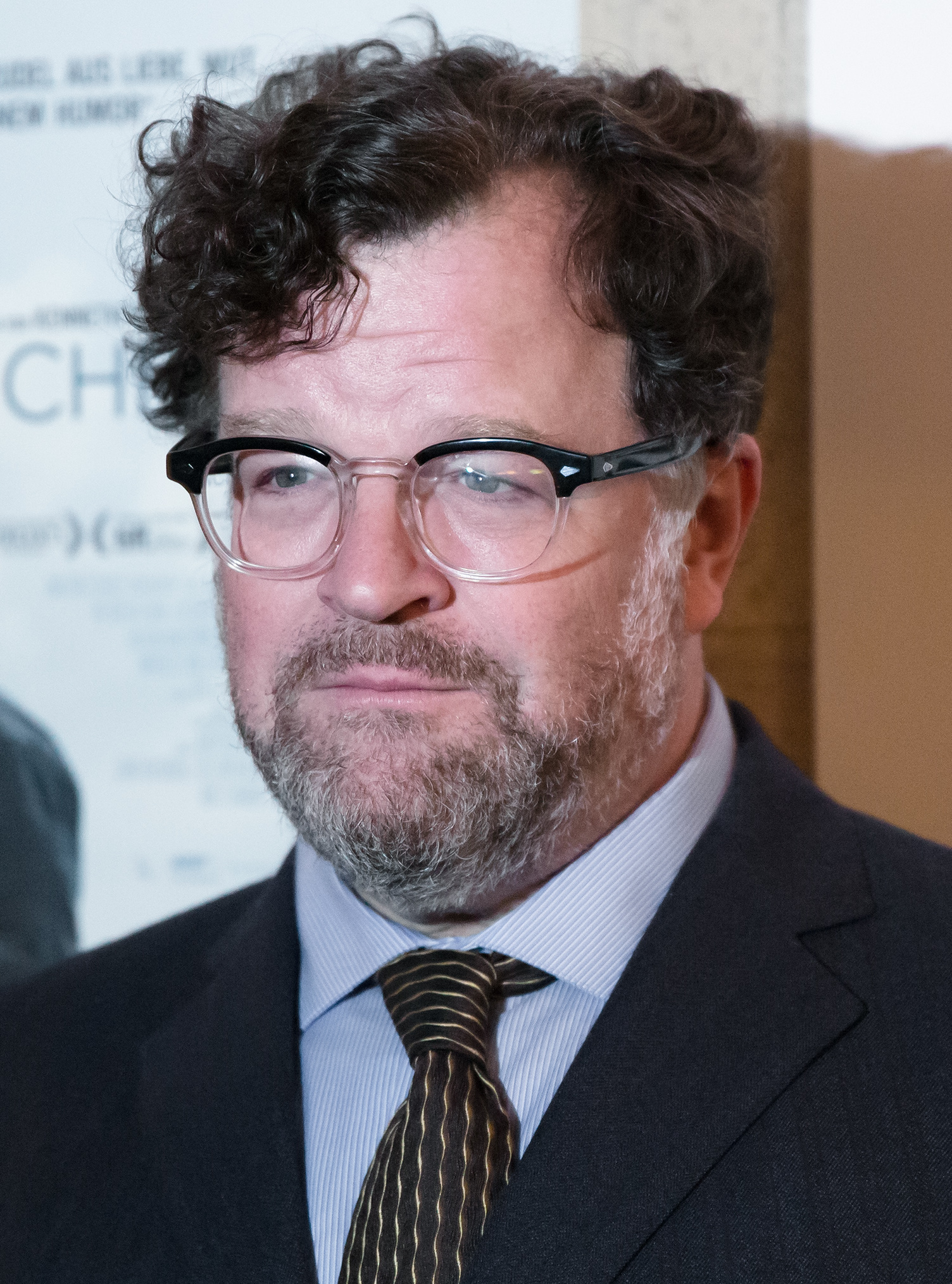
Kenneth Lonergan, Best Original Screenplay co-winner

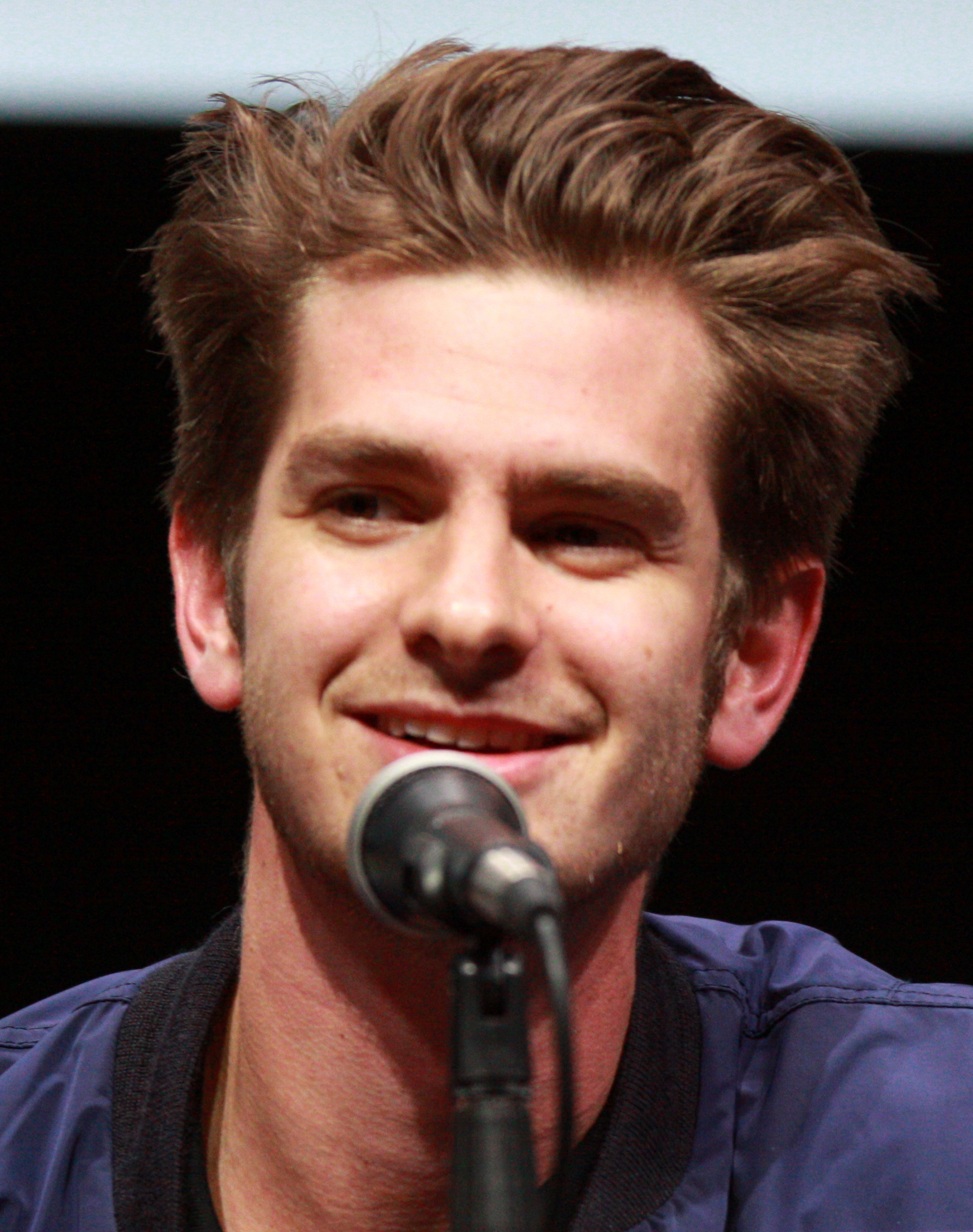
Andrew Garfield, Best Actor in an Action Movie winner

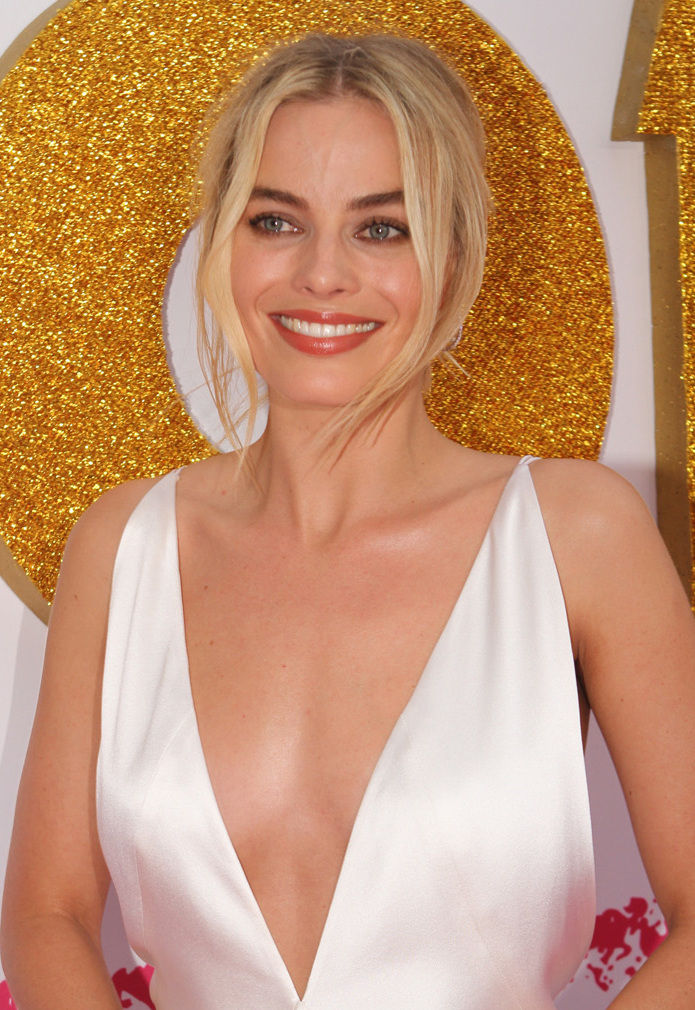
Margot Robbie, Best Actress in an Action Movie winner

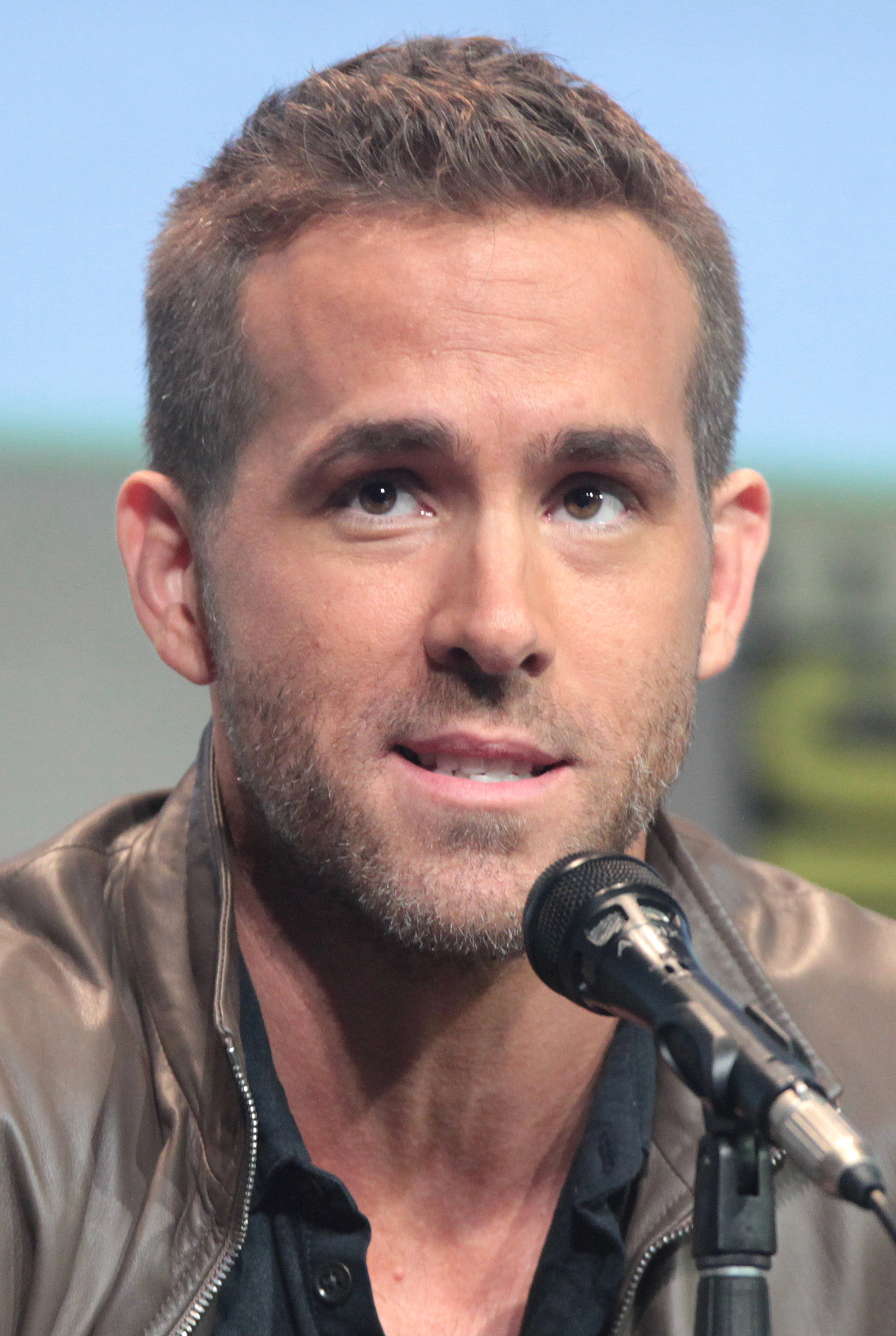
Ryan Reynolds, Best Actor in a Comedy Movie winner

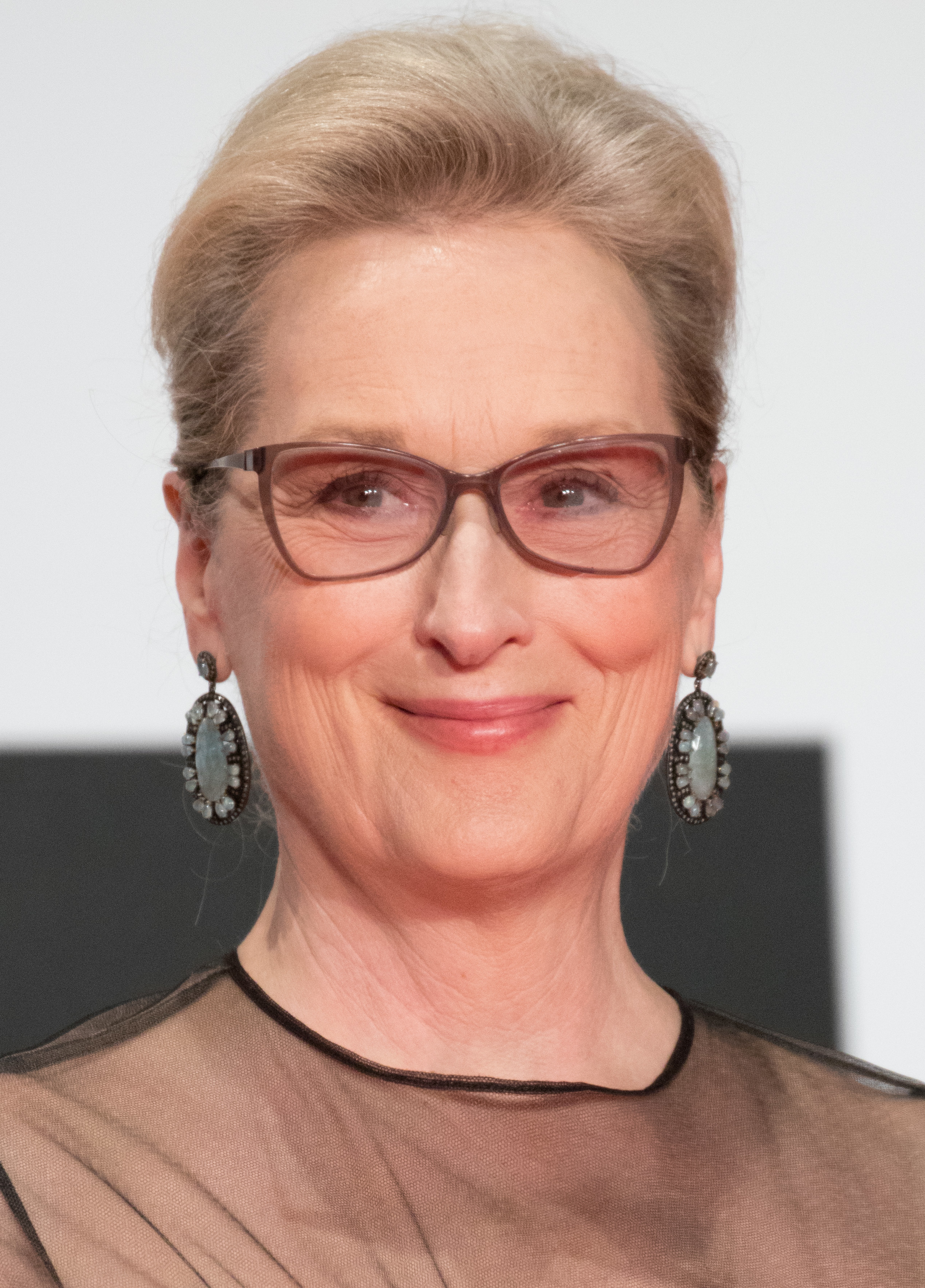
Meryl Streep, Best Actress in a Comedy Movie winner

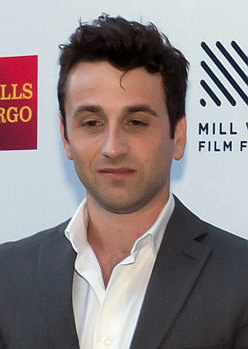
Justin Hurwitz, Best Score winner

| Best Picture La La Land: Arrival; Fences; Hacksaw Ridge; Hell or High Water; Lion; Loving; Manchester by the Sea; Moonlight; Sully | Best Director Damien Chazelle – La La Land: Mel Gibson – Hacksaw Ridge; Barry Jenkins – Moonlight; Kenneth Lonergan – Manchester by the Sea; David Mackenzie – Hell or High Water; Denis Villeneuve – Arrival; Denzel Washington – Fences |
| Best Actor Casey Affleck – Manchester by the Sea as Lee Chandler: Joel Edgerton – Loving as Richard Loving; Andrew Garfield – Hacksaw Ridge as Desmond Doss; Ryan Gosling – La La Land as Sebastian Wilder; Tom Hanks – Sully as Chesley "Sully" Sullenberger; Denzel Washington – Fences as Troy Maxson | Best Actress Natalie Portman – Jackie as Jackie Kennedy: Amy Adams – Arrival as Dr. Louise Banks; Annette Bening – 20th Century Women as Dorothea Fields; Isabelle Huppert – Elle as Michèle LeBlanc; Ruth Negga – Loving as Mildred Loving; Emma Stone – La La Land as Mia Dolan |
| Best Supporting Actor Mahershala Ali – Moonlight as Juan: Jeff Bridges – Hell or High Water as Marcus Hamilton; Ben Foster – Hell or High Water as Tanner Howard; Lucas Hedges – Manchester by the Sea as Patrick Chandler; Dev Patel – Lion as Saroo Brierley; Michael Shannon – Nocturnal Animals as Detective Bobby Andes | Best Supporting Actress Viola Davis – Fences as Rose Maxson: Greta Gerwig – 20th Century Women as Abbie Porter; Naomie Harris – Moonlight as Paula; Nicole Kidman – Lion as Sue Brierley; Janelle Monáe – Hidden Figures as Mary Jackson; Michelle Williams – Manchester by the Sea as Randi Chandler |
| Best Young Actor/Actress Lucas Hedges – Manchester by the Sea as Patrick Chandler: Alex R. Hibbert – Moonlight as Child Chiron / "Little"; Lewis MacDougall – A Monster Calls as Conor O'Malley; Madina Nalwanga – Queen of Katwe as Phiona Mutesi; Sunny Pawar – Lion as Young Saroo; Hailee Steinfeld – The Edge of Seventeen as Nadine Franklin | Best Acting Ensemble Moonlight: 20th Century Women; Fences; Hell or High Water; Hidden Figures; Manchester by the Sea |
| Best Original Screenplay Damien Chazelle – La La Land (TIE); Kenneth Lonergan – Manchester by the Sea (TIE): Efthimis Filippou and Yorgos Lanthimos – The Lobster; Barry Jenkins – Moonlight; Jeff Nichols – Loving; Taylor Sheridan – Hell or High Water | Best Adapted Screenplay Eric Heisserer – Arrival: Luke Davies – Lion; Tom Ford – Nocturnal Animals; Todd Komarnicki – Sully; Theodore Melfi and Allison Schroeder – Hidden Figures; August Wilson – Fences |
| Best Animated Feature Zootopia: Finding Dory; Kubo and the Two Strings; Moana; The Red Turtle; Trolls | Best Foreign Language Film Elle • France / Germany: The Handmaiden (Ah-ga-ssi) • Korea; Julieta • Spain; Neruda • Chile; The Salesman (Forušande) • France / Iran; Toni Erdmann • Austria / Germany |
Best Action Movie Hacksaw Ridge: Captain America: Civil War; Deadpool; Doctor Strange; Jason Bourne
| Best Actor in an Action Movie Andrew Garfield – Hacksaw Ridge as Desmond Doss: Benedict Cumberbatch – Doctor Strange as Dr. Stephen Strange; Matt Damon – Jason Bourne as Jason Bourne; Chris Evans – Captain America: Civil War as Steve Rogers / Captain America; Ryan Reynolds – Deadpool as Wade Wilson / Deadpool | Best Actress in an Action Movie Margot Robbie – Suicide Squad as Dr. Harleen Quinzel / Harley Quinn: Gal Gadot – Batman v Superman: Dawn of Justice as Diana Prince / Wonder Woman; Scarlett Johansson – Captain America: Civil War as Natasha Romanoff / Black Widow; Tilda Swinton – Doctor Strange as The Ancient One |
Best Comedy Movie Deadpool: Central Intelligence; Don't Think Twice; The Edge of Seventeen; Hail, Caesar!; The Nice Guys
| Best Actor in a Comedy Movie Ryan Reynolds – Deadpool as Wade Wilson / Deadpool: Ryan Gosling – The Nice Guys as Holland March; Hugh Grant – Florence Foster Jenkins as St. Clair Bayfield; Dwayne Johnson – Central Intelligence as Bob Stone / Robbie Wheirdicht; Viggo Mortensen – Captain Fantastic as Ben Cash | Best Actress in a Comedy Movie Meryl Streep – Florence Foster Jenkins as Florence Foster Jenkins: Kate Beckinsale – Love & Friendship as Lady Susan Vernon; Sally Field – Hello, My Name Is Doris as Doris Miller; Kate McKinnon – Ghostbusters as Dr. Jillian "Holtz" Holtzmann; Hailee Steinfeld – The Edge of Seventeen as Nadine Franklin |
Best Sci-Fi/Horror Movie Arrival: 10 Cloverfield Lane; Doctor Strange; Don't Breathe; Star Trek Beyond; The Witch
| Best Art Direction David Wasco and Sandy Reynolds-Wasco – La La Land: Stuart Craig, James Hambidge, and Anna Pinnock – Fantastic Beasts and Where to Find Them; Jess Gonchor and Nancy Haigh – Live by Night; Paul Hotte, André Valade, and Patrice Vermette – Arrival; Véronique Melery and Jean Rabasse – Jackie | Best Cinematography Linus Sandgren – La La Land: Stéphane Fontaine – Jackie; James Laxton – Moonlight; Seamus McGarvey – Nocturnal Animals; Bradford Young – Arrival |
| Best Costume Design Madeline Fontaine – Jackie: Colleen Atwood – Fantastic Beasts and Where to Find Them; Consolata Boyle – Florence Foster Jenkins; Joanna Johnston – Allied; Eimer Ní Mhaoldomhnaigh – Love & Friendship; Mary Zophres – La La Land | Best Editing Tom Cross – La La Land: John Gilbert – Hacksaw Ridge; Blu Murray – Sully; Nat Sanders and Joi McMillon – Moonlight; Joe Walker – Arrival |
| Best Score Justin Hurwitz – La La Land: Nicholas Britell – Moonlight; Jóhann Jóhannsson – Arrival; Mica Levi – Jackie; Dustin O'Halloran and Hauschka – Lion | Best Song "City of Stars" – La La Land: "Audition (The Fools Who Dream)" – La La Land; "Can't Stop the Feeling!" – Trolls; "Drive It Like You Stole It" – Sing Street; "How Far I'll Go" – Moana; "The Rules Don't Apply" – Rules Don't Apply |
| Best Hair and Makeup Jackie: Doctor Strange; Fantastic Beasts and Where to Find Them; Hacksaw Ridge; Star Trek Beyond | Best Visual Effects The Jungle Book: Arrival; Doctor Strange; Fantastic Beasts and Where to Find Them; A Monster Calls |

=== Television ===
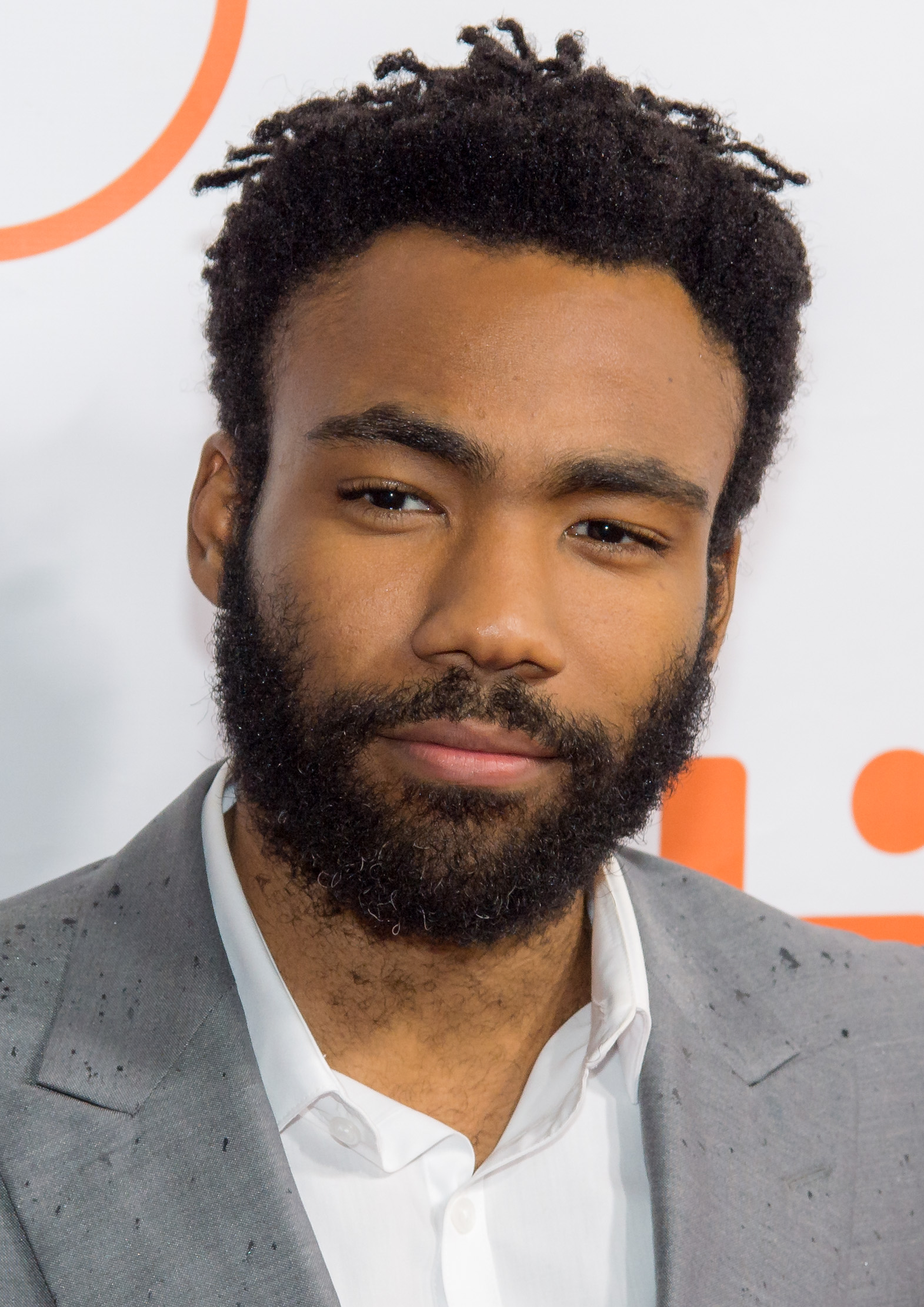
Donald Glover, Best Actor in a Comedy Series winner

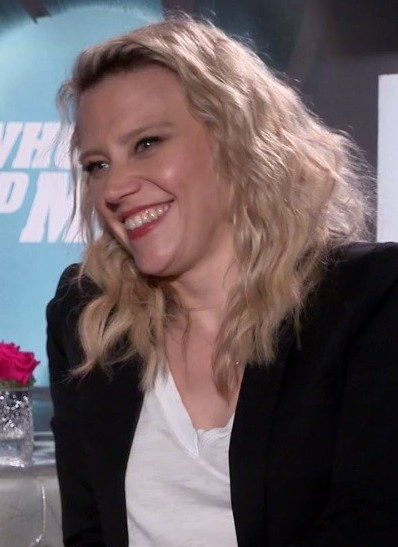
Kate McKinnon, Best Actress in a Comedy Series winner

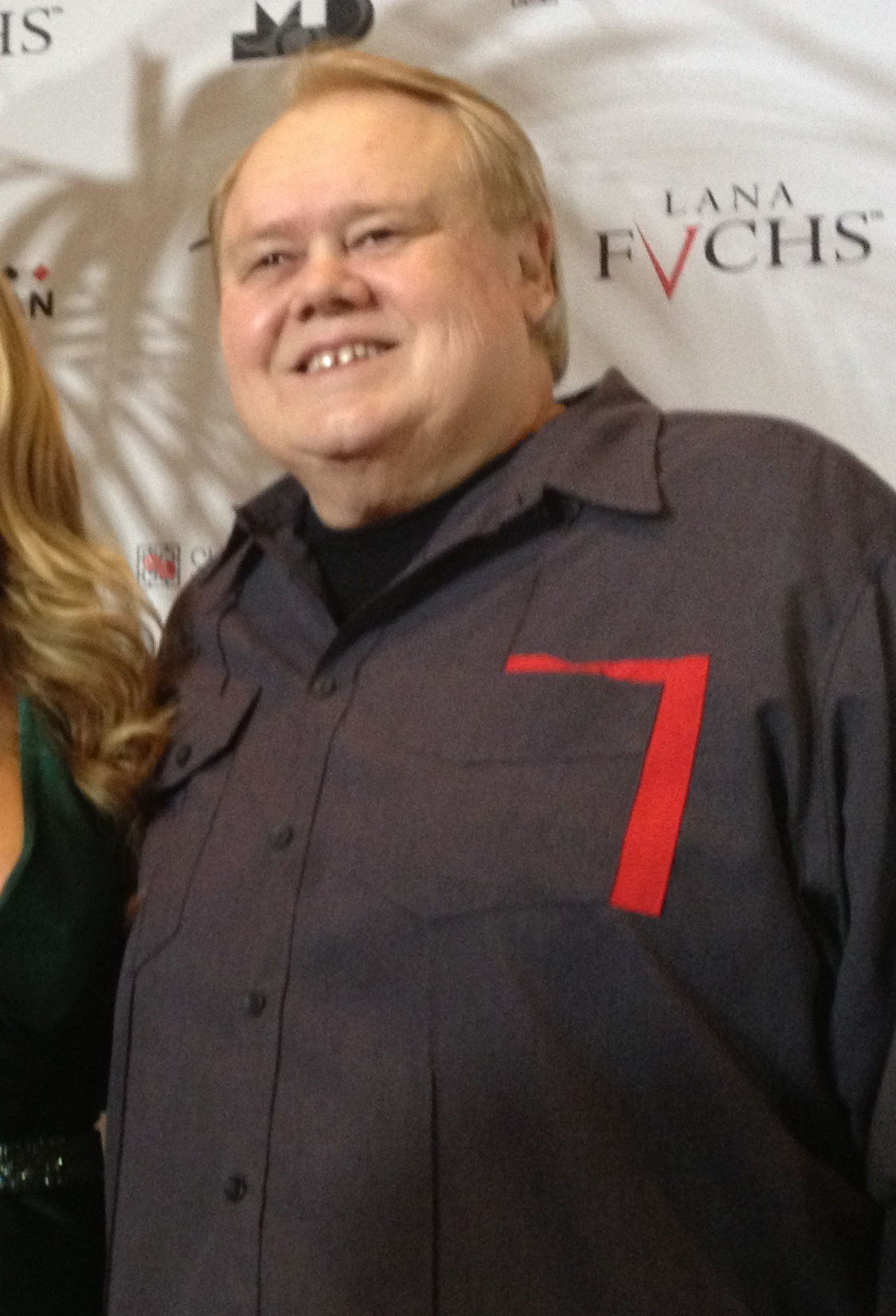
Louie Anderson, Best Supporting Actor in a Comedy Series winner

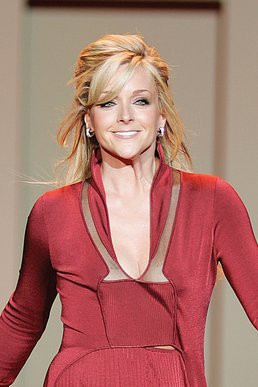
Jane Krakowski, Best Supporting Actress in a Comedy Series winner

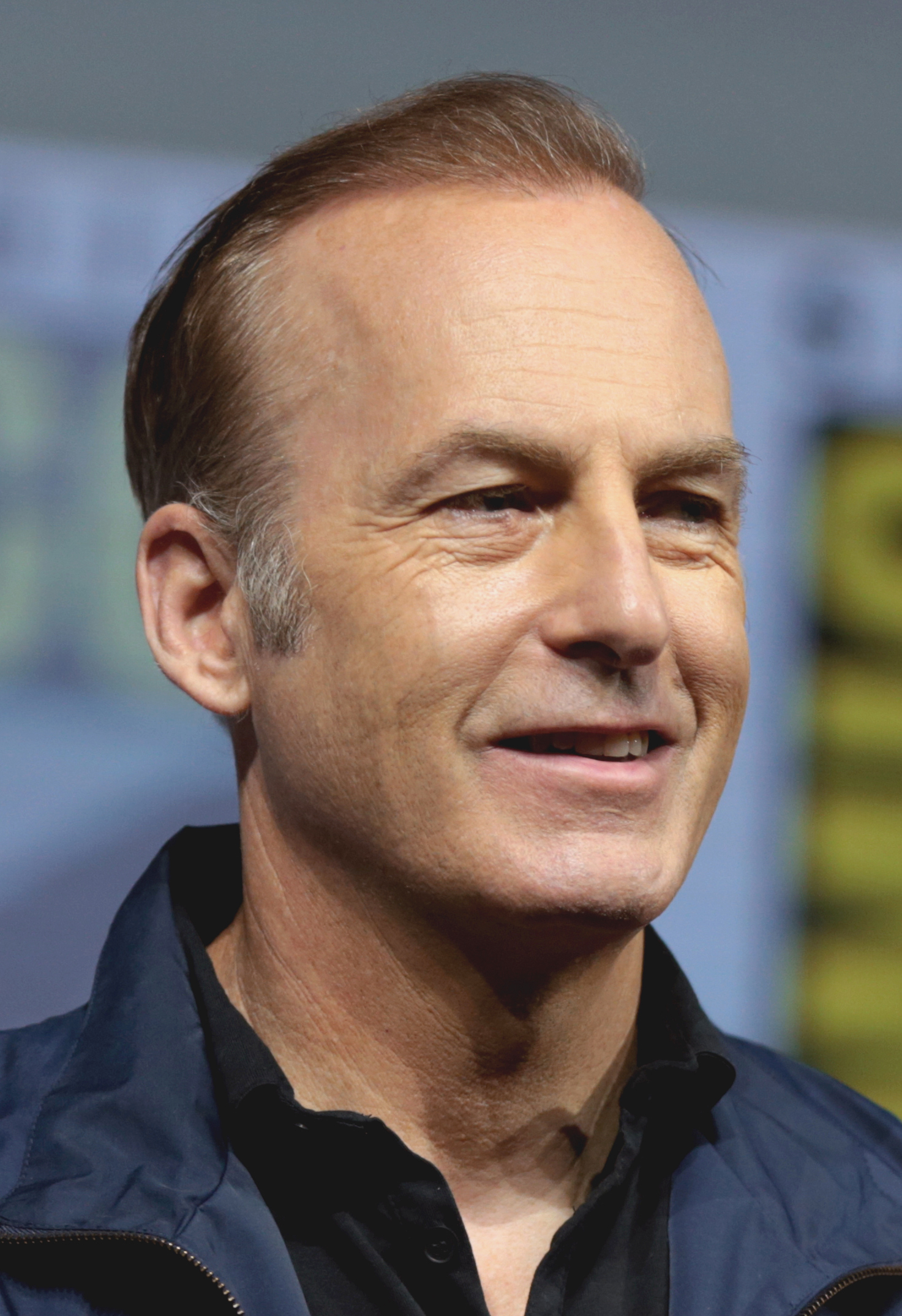
Bob Odenkirk, Best Actor in a Drama Series winner

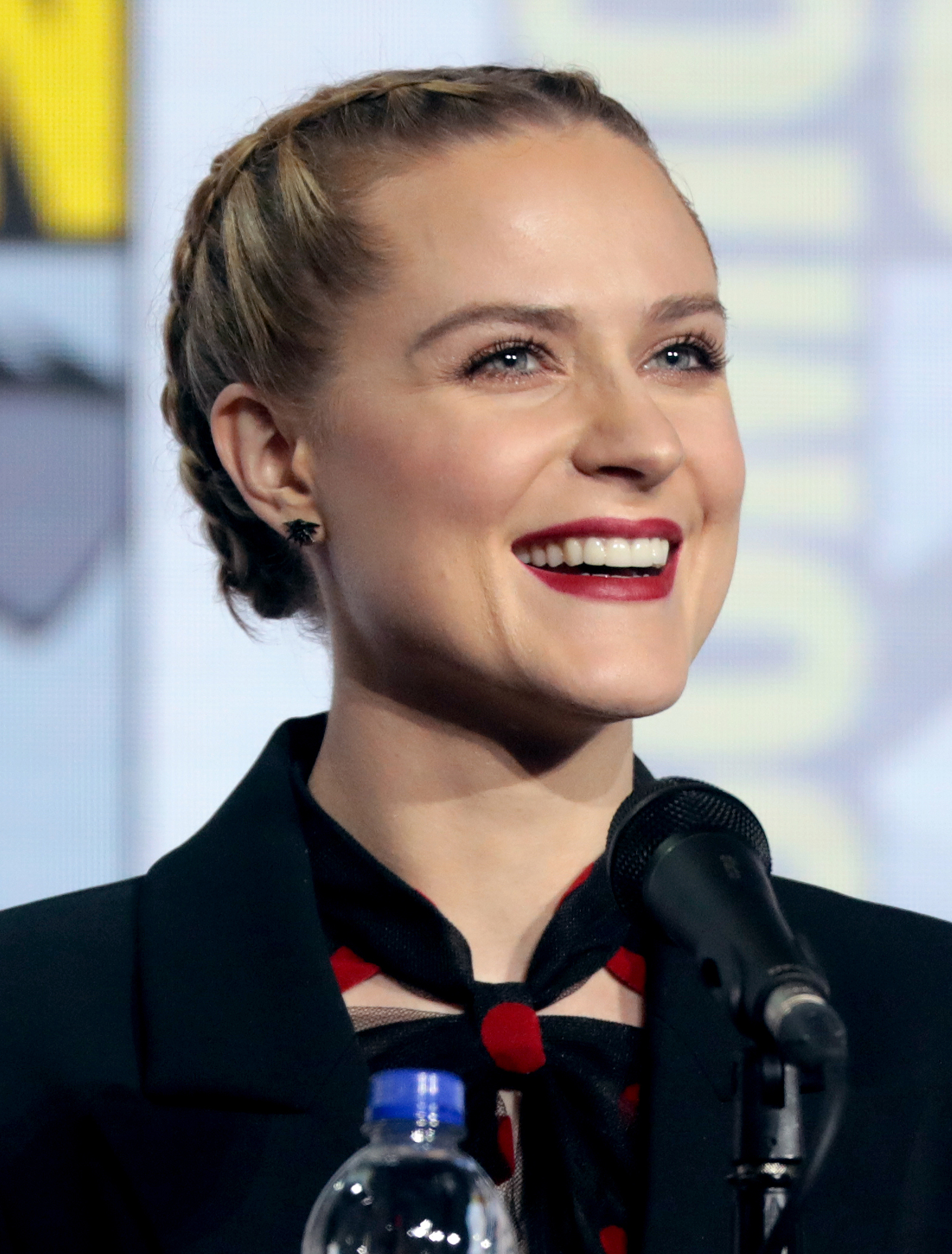
Evan Rachel Wood, Best Actress in a Drama Series winner

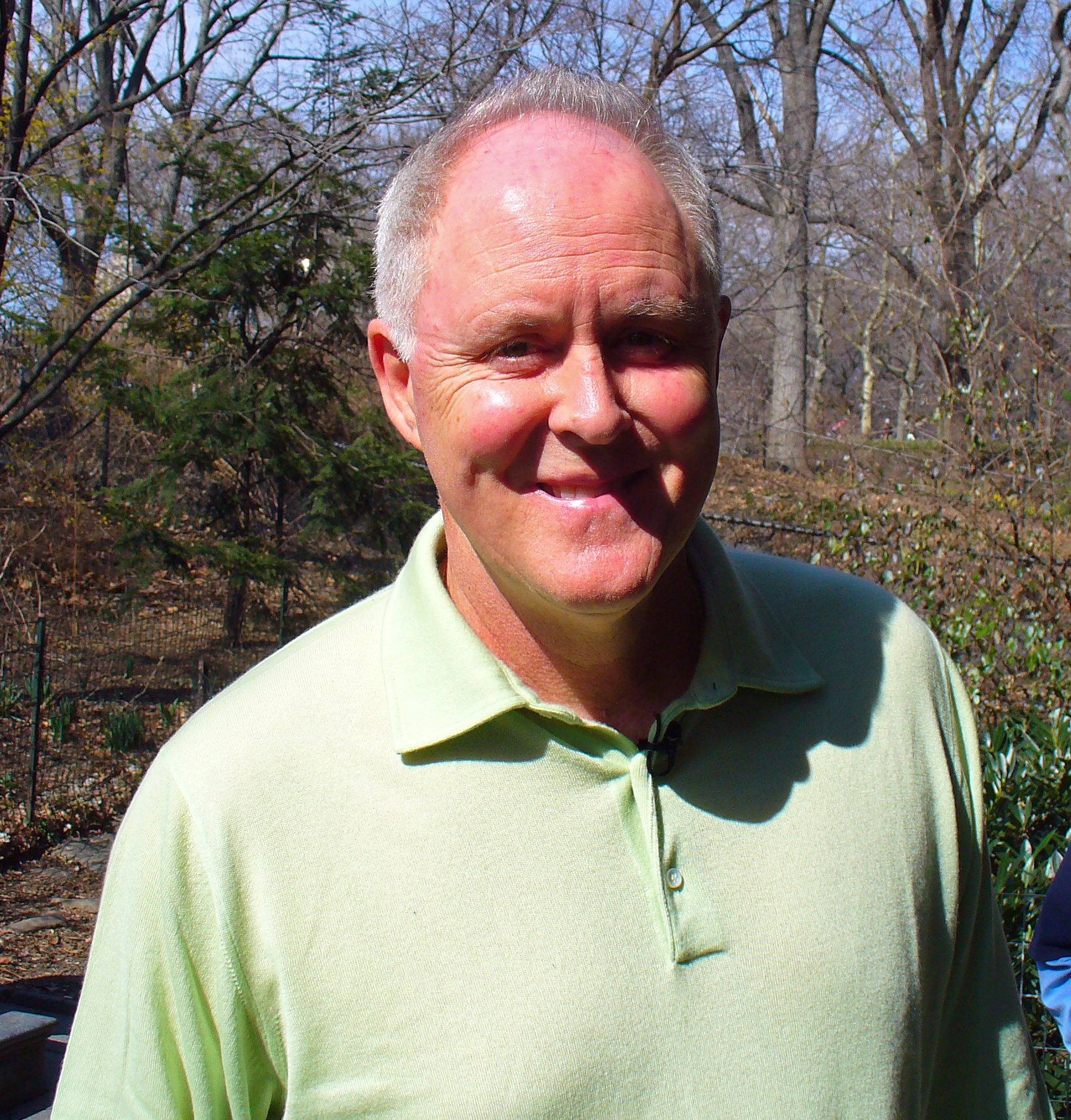
John Lithgow, Best Supporting Actor in a Drama Series winner

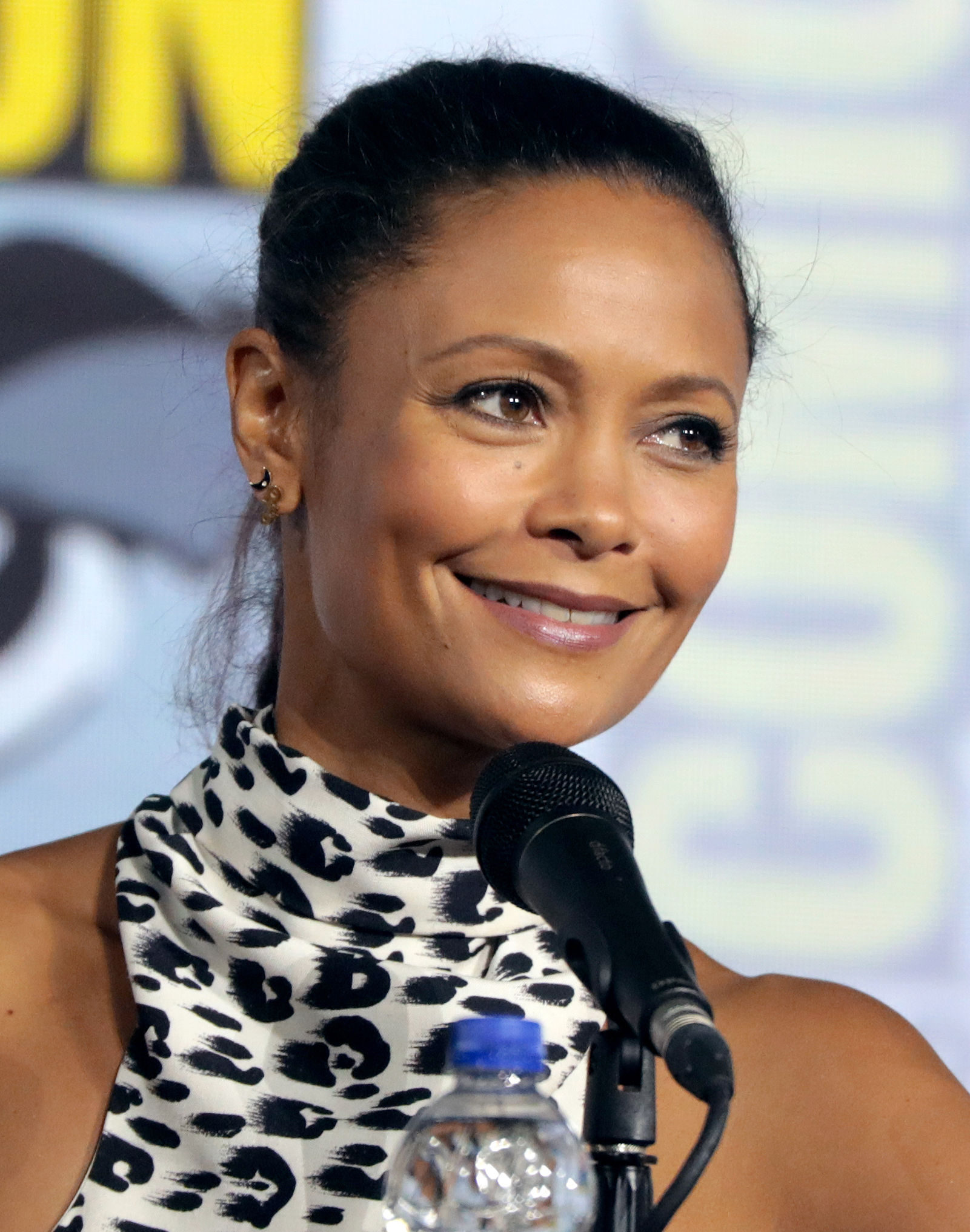
Thandiwe Newton, Best Supporting Actress in a Drama Series winner

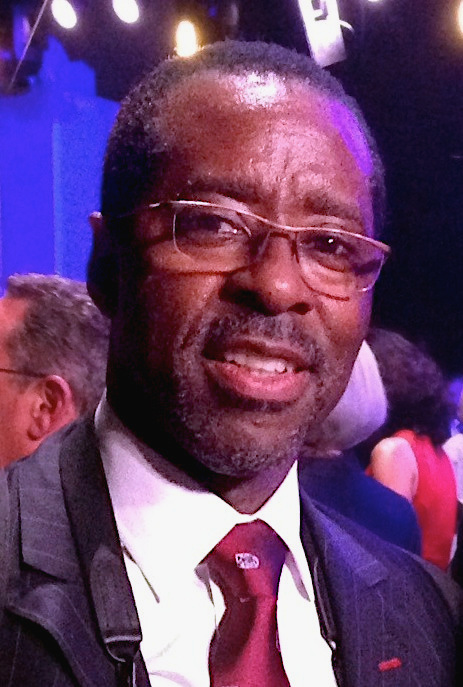
Courtney B. Vance, Best Actor in a Movie Made for Television or Limited Series winner

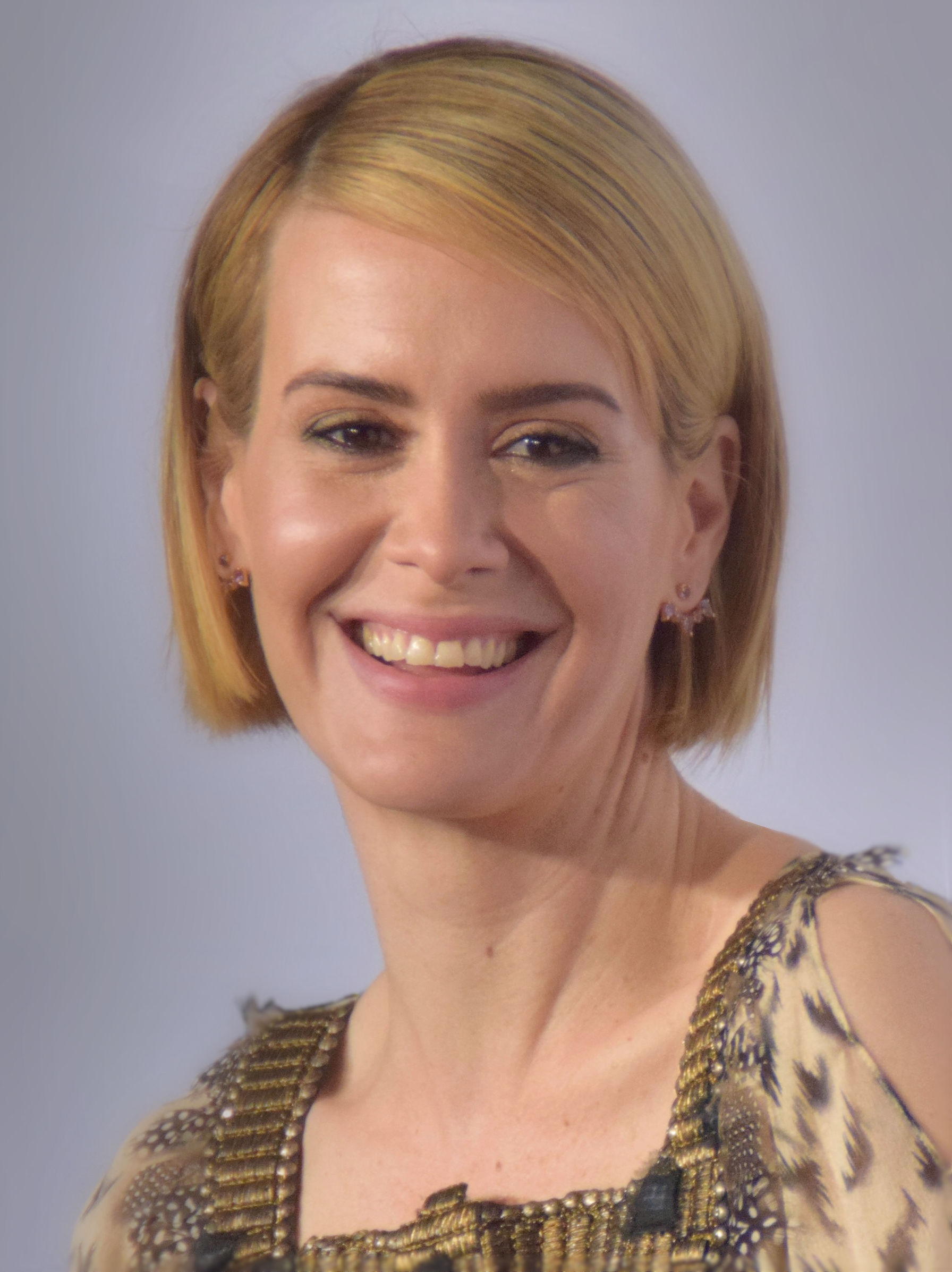
Sarah Paulson, Best Actress in a Movie Made for Television or Limited Series winner

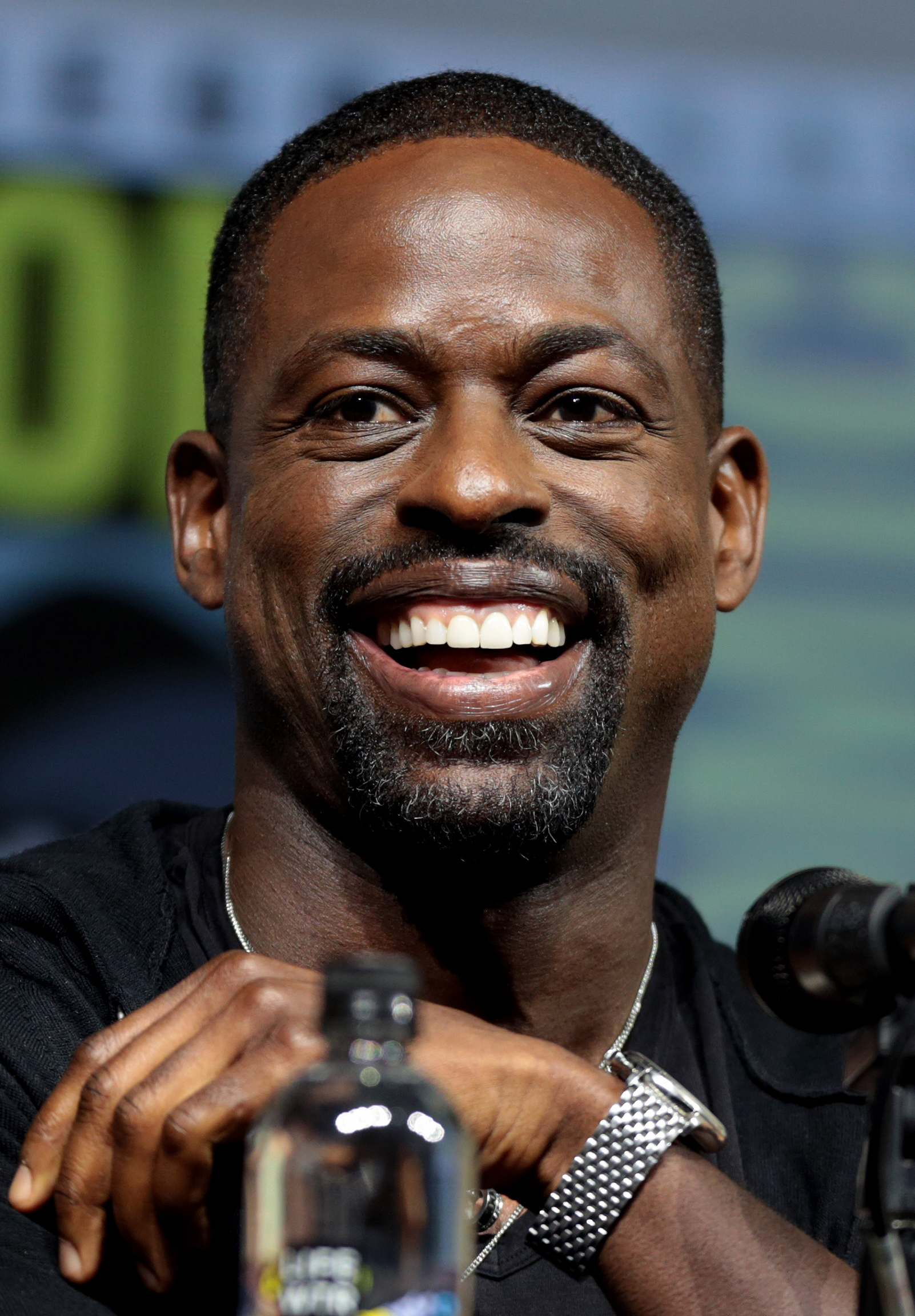
Sterling K. Brown, Best Supporting Actor in a Movie Made for Television or Limited Series winner

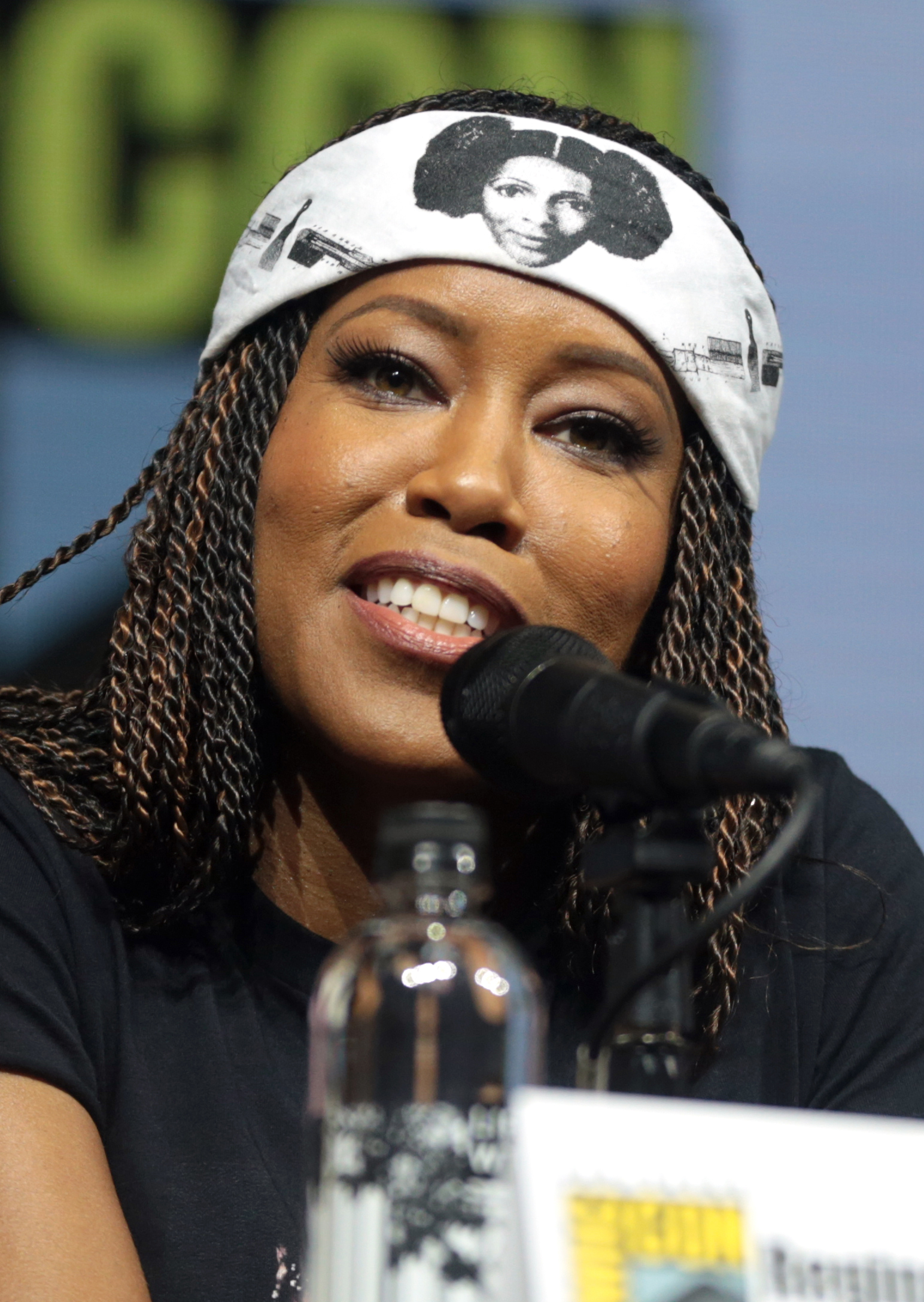
Regina King, Best Supporting Actress in a Movie Made for Television or Limited Series winner

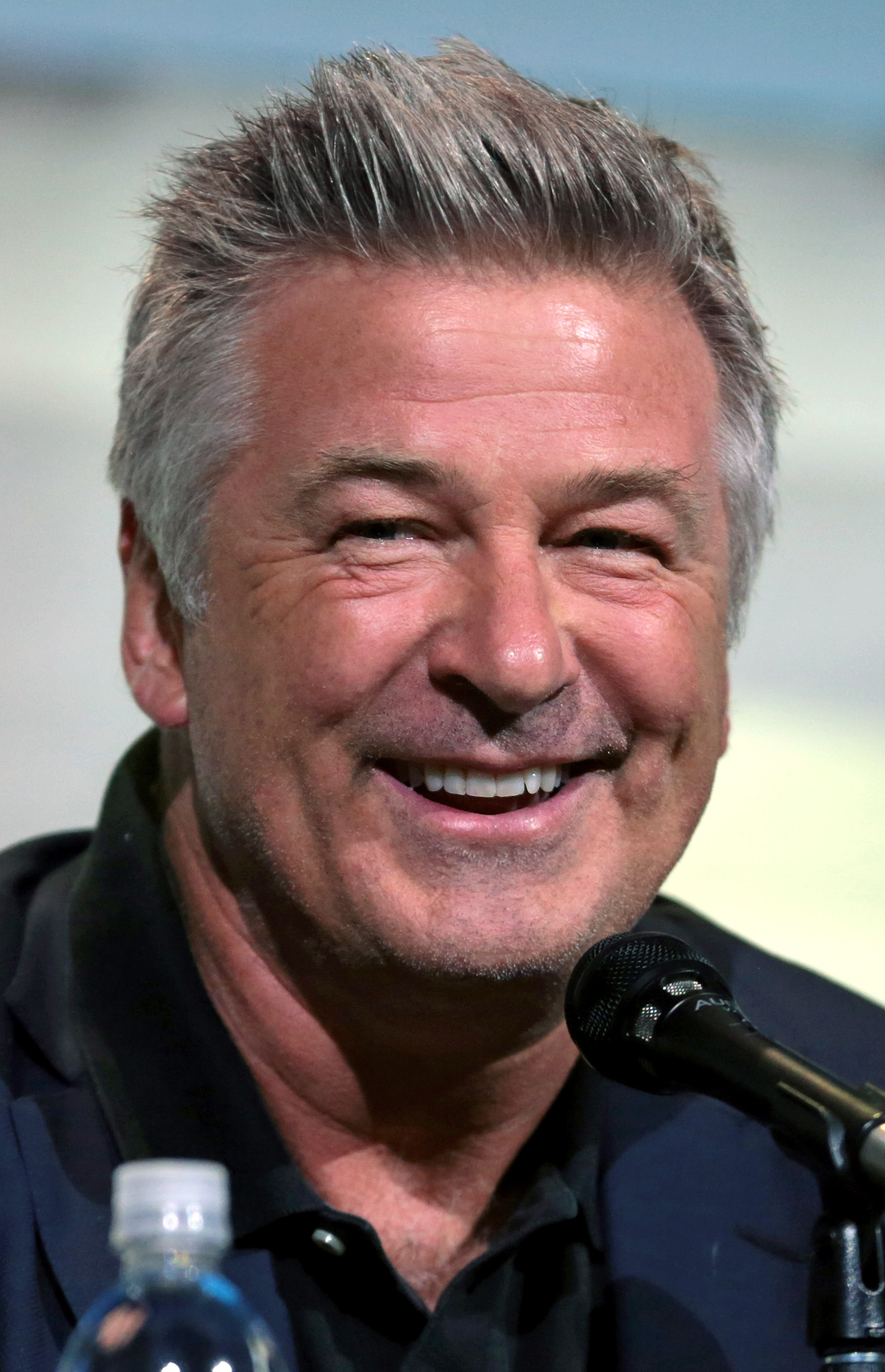
Alec Baldwin, Best Guest Performer in a Comedy Series winner

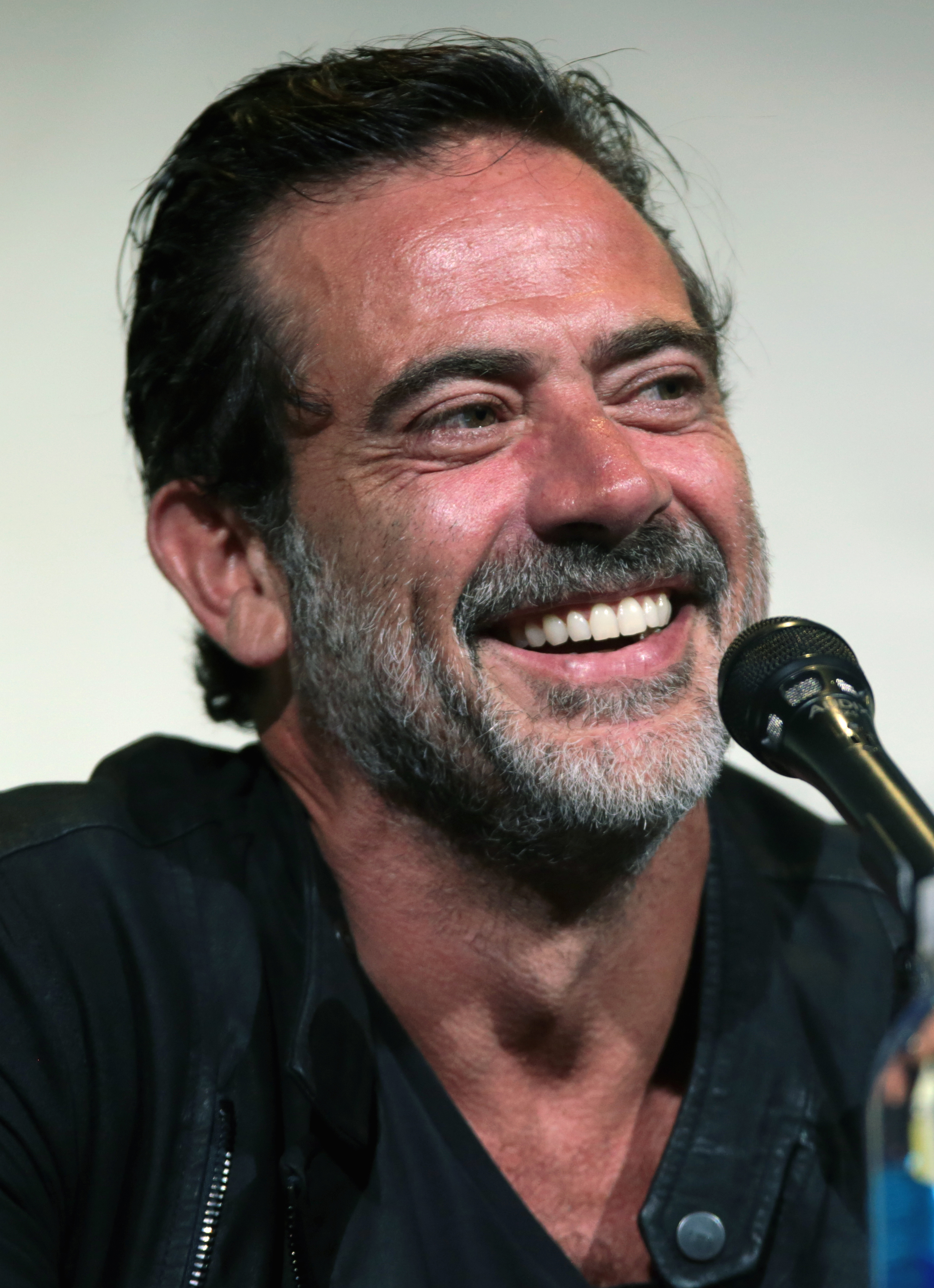
Jeffrey Dean Morgan, Best Guest Performer in a Drama Series winner

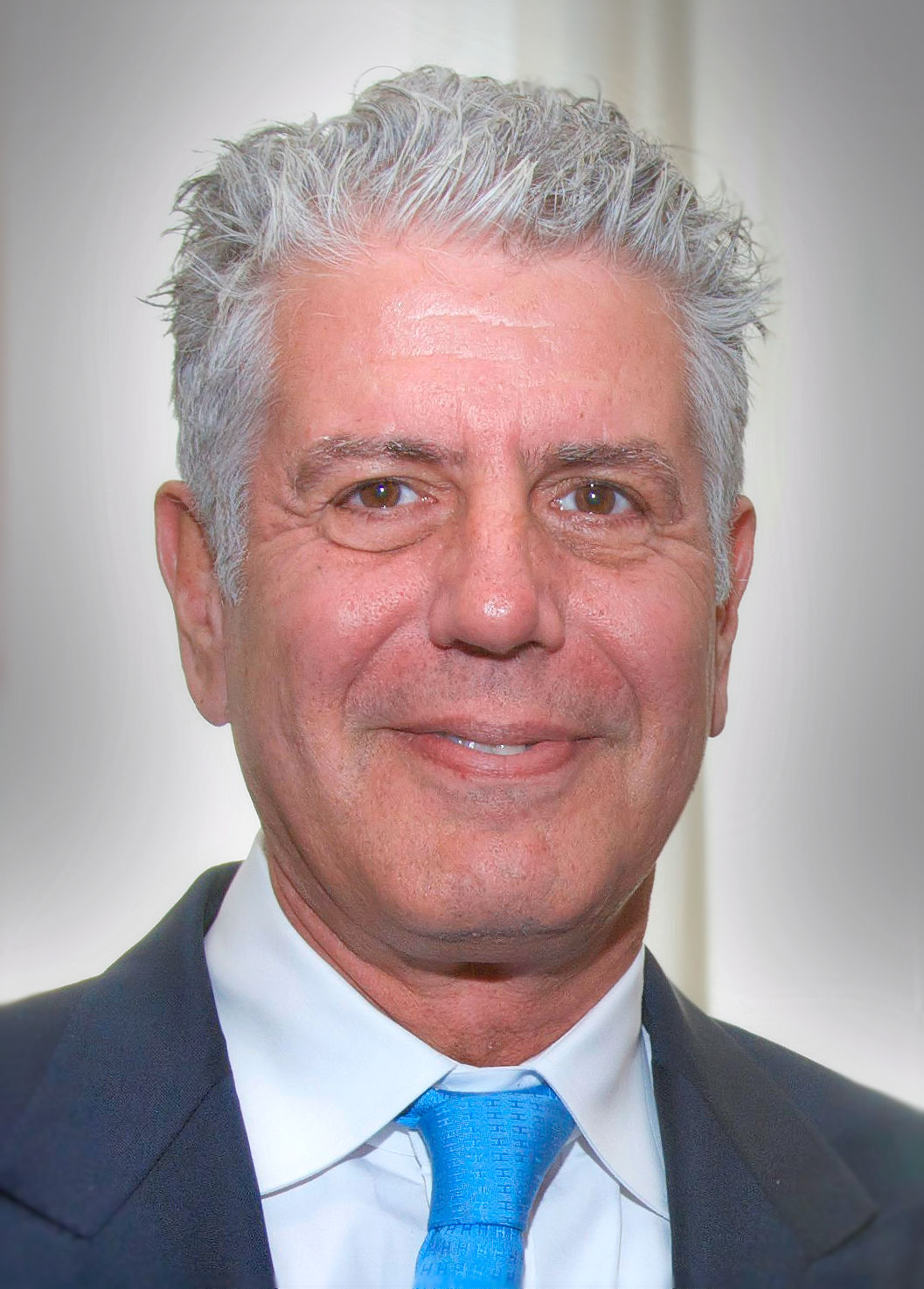
Anthony Bourdain, Best Reality Show Host winner

Best Series
| Best Comedy Series | Best Drama Series |
|---|---|
| Silicon Valley (HBO): Atlanta (FX); Black-ish (ABC); Fleabag (Amazon); Modern Family (ABC); Unbreakable Kimmy Schmidt (Netflix); Veep (HBO) | Game of Thrones (HBO): Better Call Saul (AMC); The Crown (Netflix); Mr. Robot (USA); Stranger Things (Netflix); This Is Us (NBC); Westworld (HBO) |
| Best Movie Made for Television or Limited Series | Best Animated Series |
| The People v. O. J. Simpson: American Crime Story (FX): All the Way (HBO); Confirmation (HBO); Killing Reagan (Nat Geo); The Night Manager (AMC); Roots (History) | Family Guy (Fox): Archer (FX); Bob's Burgers (Fox); The Simpsons (Fox); South Park (Comedy Central); Steven Universe (Cartoon Network) |
Most Bingeworthy Show
Outlander (Starz): Bates Motel (A&E); Catastrophe (Amazon); Game of Thrones (HBO); Mr. Robot (USA); Stranger Things (Netflix)
Best Acting in a Comedy Series
| Best Actor | Best Actress |
| Donald Glover as Earnest "Earn" Marks – Atlanta: Anthony Anderson as Andre "Dre" Johnson Sr. – Black-ish; Will Forte as Phil Miller – The Last Man on Earth; Bill Hader as Various Characters – Documentary Now!; Patrick Stewart as Walter Blunt – Blunt Talk; Jeffrey Tambor as Maura Pfefferman – Transparent | Kate McKinnon as Various Characters – Saturday Night Live: Ellie Kemper as Kimmy Schmidt – Unbreakable Kimmy Schmidt; Julia Louis-Dreyfus as Selina Meyer – Veep; Tracee Ellis Ross as Dr. Rainbow "Bow" Johnson – Black-ish; Phoebe Waller-Bridge as Fleabag – Fleabag; Constance Wu as Jessica Huang – Fresh Off the Boat |
| Best Supporting Actor | Best Supporting Actress |
| Louie Anderson as Christine Baskets – Baskets: Andre Braugher as Captain Raymond Holt – Brooklyn Nine-Nine; Tituss Burgess as Titus Andromedon – Unbreakable Kimmy Schmidt; Ty Burrell as Phil Dunphy – Modern Family; Tony Hale as Gary Walsh – Veep; T.J. Miller as Erlich Bachman – Silicon Valley | Jane Krakowski as Jacqueline White – Unbreakable Kimmy Schmidt: Julie Bowen as Claire Dunphy – Modern Family; Anna Chlumsky as Amy Brookheimer – Veep; Allison Janney as Bonnie Plunkett – Mom; Judith Light as Shelly Pfefferman – Transparent; Allison Williams as Marnie Marie Michaels – Girls |
Best Acting in a Drama Series
| Best Actor | Best Actress |
| Bob Odenkirk as Jimmy McGill – Better Call Saul: Sam Heughan as Jamie Fraser – Outlander; Rami Malek as Elliot Alderson – Mr. Robot; Matthew Rhys as Philip Jennings – The Americans; Liev Schreiber as Ray Donovan – Ray Donovan; Kevin Spacey as President Frank Underwood – House of Cards | Evan Rachel Wood as Dolores Abernathy – Westworld: Caitríona Balfe as Claire Fraser – Outlander; Viola Davis as Professor Annalise Keating, Esq. – How to Get Away with Murder; Tatiana Maslany as Various Characters – Orphan Black; Keri Russell as Elizabeth Jennings – The Americans; Robin Wright as First Lady Claire Underwood – House of Cards |
| Best Supporting Actor | Best Supporting Actress |
| John Lithgow as Winston Churchill – The Crown: Peter Dinklage as Tyrion Lannister – Game of Thrones; Kit Harington as Jon Snow – Game of Thrones; Michael McKean as Chuck McGill – Better Call Saul; Christian Slater as Mr. Robot – Mr. Robot; Jon Voight as Mickey Donovan – Ray Donovan | Thandiwe Newton as Maeve Millay – Westworld: Christine Baranski as Diane Lockhart – The Good Wife; Emilia Clarke as Daenerys Targaryen – Game of Thrones; Lena Headey as Cersei Lannister – Game of Thrones; Maura Tierney as Helen Solloway – The Affair; Constance Zimmer as Quinn King – UnREAL |
Best Acting in a Movie Made for Television or Limited Series
| Best Actor | Best Actress |
| Courtney B. Vance as Johnnie Cochran – The People v. O. J. Simpson: American Crime Story: Bryan Cranston as President Lyndon B. Johnson – All the Way; Benedict Cumberbatch as Sherlock Holmes – Sherlock: The Abominable Bride; Cuba Gooding Jr. as O. J. Simpson – The People v. O. J. Simpson: American Crime Story; Tom Hiddleston as Jonathan Pine – The Night Manager; Tim Matheson as President Ronald Reagan – Killing Reagan | Sarah Paulson as Marcia Clark – The People v. O. J. Simpson: American Crime Story: Olivia Colman as Angela Burr – The Night Manager; Felicity Huffman as Leslie Graham – American Crime; Cynthia Nixon as Nancy Reagan – Killing Reagan; Lili Taylor as Anna Blaine – American Crime; Kerry Washington as Anita Hill – Confirmation |
| Best Supporting Actor | Best Supporting Actress |
| Sterling K. Brown as Christopher Darden – The People v. O. J. Simpson: American Crime Story: Lane Garrison as Frederick Murray – Roots; Frank Langella as Senator Richard Russell Jr. – All the Way; Hugh Laurie as Richard Onslow Roper – The Night Manager; John Travolta as Robert Shapiro – The People v. O. J. Simpson: American Crime Story; Forest Whitaker as Henry (Fiddler) – Roots | Regina King as Terri LaCroix – American Crime: Elizabeth Debicki as Jed Marshall – The Night Manager; Sarah Lancashire as Madge – The Dresser; Melissa Leo as Lady Bird Johnson – All the Way; Anna Paquin as Nancy Holt – Roots; Emily Watson as Her Ladyship – The Dresser |
Best Guest Performing
| Best Guest Performer – Comedy | Best Guest Performer – Drama |
| Alec Baldwin as President Donald Trump – Saturday Night Live: Christine Baranski as Dr. Beverly Hofstadter – The Big Bang Theory; Larry David as Bernie Sanders / Various Characters – Saturday Night Live; Lisa Kudrow as Lori-Ann Schmidt – Unbreakable Kimmy Schmidt; Liam Neeson as himself – Inside Amy Schumer | Jeffrey Dean Morgan as Negan – The Walking Dead: Mahershala Ali as Remy Danton – House of Cards; Lisa Bonet as Marisol – Ray Donovan; Ellen Burstyn as Elizabeth Hale – House of Cards; Michael J. Fox as Louis Canning – The Good Wife; Jared Harris as King George VI – The Crown |
Reality & Variety
| Best Structured Reality Series | Best Unstructured Reality Series |
| Shark Tank (ABC): Chopped (Food Network); Inside the Actors Studio (Bravo); Penn & Teller: Fool Us (The CW); Project Runway (Lifetime); Undercover Boss (CBS) | Anthony Bourdain: Parts Unknown (CNN): Chrisley Knows Best (USA); Deadliest Catch (Discovery); Ice Road Truckers (History); Intervention (A&E); Naked and Afraid (Discovery) |
| Best Reality Competition Series | Best Reality Show Host |
| The Voice (NBC): The Amazing Race (CBS); America's Got Talent (NBC); Lip Sync Battle (Spike); MasterChef Junior (Fox); Skin Wars (GSN) | Anthony Bourdain – Anthony Bourdain: Parts Unknown: Ted Allen – Chopped; Tom Bergeron – Dancing with the Stars; Nick Cannon – America's Got Talent; Carson Daly – The Voice; RuPaul – RuPaul's Drag Race |
Best Talk Show
The Late Late Show with James Corden (CBS): The Daily Show with Trevor Noah (Comedy Central); Full Frontal with Samantha Bee (TBS); Jimmy Kimmel Live! (ABC); Last Week Tonight with John Oliver (HBO); The Tonight Show Starring Jimmy Fallon (NBC)

=== #SeeHer Award ===
Viola Davis

== Films with multiple nominations and wins ==
The following twenty-nine films received multiple nominations:

| Film | Nominations |
|---|---|
| La La Land | 12 |
| Arrival | 10 |
| Moonlight | 10 |
| Manchester by the Sea | 8 |
| Hacksaw Ridge | 7 |
| Doctor Strange | 6 |
| Fences | 6 |
| Hell or High Water | 6 |
| Jackie | 6 |
| Lion | 6 |
| Deadpool | 4 |
| Fantastic Beasts and Where to Find Them | 4 |
| Loving | 4 |
| Sully | 4 |
| Captain America: Civil War | 3 |
| The Edge of Seventeen | 3 |
| Florence Foster Jenkins | 3 |
| Hidden Figures | 3 |
| Nocturnal Animals | 3 |
| 20th Century Women | 3 |
| Central Intelligence | 2 |
| Elle | 2 |
| Jason Bourne | 2 |
| Love & Friendship | 2 |
| Moana | 2 |
| A Monster Calls | 2 |
| The Nice Guys | 2 |
| Star Trek Beyond | 2 |
| Trolls | 2 |

The following seven films received multiple awards:

| Film | Awards |
|---|---|
| La La Land | 8 |
| Jackie | 3 |
| Manchester by the Sea | 3 |
| Arrival | 2 |
| Deadpool | 2 |
| Hacksaw Ridge | 2 |
| Moonlight | 2 |

== Television programs with multiple nominations and wins ==
The following programs received multiple nominations:

| Program | Network | Category | Nominations |
|---|---|---|---|
| Game of Thrones | HBO | Drama | 6 |
| The People v. O. J. Simpson: American Crime Story | FX | Limited | 6 |
| The Night Manager | AMC | Limited | 5 |
| Unbreakable Kimmy Schmidt | Netflix | Comedy | 5 |
| All the Way | HBO | Movie | 4 |
| House of Cards | Netflix | Drama | 4 |
| Mr. Robot | USA | Drama | 4 |
| Roots | History | Limited | 4 |
| Veep | HBO | Comedy | 4 |
| Better Call Saul | AMC | Drama | 3 |
| The Crown | Netflix | Drama | 3 |
| Killing Reagan | Nat Geo | Movie | 3 |
| Modern Family | ABC | Comedy | 3 |
| Outlander | Starz | Drama | 3 |
| Ray Donovan | Showtime | Drama | 3 |
| Saturday Night Live | NBC | Comedy | 3 |
| Westworld | HBO | Drama | 3 |
| American Crime | ABC | Limited | 2 |
| The Americans | FX | Drama | 2 |
| America's Got Talent | NBC | Reality – Competition | 2 |
| Anthony Bourdain: Parts Unknown | CNN | Reality – Unstructured | 2 |
| Atlanta | FX | Comedy | 2 |
| Chopped | Food Network | Reality – Structured (Note: Previously categorized as Reality – Competition) | 2 |
| Confirmation | HBO | Movie | 2 |
| The Dresser | Starz | Movie | 2 |
| Fleabag | Amazon | Comedy | 2 |
| The Good Wife | CBS | Drama | 2 |
| RuPaul's Drag Race | Logo TV | Reality – Competition | 2 |
| Silicon Valley | HBO | Comedy | 2 |
| Stranger Things | Netflix | Drama | 2 |
| Transparent | Amazon | Comedy | 2 |
| The Voice | NBC | Reality – Competition | 2 |

The following programs received multiple awards:

| Program | Network | Category | Awards |
|---|---|---|---|
| The People v. O. J. Simpson: American Crime Story | FX | Limited | 4 |
| Anthony Bourdain: Parts Unknown | CNN | Reality | 2 |
| Saturday Night Live | NBC | Comedy | 2 |
| Westworld | HBO | Drama | 2 |
