= The Auguries (Westworld) =

- Westworld episode
- Episode no.: Season 4 Episode 1
- Directed by: Richard J. Lewis
- Written by: Lisa Joy; Will Soodik
- Cinematography by: John Conroy
- Editing by: Andrew Seklir; Sarah C. Reeves; Thomas Sabinsky
- Production code: 401
- Original air date: June 26, 2022
- Running time: 52 minutes

Guest appearances
- Ariana DeBose as Maya; Rodrigo Santoro as Hector Escaton (archive footage); Frederic Lehne as Colonel Brigham; Arturo Del Puerto as Hugo Mora; Alex Fernandez as Mr. Mora; Nozipho McLean as Uwade; Celeste Clark as Frankie Nichols; Manny Montana as Carver; Michael Malarkey as Emmett; Aaron Stanford as Peter Myers; Brandon Sklenar as Henry

Episode chronology
← Previous "Crisis Theory"	Next → "Well Enough Alone"

"The Auguries" is the first episode of the fourth season of Westworld. The episode aired on June 26, 2022, on HBO. It was written by series creator Lisa Joy and Will Soodik and directed by Richard J. Lewis.

== Plot summary ==
Seven years after the events of the third season, William, acting as CEO of Delos, approaches the owner of the Hoover Dam, which now houses a large server farm that contains data he wants from eight years ago, with an offer to purchase the property. The owner refuses, to which William replies that since he doesn't want his money, he'll just have to give it to him for free. The owner discovers a large fly colony in his bedroom, then brutally kills his business associates with a knife. Outside, he agrees to turn over the property before William grants him permission to commit suicide.

In New York City, Christina, a brunette woman who resembles Dolores Abernathy, works as a writer at Olympiad Entertainment, creating stories for the non-player characters in video games. The company's higher-ups are skeptical of Christina's push to give her characters more pleasant and happier backstories, insisting that the public craves tales of darkness and self-destruction. Christina is stalked by a man named Peter Myers, who claims she is controlling his life and begs her to stop.

Maeve, now living anonymously in a rural cabin, is working to hone her abilities. One day, she learns from a local general store owner that several "friends" are looking for her. Returning to her cabin, she sees armed hosts lying in wait to ambush her and sets a trap for them. The hosts are all killed, and Maeve harvests the core of their leader to learn that Delos is responsible for the attack. She then burns down her cabin and sets out on foot.

Christina's roommate Maya takes her to a restaurant for a blind date, which ends poorly when the man inadvertently upsets Christina by commenting on her work. While walking home, Christina runs into Peter, who tries to physically assault her. Suddenly, a stranger pulls him off her and beats him while Christina watches before passing out. The next morning, Peter calls and tells her that he's ending his story, before jumping to his death in front of her apartment.

Caleb is now married and living with his wife and young daughter, Frankie. Frankie adores her father, but also shows an interest in guns and violence, which horrifies Caleb's wife. She confronts him for not dealing with his PTSD and engaging with his war buddies in various conspiracy theories, which she sees as dangerous to both her husband and the social development of their daughter. While taking out the garbage, Caleb and Frankie are attacked by another host before Maeve stabs him from behind. Realizing that the war has begun again, Caleb has his friends keep watch over his family while he and Maeve depart to track down one of William's contacts.

Christina is working on a new character's story when she notices a shattered potted plant on her balcony, indicating that someone was spying on her. On the balcony’s floor, there is a depiction of the infamous maze, but she seems to not react to it. In the streets below, a man resembling Teddy (James Marsden) looks up at her from the shadows.

== Music ==
A cover by Ramin Djawadi of the Lana Del Rey song "Video Games" plays into the credits at the end of the episode.
