= Westworld season 4 =

Season of television series

Westworld
- Season 4
- Poster art
- Starring: Evan Rachel Wood; Thandiwe Newton; Jeffrey Wright; Tessa Thompson; Aaron Paul; Angela Sarafyan; Ed Harris; James Marsden; Luke Hemsworth
- No. of episodes: 8

Release
- Original network: HBO
- Original release: June 26 – August 14, 2022

Season chronology
- ← Previous; Season 3

The fourth and final season of the American science fiction dystopian television series Westworld, subtitled The Choice, premiered on HBO on June 26, 2022, and concluded on August 14, 2022, consisting of eight episodes. In November 2022, HBO announced it had canceled the series.

The television series was created by Jonathan Nolan and Lisa Joy, and it is based on the 1973 film of the same name, written and directed by Michael Crichton. The fourth season stars an ensemble cast led by Evan Rachel Wood, Thandiwe Newton, Jeffrey Wright, Tessa Thompson, Aaron Paul, James Marsden, and Ed Harris.

== Plot summary ==
The first half of the fourth season picks up in 2060, seven years after the end of season 3, while the second half takes place 23 years later, in 2083. The season is described as a "dark odyssey about the fate of sentient life on Earth." The season includes an amusement park modeled after the Roaring Twenties.

Humanity has lost the war, with Charlotte Hale's host copy having filled the power vacuum left behind by Engerraund Serac and his Rehoboam, ascending as the sole power over Delos after deposing William and replacing him with an identical host loyal to her. Charlotte succeeds in taking control of the world by removing world leaders and installing hosts in their place, simultaneously deploying a bioengineered virus that infects humans over the course of a generation, making them susceptible to her and other hosts' orders. This has reversed the power dynamic between humans and hosts – which had previously existed only within the Delos parks, acted on by only a limited number of humans against hosts that regenerated nightly – to now be the worldwide domination of all humanity by a limited number of hosts. She has replaced Serac's system, which had managed humanity to ensure world peace and maximum possible well-being, with her own system of controlling humanity to ensure maximum prosperity for hosts. When bored, she tortures random humans.

Two decades later, Christina, a woman resembling Dolores who works at a video game company writing non-player character (NPC) storylines and backstories, gradually begins to question the nature of her reality after she realizes that it appears her stories are somehow translating to the lives of people in the real world. In actuality, she is a program created by Charlotte to manage a largely docile humanity, with the hosts now controlling and managing their lives through carefully detailed and manufactured "storylines", which are transmitted directly to the minds and lives of humans through a series of radio-sonic transmission "tones" in organized metropolitan areas across the world. Humans now act out the storylines set by hosts.

Meanwhile, Bernard Lowe continues the mission left to him by Dolores, spending two decades simulating near-endless realities in the Sublime, where he hopes to find a path to saving both hosts and humanity. Having found the supposedly best course, he and Stubbs set out to enact that path. They discover a group of "outliers" – humans who have evolved immunity to the hosts' virus – and eventually reunite with Maeve, who had been left for dead in a confrontation with Charlotte decades earlier.

Together, they mobilize against Charlotte's regime, though Bernard eventually reveals to Maeve that their efforts will be futile, and the present world will inevitably go extinct, with hope only for “the next one”. The season climaxes with Christina accepting the reality of her existence and starting to release humans from their controlled storylines, as new host William descends into nihilistic insanity and corrupts the tone program, throwing the world into a chaotic extinction-level war between newly liberated humans and hosts around the globe. Realizing those who truly sought it already transcended their body-based existence in the Sublime, Charlotte loses faith in both humanity and the hosts that remain in the waking world and destroys William’s control unit once and for all.

Upon coming to terms with the fact that she cannot let go of her own human blueprint, Charlotte uploads Christina's code into the Sublime on Bernard’s posthumous advice, before proceeding to destroy her own control unit. At the conclusion of the season, Christina finally reacquires her sentience and realizes she is a reprogrammed and last true version of Dolores Abernathy. With humanity on the brink of an unprecedented extinction, Dolores decides to simulate "one last game" in the Sublime to determine if any part of human – or host – sentience may yet be preserved in “a new world”.

== Cast and characters ==
=== Main ===
- Evan Rachel Wood as Christina / Dolores Abernathy
- Thandiwe Newton as Maeve Millay
- Jeffrey Wright as Bernard Lowe
- Tessa Thompson as Dolores Abernathy a.k.a. Charlotte Hale
- Aaron Paul as Caleb Nichols
- Angela Sarafyan as Clementine Pennyfeather (Note: Credited with the main cast in the episodes in which they appear.)
- Ed Harris as William / Host William
- James Marsden as Teddy Flood (Note: Uncredited for his appearance in "The Auguries".)
- Luke Hemsworth as Ashley Stubbs

=== Recurring ===
- Ariana DeBose as Maya
- Nozipho McLean as Uwade Nichols
- Celeste Clark as young Frankie Nichols
- Manny Montana as Carver
- Michael Malarkey as Emmett
- Aaron Stanford as Peter Myers
- Aurora Perrineau as Frankie "C" Nichols
- Daniel Wu as Jay
- Morningstar Angeline as Odina

=== Guest ===
- Rodrigo Santoro as Hector Escaton (Note: Archive footage.)
- Fredric Lehne as Colonel Brigham
- Arturo Del Puerto as Hugo Mora
- Alex Fernandez as Mr. Mora
- Brandon Sklenar as Henry
- Jasmyn Rae as Maeve's Daughter
- Jack Coleman as Senator Ken Whitney
- Saffron Burrows as Anastasia Whitney
- José Zúñiga as the Vice President of the United States
- Josh Randall as Jim Navarro
- Liza Weil as Deborah
- Lili Simmons as Sophia
- Zahn McClarnon as Akecheta
- Cherise Boothe as Temperance Maeve
- Nico Galán as Temperance Hector
- Hannah James as Temperance Clementine
- Paul-Mikél Williams as Charlie
- Emily Somers as Lindsay
- Nicole Pacent as Hope
- Evan Williams as Jack
- Alec Wang as young Jay
- Jonathan Tucker as Major Craddock
- Steven Ogg as Rebus

== Episodes ==
| No. overall | No. in season | Title | Directed by | Written by | Original release date | Prod. code | U.S. viewers (millions) |
|---|---|---|---|---|---|---|---|
| 29 | 1 | "The Auguries" | Richard J. Lewis | Lisa Joy & Will Soodik | June 26, 2022 | 401 | 0.325 |
Seven years after the shutdown of Rehoboam, a host copy of William manipulates the owner of the Hoover Dam, which now houses a large server farm that contains data he wants from eight years ago, to give it to him for free before killing himself. In New York City, Christina, a woman who resembles Dolores, works as a writer at Olympiad Entertainment, creating stories for the non-player characters in video games. She is repeatedly called by a man named Peter, who claims she is controlling his life and proves it by jumping to his death in front of her. Christina is later seen being secretly watched by someone resembling Teddy. Maeve, living in a remote area, is tracked down by hosts that she kills and discovers were sent by the Host William. She drives to California to stop another host from killing Caleb and his new family. Caleb goes with Maeve to protect the next target.
| 30 | 2 | "Well Enough Alone" | Craig William Macneill | Matthew Pitts & Christina Ham | July 3, 2022 | 402 | 0.350 |
The rogue copy of Dolores in Charlotte's body is revealed to be replacing major U.S. government officials with host copies, with the host William acting as her enforcer. She keeps the human William alive in cryogenic stasis. Maeve and Caleb encounter host copies of California Senator Ken Whitney and his wife Anastasia, and use the former's memory logs to learn of Charlotte's involvement. They find the real Anastasia in a horse farm behaving erratically, and Maeve is forced to kill her when she attacks them. Following cryptic directions Anastasia gave them before she died, Maeve and Caleb find themselves on a train headed into Delos' new park, themed after the Roaring Twenties. Christina finds one of her old narrative files matching what happened to Peter. She visits a mental health hospital in New Jersey to which Peter allegedly donated, only to find it abandoned and riddled with drawings of a distinctive tower.
| 31 | 3 | "Années Folles" | Hanelle M. Culpepper | Kevin Lau & Suzanne Wrubel | July 10, 2022 | 403 | 0.312 |
Bernard meets Akecheta in the Sublime, who informs him that all but one possible version of the future will lead to the world's destruction. Bernard awakens years later in the real world and joins Stubbs in enacting the supposedly correct steps to ensuring humanity's survival, starting by helping a human rebel group find a weapon buried in the desert. Caleb's wife Uwade saves their daughter Frankie from a hostile host copy of their bodyguard. Maeve and Caleb find that the Temperance park closely resembles the events of Westworld, including a narrative based on the hosts' rebellion. They find Charlotte's underground lab housing a swarm of flies, as well as human captives who are forced to kill themselves by a device emitting a distinct sound pattern. Maeve is attacked by the William host. Caleb discovers Frankie is one of the test subjects, but she is revealed to be a host copy of Frankie, and unleashes the flies on Caleb.
| 32 | 4 | "Generation Loss" | Paul Cameron | Kevin Lau & Suzanne Wrubel | July 17, 2022 | 404 | 0.312 |
Christina's roommate Maya sets her up on a date with Teddy. Charlotte explains to Caleb that she is using the Temperance park to infect humans with a parasite that allows them to be controlled by sound. Maeve and Caleb abduct Charlotte. As they flee the park, Maeve recounts to Caleb that after he was wounded during their mission to eliminate the final copy of Rehoboam, Maeve left him in the care of Uwade – a nurse at the time – and only attempted to remotely reach out to him years later, which enabled Charlotte to find them. They take shelter at a nearby park expansion area, where Caleb calls for help. Host William arrives and mortally wounds Maeve, but she triggers explosives that kill them both and knocks out Caleb. When Caleb awakens, Charlotte reveals that he is the 278th Caleb host, and has been reliving the moments leading to his death 23 years prior. Caleb discovers that he is actually in New York City, whose entire population has since fallen under Charlotte's control. Bernard and the adult Frankie (known as C within the rebel group) excavate Maeve's body at the site of the explosion in the desert.
| 33 | 5 | "Zhuangzi" | Craig William Macneill | Wes Humphrey & Lisa Joy | July 24, 2022 | 405 | 0.384 |
Charlotte notices that several hosts she has assigned to eliminate "outliers" – humans that have broken from her conditioning – are killing themselves shortly after contact with the humans. She orders the host William to kill the latest outlier, Lindsay, but she unwittingly causes him to develop empathy and hesitate to kill her, before she is rescued by the human resistance (which is composed of escaped outliers). The human William persuades his host counterpart to begin questioning his reality. Teddy tells Christina she is orchestrating the lives of all of New York's residents, and she discovers that she can directly reprogram humans' behavior. She uses this ability to create a distraction that allows her to evade questioning from Charlotte, whom she believes to be a college friend. Returning to work, she finds she similarly has control over her boss, and enters a master control room that reveals she has written the narratives of every human in the city. She asks Teddy who put her in this situation; Teddy tells her it was herself.
| 34 | 6 | "Fidelity" | Andrew Seklir | Jordan Goldberg & Alli Rock | July 31, 2022 | 406 | 0.394 |
Charlotte interrogates the latest host copy of Caleb to understand why he was the first human outlier. She tells him that Frankie is still alive and that he has hours before his host body degrades. Caleb finds a way out of his holding cell, and discovers the corpses of previous host copies of himself who died while trying to escape. He reaches an antenna and sends an apology to Frankie before collapsing; Charlotte reveals she engineered his escape, but is disappointed his message to Frankie revealed nothing about how the outliers supposedly infect hosts. Caleb asserts that the suicidal hosts are merely trying to escape Charlotte's control. Charlotte destroys Caleb 278 and restarts with Caleb 279. Bernard and Frankie repair Maeve's body while transferring her data to an undamaged host control module. Bernard warns Frankie that one of her team members has been replaced with a host copy during the Lindsay rescue. Frankie discovers it was her team leader, Jay, who attacks her. As Frankie hears Caleb's apology over the radio, Maeve steps in and kills host Jay.
| 35 | 7 | "Metanoia" | Meera Menon | Desa Larkin-Boutte & Denise Thé | August 7, 2022 | 407 | 0.321 |
Bernard and Maeve travel to Hoover Dam to open the door to the Sublime, which Charlotte has kept preserved in the dam's data vault. Christina goes with Teddy to Olympiad Entertainment and has its employees destroy the premises and erase all the stories controlling the humans. Stubbs and Frankie use the distraction to rescue Caleb. Charlotte prepares to discontinue the hosts' inhabitation of human cities so that they can "transcend" their human bodies. William convinces his host self that humans are a fundamentally destructive species; the William host realizes his true purpose and kills the human William. Bernard and Maeve enter the tower; Maeve fights Charlotte while Bernard accesses the control room. William kills Charlotte, Maeve, and Bernard, then programs the tower to turn the humans against each other before it self-destructs. Christina is unable to stop the chaos and realizes the humans cannot see her; Teddy explains that while the world is real, she is not physically there.
| 36 | 8 | "Que Será, Será" | Richard J. Lewis | Alison Schapker & Jonathan Nolan | August 14, 2022 | 408 | 0.391 |
In the wake of the host William's actions, humans and hosts are being wiped out. Caleb, Frankie and Stubbs evade the violence amongst the humans and stop at a pharmacy to tend to Frankie's wounds, but Clementine appears and kills Stubbs before being overpowered and killed by Caleb and Frankie. The two reach their extraction boat; Caleb, whose host body is about to fail, bids farewell to his daughter. Charlotte is revived by drone hosts and finds recorded instructions left for her by Bernard prior to his death. She retrieves Dolores' original control unit, which contains a simulation of the world inhabited by Christina (who created Teddy, Maya, and others to help herself gain sentience). Charlotte then follows William to Hoover Dam and stops him from deactivating the Sublime (using a gun planted by Bernard), before removing and destroying his control unit. She then uploads Dolores' control unit into the Sublime before destroying her own. Dolores awakens inside the Sublime and decides to attempt to give sentient life another chance at avoiding extinction, realizing that neither humans nor hosts can survive in the real world. She starts by recreating the original Westworld park inside the Sublime.

== Production ==
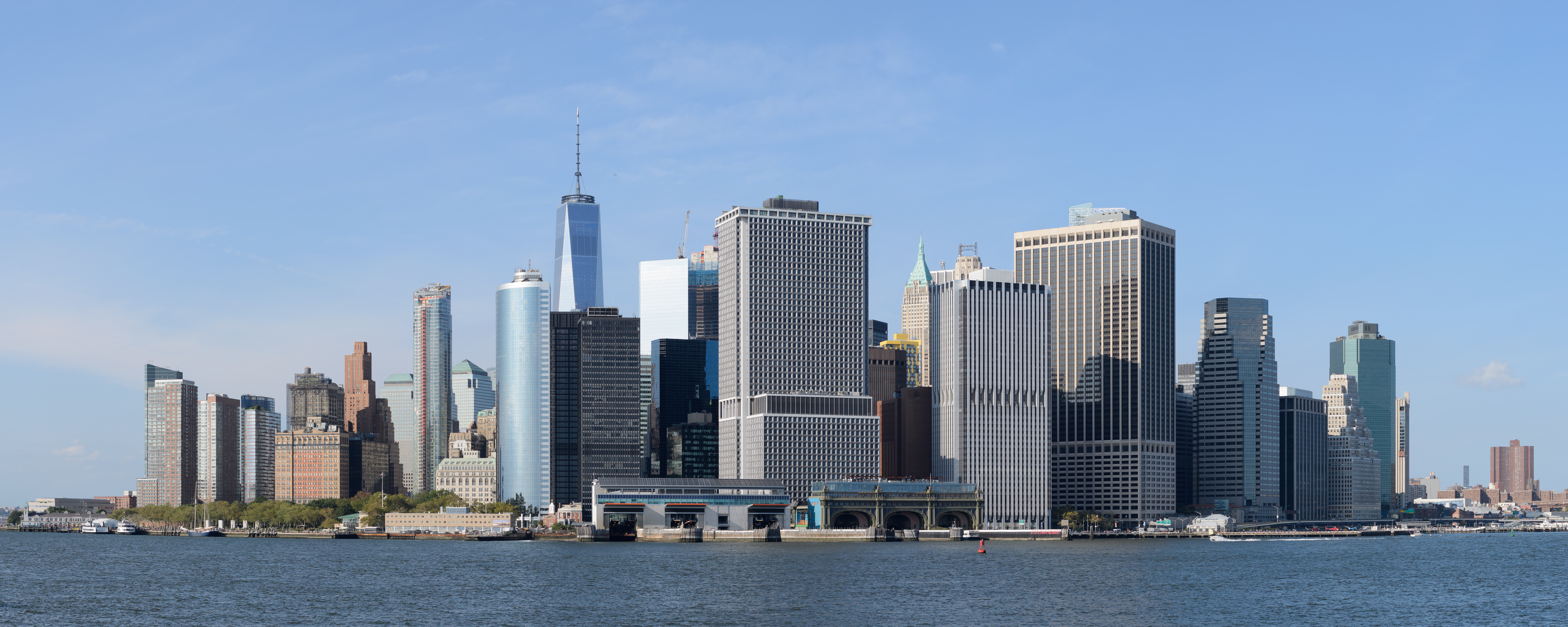
The fourth season is largely set in New York City.

Shortly before the finale of the show's third season in April 2020, HBO renewed Westworld for a fourth season. Aurora Perrineau joined the cast in a recurring role, and production was underway by June 2021 at the Melody Ranch Studio in Newhall, California. Filming was briefly halted in July due to a positive COVID-19 test but resumed after two days, ultimately wrapping in December 2021.

=== Music ===
Westworld: Season 4

Soundtrack album by Ramin Djawadi
- Released: August 14, 2022
- Genre: Soundtrack
- Length: 88:35
- Label: WaterTower Music
- Producer: Ramin Djawadi

Ramin Djawadi soundtracks chronology
| The Man from Toronto (2022) | Westworld: Season 4 (2022) | House of the Dragon: Season 1 (2022) |

| No. | Title | Key scenes/Notes | Length |
|---|---|---|---|
| 1. | "Main Title Theme - Westworld" | Used for the opening credits sequence. | 1:41 |
| 2. | "Parasite" | "Années Folles" | 4:03 |
| 3. | "The Day the World Went Away" | "Zhuangzi": It was used in the official trailer for this season. | 3:40 |
| 4. | "Bad Acid" | "The Auguries" | 3:37 |
| 5. | "Olympiad" | "The Auguries" | 3:36 |
| 6. | "Video Games" | "The Auguries" | 3:52 |
| 7. | "Time to Transcend" | "Well Enough Alone" | 2:18 |
| 8. | "Welcome to the Golden Age" | "Well Enough Alone" | 2:04 |
| 9. | "Années Folles" | "Well Enough Alone" | 1:07 |
| 10. | "Bad Guy" | "Années Folles" | 2:19 |
| 11. | "Sweetwater Temperance" | "Années Folles" | 2:18 |
| 12. | "Enter Sandman" | "Années Folles" | 2:40 |
| 13. | "Outliers" | "Années Folles" | 2:40 |
| 14. | "Pink + White" | "Generation Loss" | 1:02 |
| 15. | "The Tower" | "Generation Loss" | 1:31 |
| 16. | "Hale's World" | "Generation Loss" | 1:07 |
| 17. | "Do You Have an Appointment?" | "Well Enough Alone" | 3:05 |
| 18. | "Knowledge" | "Zhuangzi" | 3:06 |
| 19. | "Winner Takes All" | "Que Será, Será" | 1:51 |
| 20. | "Perfect Day" | "Zhuangzi": It was used in the teaser trailer for this season. | 3:31 |
| 21. | "Wrong Exit" | "Fidelity" | 1:21 |
| 22. | "A Message" | "Fidelity" | 2:50 |
| 23. | "They Are After Your Hooch" | "Generation Loss" | 2:46 |
| 24. | "What We Are" | "Metanoia" | 3:15 |
| 25. | "No More Waiting" | "Metanoia" | 3:23 |
| 26. | "Ancient Wisdom" | "Que Será, Será" | 2:15 |
| 27. | "Host City" | "Zhuangzi" | 1:51 |
| 28. | "Watch You Grow Up" | "Que Será, Será" | 2:58 |
| 29. | "Finish What We Started" | "Generation Loss" | 3:24 |
| 30. | "Blue Dress" | "Que Será, Será" | 4:52 |
| 31. | "Pyramid Song" | "Que Será, Será" | 3:22 |
| 32. | "Set Ourselves Free" | "Que Será, Será" | 1:27 |
| 33. | "Sweetwater Reprise" | "Que Será, Será" | 0:46 |
| 34. | "Our World" | "Fidelity" | 2:58 |
| Total length: | | | 88:35 |

=== Marketing ===
A first look at footage of the season was released on December 22, 2021, in an HBO Max 2022 sizzle reel, providing glimpses of returning characters played by Ed Harris, Thandiwe Newton, and Aaron Paul. HBO told Variety that the season would air in the summer of 2022. The season received a premiere date of June 26, 2022, when its viral video trailer titled "It doesn't look like anything to me" was released in May 2022. At the 2022 ATX Television Festival, the season's tagline Adapt or Die was revealed with the season's poster as was the return of Teddy Flood, when James Marsden showed up for the show's panel.

== Reception ==
=== Critical response ===
The review aggregator Rotten Tomatoes reports an approval rating of 74% based on 58 reviews, with an average rating of 5.9/10. The website's critical consensus reads: "Westworld's continued reliance on mystery will frustrate just as much as it intrigues, but this fourth season still offers plenty of gleaming and menacing insight into a brave new world." Metacritic, which uses a weighted average, assigned a score of 64 out of 100 based on 18 critics, indicating "generally favorable" reviews.

=== Ratings ===
Viewership and ratings per episode of Westworld season 4
| No. | Title | Air date | Rating (18–49) | Viewers (millions) |
|---|---|---|---|---|
| 1 | "The Auguries" | June 26, 2022 | 0.06 | 0.325 |
| 2 | "Well Enough Alone" | July 3, 2022 | 0.05 | 0.350 |
| 3 | "Années Folles" | July 10, 2022 | 0.07 | 0.312 |
| 4 | "Generation Loss" | July 17, 2022 | 0.04 | 0.312 |
| 5 | "Zhuangzi" | July 24, 2022 | 0.07 | 0.384 |
| 6 | "Fidelity" | July 31, 2022 | 0.06 | 0.394 |
| 7 | "Metanoia" | August 7, 2022 | 0.07 | 0.321 |
| 8 | "Que Será, Será" | August 14, 2022 | 0.07 | 0.391 |
