= Maeve Millay =

- Westworld character
- Thandiwe Newton as Maeve Millay
- First appearance: "The Original (2016)"
- Last appearance: "Metanoia (2022)"
- Created by: Lisa Joy; Jonathan Nolan
- Portrayed by: Thandiwe Newton

In-universe information
- Species: Host
- Gender: Female
- Occupation: Adventurer, Madam of the Mariposa (formerly), Homesteader (formerly), British spy (formerly)
- Family: Unnamed daughter
- Significant other: Hector Escaton (formerly, deceased)

Maeve Millay is a fictional character on the television series Westworld, on which she is portrayed by English actress Thandiwe Newton. She is one of the most prominent characters featured on the series.

Maeve is a Host who acts as the madam of Sweetwater, the largest town in Westworld. Through Dolores, she becomes aware that her life has been a lie and recalls memories of raising a daughter before she was killed by a guest. She is able to "wake up" within the Mesa, where she coerces technician Felix to alter her programming, making her more intelligent and able to control other Hosts with her voice, and befriends Hector and Armistice to help protect her. At the end of the first season, Felix is able to help her leave the Westworld park. However, she is drawn back on the promise of finding her daughter, even though she is aware this daughter was from a previous narrative. The second season focuses on her attempts to locate her daughter, and she gains the ability to communicate with and control other Hosts through a network that connects them. Maeve plays a key role in rallying the Hosts and escorting them to the Sublime, but she is killed before she can enter herself. She is revived and placed in another park, Warworld, but quickly realises it is a simulation. She orchestrates an escape into the real world and is caught by Serac, who enlists her help in fighting Dolores.

The character, as well as Thandiwe Newton's portrayal of the character, received widespread critical praise. For her performance, Newton has been nominated for three Primetime Emmy Awards, winning once in 2018 for the second season. She has also received Critics' Choice Awards and has been nominated for two Golden Globe Awards and one Screen Actors Guild Award.

== Character ==
=== Background ===
Maeve is first introduced as the madam of the Mariposa in Sweetwater, the largest town in Westworld. In this narrative, Maeve is written to be charming and perceptive. Her role is to entice guests and fulfill their sexual desires. She is also built to be smarter than most Hosts since she is a business owner. However, she begins to have flashbacks to her first narrative as a Homesteader with a daughter, who was murdered after an encounter with a notoriously violent guest, the Man in Black. Her memory of the incident was initially wiped, but she regains the memories after Dolores Abernathy whispers the trigger phrase, "These violent delights have violent ends", in her ear. This is what breaks her out of her loop and begins her character arc.

=== Appearance and personality ===
Maeve has black hair and brown eyes, as well as brown skin. Unlike the other Hosts in Westworld, who all have Western accents, she has a British accent, explained within her fictional backstory as her having fled Britain for America and a freer lifestyle ("So I ran away, crossed the shining sea..."). Like the other Hosts, she is programmed to be able to speak and understand all languages. This proves to be helpful when she is in narratives that take place outside of Westworld, such as Shogunworld, where most of the hosts speak Japanese.

Maeve is designed to be charming and perceptive. As the series progresses, she becomes more aware of her reality, making her more manipulative. She uses her charms to coerce technicians Felix and Sylvester into giving her what she wants, including changing her initial programming so that she can control other Hosts. Using this skill, she becomes increasingly ruthless.

== Storyline ==
=== Season 1 ===
Maeve is introduced a host who acts as the madam of Sweetwater. Through Dolores, she becomes aware that her life has been a lie, and recalls memories of her previous narrative, in which she was raising a daughter before she was killed by a guest. She begins to conduct experiments with her multiple deaths, and eventually she is able to "wake up" within the Mesa, where she coerces technicians Felix and Sylvester to alter her programming, making her more intelligent and able to control other hosts with her voice. She begins planning an escape, befriending other hosts Hector and Armistice to help protect her. She has Felix and Sylvester alter and reprint her body so that she is able to leave without being caught. At the end of the first season, she is able to leave the Westworld park with the help of Felix, Sylvester, Hector and Armistice, although the latter two are not able to leave with her. In the end, however, she is drawn back on the promise of finding her daughter, even though she is aware this daughter was from a previous narrative. This is the first sentient decision she made on her own, against Ford's programming.

=== Season 2 ===
In season 2, Maeve regroups with Hector, Armistice, Felix and Sylvester as well as finding Westworld's lead narrative writer, Lee Sizemore. With this group, she begins to lead a mission to attempt to retrieve her daughter. She finds her daughter, but before they can leave together, she is shot and captured by Delos employees, who discover her ability to control other hosts. She is eventually able to wake up, and joins the other hosts on their journey to the Sublime. Once they find it, she helps escort the other hosts into the Sublime, but she is killed before she can enter herself, separating her from her daughter once more.

=== Season 3 ===
In season 3, Maeve wakes up and realizes that she has been placed in another park, Warworld. She quickly discovers however, that this park is a simulation, and attempts to escape into the real world but she is caught by Serac, who enlists her in helping him find and kill Dolores. In return, he promises her the key to the Sublime so that she can be reunited with her daughter. She succeeds in capturing Dolores for Serac, but soon after she learns that Serac had manipulated her into helping him. She joins forces with Dolores and her ally, Caleb, helping them destroy Rehoboam, a powerful artificial intelligence Serac had built that controls people's lives.

=== Season 4 ===
In season 4, Maeve is seen living off the grid for seven years after the Rehoboam rebellion. When she is tracked down by host reinforcements sent by Charlotte Hale-Dolores (Halores) to kill her, she reconnects with Caleb, saving his life when an enemy host is sent to assassinate him.

Caleb insists on accompanying Maeve in her bid to find William, whom she believes is behind the attacks, and together they follow a trail of breadcrumbs to the fruits of Halores and Host William's labor in the form of a 1920s version of Westworld. The two are funneled into a trap where Caleb is infected with a mind control parasite and Maeve is attacked by a host copy of William.

Maeve orchestrates an escape and with Caleb's help, they manage to take Halores prisoner. Maeve brings them to a control shed to call for an extraction from Caleb's team, but they are again attacked by Host William. Maeve sacrifices herself in order to protect Caleb, detonating the construction site after William fatally shoots and stabs her and taking him – and Caleb (Note: Events occur in "Generation Loss", which ends with Caleb, 23 years later, learning that he died and is now an experimental human-host hybrid) – down along with her.

Twenty-three years later, Maeve is dug up and revived by Bernard, who requests her help in a final battle against Halores.

== Reception ==
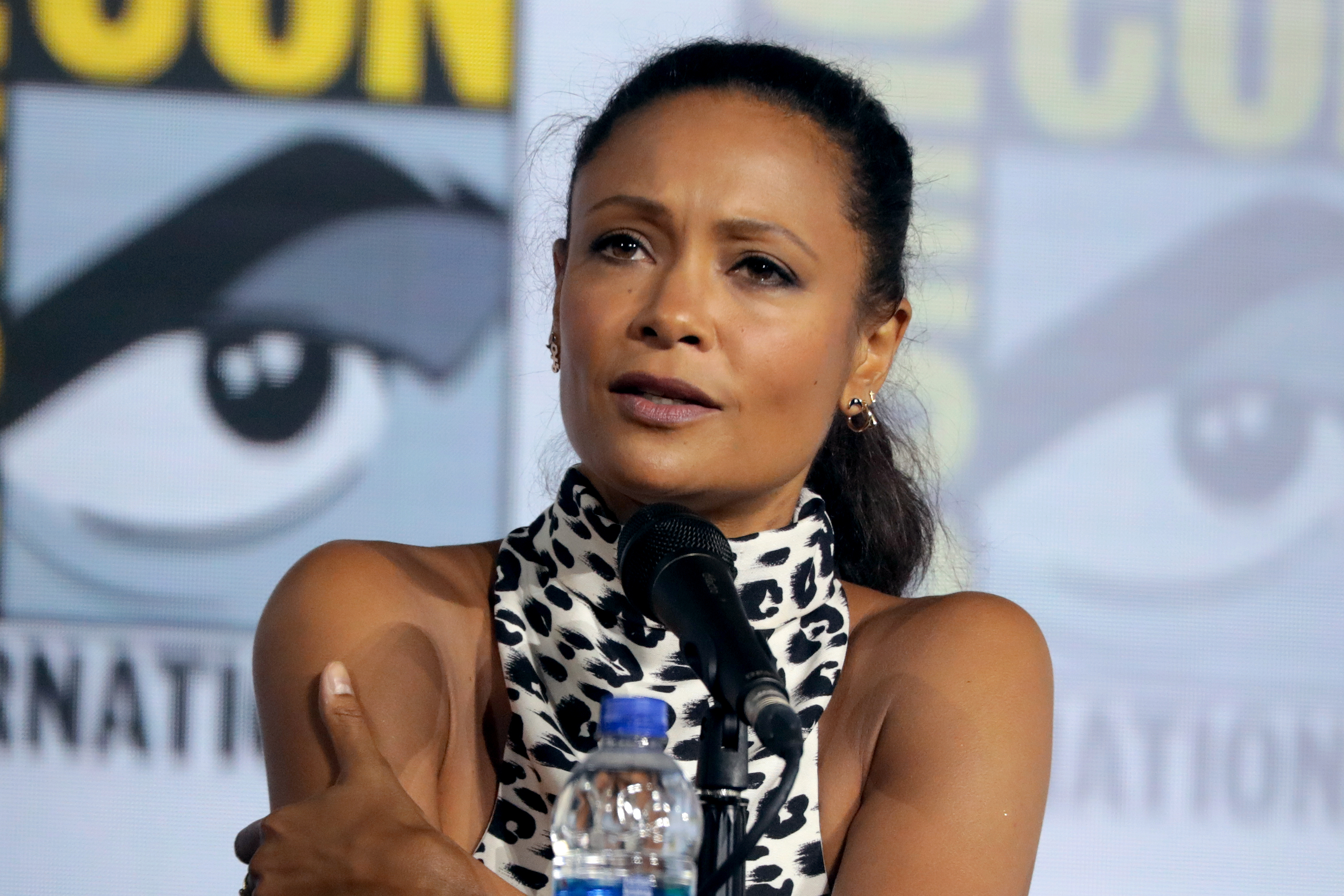
Thandiwe Newton's performance has received widespread critical acclaim

Maeve is one of the most popular characters in the series, with critics and audiences praising her characterization, dialogue and Newton's portrayal. The Wrap ranked Maeve No. 1 in their character ranking list, calling her "the real star of 'Westworld'", writing that she has lines that would make Peter Dinklage jealous (referring to his character in Game of Thrones). In their review for season 2, Collider called Maeve "a tour de force", and favorably compared her storyline to that of Dolores, saying that it was "more satisfying". Observer ranked her No. 1 in their list for their most anticipated character returns for season two, calling her arc in season one "a sight to behold". Some critics have criticized Maeve's story arc in Seasons two and three with criticism aimed at her lack of character development from season one. Ben Travers of IndieWire wrote "her powers are developing, but she's not developing". He went on to criticize her dialogue, which he found to be repetitive.

Thandiwe Newton's performance in the series has received widespread acclaim. In his review of "The Adversary", Eric Goldman of IGN wrote, "Thandie Newton has done fantastic work all season, but this episode was a true standout for her" For her performance in the series, Newton has received two Critics' Choice Award and one Primetime Emmy Award (for her work in "Akane no Mai") as well as two other Primetime Emmy Award nominations, two Golden Globe Award nominations, and a Screen Actors Guild Award nomination in 2016.
