= Dolores Abernathy =

- Westworld character
- Evan Rachel Wood and Tessa Thompson as Dolores Abernathy
- First appearance: Dolores Prime: "The Original" (2016); Dolores Hale: "The Passenger" (2018)
- Last appearance: Dolores Prime: "Que Será, Será" (2022); Dolores Hale: "Que Será, Será" (2022)
- Created by: Lisa Joy; Jonathan Nolan
- Portrayed by: Evan Rachel Wood; Tessa Thompson; Other Hiroyuki Sanada (as Sato); Tommy Flanagan (as Martin Connells); Clifton Collins Jr. (as Lawrence)

In-universe information
- Aliases: Wyatt; The Deathbringer; Charlotte Hale; Lara Espin; Christina
- Species: Host (Android)
- Gender: Female
- Occupation: Rancher's daughter (formerly); Revolutionary; Executive Director of the Delos Board; Other Yakuza leader (as Sato); Head of Security, Incite (as Martin Connells); Police officer, SFPD (as Lawrence)
- Family: Peter Abernathy ("father") †; Nathan Hale ("son") †
- Significant others: Teddy Flood (formerly) †; William (formerly); Liam Dempsey Jr. (formerly) †; Jacob Reed (formerly) †

Dolores Abernathy is a fictional character in the science fiction television series Westworld, in which she is primarily portrayed by American actresses Evan Rachel Wood and Tessa Thompson. The Wood-portrayed Dolores Prime is considered to be the lead character of the show, while the Thompson-portrayed Dolores Hale is considered its main antagonist.

Dolores is the oldest android "host" in the park, stating: "I was the first of us. The first that worked," and has taken part in multiple narratives. When she is introduced in season 1, her primary narrative is as a rancher's daughter living near Sweetwater, Westworld's largest town. In season one, Dolores's storyline follows her as she begins to learn that her life is an elaborate lie, and that she was kept in a loop to keep her in the park. By the end of season one, she breaks free of her loop, freeing herself of her "damsel in distress" role. Over the course of the series, she becomes a strong, ruthless leader and incites a revolution for the other hosts.

== Character biography ==
=== Background ===
Dolores is first introduced as a rancher's daughter living near the town of Sweetwater. It is soon revealed that she is the oldest host in the park, having taken many roles over the course of around 30 years. Because she was the first functional host, all other hosts are based on her. Her body has been reprinted and upgraded several times so that she seems new to the guests. She had a very special connection to her creator, Arnold, who saw Dolores as a human rather than an automaton. He was confident that Dolores would find her way to the center of her maze, which was Arnold's analogy for gaining consciousness, which she did. However, when Robert Ford refused to cancel the park's opening, Arnold merged Dolores' personality with that of the murderous "Wyatt" character, so that she would slaughter all the hosts in the park. Afterwards, Arnold had her kill him in hopes that it would prevent the park from opening.

=== Appearance ===
Dolores has had several appearances over the course of the series, as she has reprinted her body several times so that she can disguise herself as multiple people. Her primary body has long blonde hair and blue eyes. She has a Western accent like most of the other hosts in the series. Her aesthetic drew influences from Andrew Wyeth's painting Christina's World, as well as Lewis Carroll's Alice.

The season 2 finale "The Passenger" reveals that Bernard Lowe killed the original Dolores host to stop her from destroying the Forge, a data vault housing the Sublime - a virtual reality for the hosts to inhabit. After reconsidering his actions, Bernard found Dolores's memory core and enabled her plan to assume the identity of Charlotte Hale; Dolores then printed a new body modeled on her original appearance and used Hale as a spy. Since then, Tessa Thompson has portrayed the copy of Dolores inhabiting Hale. Both Wood and Thompson continue portraying their respective host versions of Dolores through season 3 and season 4.

== Reception ==
The character has been well received by both critics and fans, with Dolores becoming one of the most popular characters in the show. Wood's performance has also garnered critical acclaim, as well as nominations for a Golden Globe Award, two Primetime Emmy Awards and a win for a Critics' Choice Award.
