= List of Six Feet Under episodes =

Six Feet Under is an American drama television series created by Alan Ball for the premium cable network HBO. The series depicts the Fisher family, funeral directors who struggle with relationships and their own personal demons while running a small funeral home.

During the course of the series, 63 episodes of Six Feet Under aired over five seasons, between June 3, 2001, and August 21, 2005.

== Series overview ==
Season	Episodes	Originally released		Average viewers (in millions)
Season	Episodes	First released	Last released	Average viewers (in millions)
1	13	June 3, 2001	August 19, 2001	5.3
2	13	March 3, 2002	June 2, 2002	5.6
3	13	March 2, 2003	June 1, 2003	4.7
4	12	June 13, 2004	September 12, 2004	3.7
5	12	June 6, 2005	August 21, 2005	2.5

== Episodes ==
=== Season 1 (2001) ===
No. overall	No. in season	Title	Directed by	Written by	Original release date	U.S. viewers (millions)
1	1	"Pilot"	Alan Ball	Alan Ball	June 3, 2001	4.97
On Christmas Eve 2000, patriarch Nathaniel Fisher (Richard Jenkins), owner of Fisher & Sons Funeral Home, is hit and killed by a bus while driving his brand new hearse. His death throws his immediate family into emotional chaos as they attempt to deal with their grief. Nathaniel's death casts a pall over the return of his older son Nate (Peter Krause), who was hoping for a relaxing vacation before returning to his home in Seattle. On the flight, he meets and later has sex with Brenda Chenowith (Rachel Griffiths). Dutiful son David (Michael C. Hall) is struggling to keep his true sexual identity and his new boyfriend Keith (Mathew St. Patrick) from his family. Matriarch Ruth (Frances Conroy) has her own secrets to keep, while youngest child and only daughter Claire (Lauren Ambrose) has her first taste of crystal meth before finding out about Nathaniel's death and must now go through the experience while tweaking. Meanwhile, Nathaniel's spectre repeatedly appears to each member of his family and forces them to face their own anxieties about life and death.
2	2	"The Will"	Miguel Arteta	Christian Williams	June 10, 2001	3.89
Chandler Swanson, the inventor of a large-scale pyramid scheme, is killed when he hits his head on the bottom of the pool. His young widow is shocked to learn that her husband's business was actually a scam and that she has inherited massive debts. Meanwhile, the reading of Nathaniel's will drives a wedge between Nate and David when he leaves them each half of the business. Claire, angry that she must either go to college or wait until she is twenty-five to get her inheritance, starts getting closer to Gabe (Eric Balfour), the boy who got her high the night Nathaniel died and they have a close encounter involving Gabe's toe. Ruth goes on a hiking trip with her boyfriend Hiram (Ed Begley, Jr.) and decides that from now on, she does not want to be involved with the family business, leaving all the responsibility to the brothers. David reconnects with his ex-fiancee Jennifer while pushing Keith away. Brenda helps both Nate and David deal with their grief and reconnect with each other in a surprising way.
3	3	"The Foot"	John Patterson	Bruce Eric Kaplan	June 17, 2001	4.16
Thomas Romano is cut into pieces and killed when the dough mixer he is cleaning is accidentally turned on. Nate persuades the others to sell Fisher & Sons to a large chain, Kroehner International, but Nathaniel's presence gives him second thoughts. Claire is humiliated when her car is vandalized at school with phrases like "toe slut" and "this little piggy lover". She takes her revenge by stealing one of Romano's severed feet and putting it in Gabe's locker. Nate must make a choice between taking the money and running from the business he hates and fears, or staying and using his gifts to help people. He and David decide to turn down Kroehner, but their refusal has serious consequences when the large corporation plans to open a cheap cremation house just across the street. Ruth decides to have a little fun and ends up losing $25,000 betting on horse races. The family discovers that Claire stole Romano's foot and events take a surprising turn when Kroehner's new property catches on fire.
4	4	"Familia"	Lisa Cholodenko	Laurence Andries	June 24, 2001	5.68
A gang member, Manuel "Paco" Bolin is shot to death in the street by a rival gang. Fisher & Sons arranges his funeral, but Nate and David have to turn to Federico (Freddy Rodriguez), their restorative artist, to help with the interference of gang leader Powerful. Meanwhile, Nate and Brenda are questioned over the fire, but Nate is more suspicious of Claire, given her recent behavior. Ruth hosts a dinner to meet Brenda, but walks in on Brenda receiving oral sex from Nate. The police rule the fire was started by "causes unknown", letting Fisher & Sons off the hook. An incident involving Keith forces David to confront his self-loathing, and David is antagonized by the spectre of Manuel about his "run-and-hide" attitude toward life.
5	5	"An Open Book"	Kathy Bates	Alan Ball	July 1, 2001	4.64
Viveca St. John (Veronica Hart), a famous porn star, is accidentally electrocuted in her bathtub when her cat knocks her haircurlers into it. This brings much needed business to Fisher & Sons, but her unconventional circle of friends makes for an interesting funeral and shocks Ruth. Elsewhere, David is invited to be a deacon at his mother's church and this causes problems with Keith, who wants David to keep coming to church with him. Nate is introduced to Brenda's psychiatrist parents Margaret and Bernard (Joanna Cassidy and Robert Foxworth), who reveal a few of Brenda's darker secrets. Acting on the advice of Claire's guidance counselor, Ruth tries to form a closer relationship with her daughter, which does not go as planned. David comes out to Nate, but when he refuses to let Keith come to church with him, Keith accuses him of being a coward and breaks up with him and David later denies his sexuality to his brother. Nate meets Brenda's brother Billy (Jeremy Sisto), who is unstable and suffers from bipolar disorder.
6	6	"The Room"	Rodrigo García	Christian Taylor	July 8, 2001	5.29
Elderly Mildred "Hattie" Jones dies in her sleep, leaving her husband to arrange the funeral. Nate discovers some irregularities on the Fisher & Sons books, and discovers that Nathaniel used to trade funeral services for favors, such as getting marijuana from a local businesswoman and renting a room above an Indian restaurant, leading Nate to ponder just how well he really knew his father. Claire takes an interest in Billy, but when he later rejects her, she takes little comfort from Brenda's kind words. Tracy, a woman who has been aggressively pursuing David, makes him realize how lonely he is without Keith and he takes to trolling gay bars for companionship. Mr. Jones himself dies at his wife's side after her viewing and Ruth reignites her romantic relationship with Hiram the hairdresser.
7	7	"Brotherhood"	Jim McBride	Christian Williams	July 15, 2001	5.33
A young veteran, Victor Kovitch, dies from Gulf War syndrome and his brother Paul, who refuses a military service because he and Victor were fighting the Army for compensation, arranges the funeral. Nate soon discovers that Victor loved the Army and wanted a military burial but had never wanted to cause trouble with his brother. Nate and Brenda plan a trip away for the weekend, but their plans are interrupted by Billy, who is having an emotional crisis. David interviews a progressive priest for a position at the church, which forces him to consider his own place within the congregation. Ruth brings her boyfriend Hiram over for dinner and introduces him to the family, and takes a job working for Nikolai (Ed O'Ross) at his flower shop. Fisher & Sons holds a funeral for Victor without Paul's permission but Nate manages to convince Paul to give his brother the funeral he really wanted.
8	8	"Crossroads"	Allen Coulter	Laurence Andries	July 22, 2001	5.69
Chloe Yorkin puts her head out of a moving limousine's sunroof and is killed by an aerial work platform. Business is slow in the funeral business for the Fisher family, and Rico takes the opportunity to test his skills and his income by freelancing with Kroehner. Nate and David rent out their slumber room to a seniors' dance class, and David finds a short-term, drug-laced romance in the class's young male dance instructor (Steven Pasquale). Nate is angered to discover Brenda's Australian friend is staying at her home and sleeping in her bed. He gets high and blows up at Brenda but the two later apologize for their erratic behaviors toward one another. Claire gets herself kicked out of a school trip after the leader finds marijuana in her bag. She befriends a classmate, Parker, and learns that people are not always what they seem. Ruth finds herself torn between the comfort that Hiram offers her and the spirit of adventure she finds in Nikolai.
9	9	"Life's Too Short"	Jeremy Podeswa	Christian Taylor	July 29, 2001	5.82
When Gabriel's seven-year-old brother Anthony, accidentally shoots himself to death, Claire finds herself softening toward her ex-boyfriend. David hits the dance clubs with his new lover and discovers the joys of ecstasy—as does his mother, Ruth, when she takes the pills that David left in the aspirin bottle. David ends his relationship with his lover when he tries to coax him into a threesome. He later runs into Keith and his new boyfriend at a club. While under the influence of ecstasy, Ruth dreams of reuniting with her husband, Nathaniel. Brenda comes up with a scheme to improve Nate's management abilities by taking a whirlwind tour of some rival funeral homes after he flunks the funeral director's exam.
10	10	"The New Person"	Kathy Bates	Bruce Eric Kaplan	August 5, 2001	5.54
Jonathan Hanley is killed by his wife after she hits him on the head with a frying pan while he complains about work. The Fishers need to replace Rico and they hire outstanding but outspoken embalmer, Angela (Illeana Douglas). Brenda and Nate's relationship faces a mounting crisis when her brother, Billy, includes in his art exhibit a portrait of an unsuspecting Nate urinating against a wall. Finding Billy off his "meds" one time too many, Brenda's parents think he should be sent away for treatment. David orchestrates a meeting with his ex-boyfriend, Keith, which ends with David coming on to and being rejected by Keith, who is seeing someone new. Claire finds herself enmeshed in a deep relationship with Gabe, but it may be shallower than she thinks when he lies to her about going to visit his father, who Claire later finds out died when Gabe was four. David fires Angela for breaking one of his mother's wine glasses, and on her way out, Angela reveals to Ruth that David is gay. Nate tracks down Rico, and he agrees to return to Fisher & Sons temporarily because of his new-found unhappiness at Kroehner. He also informs Nate that Kroehner set the house across the street on fire in order to collect insurance money, and they are not through with their take-down of Fisher & Sons.
11	11	"The Trip"	Michael Engler	Rick Cleveland	August 12, 2001	4.33
David, Nate and Brenda attend a funeral directors' conference in Las Vegas where David successfully speaks on the role of independent funeral homes as he faced the "suits" from Kroehner. David's fellow funeral director friends pay for a female stripper to give David a lap dance, and he is forced to reveal that he is gay. He calls a male prostitute and is later arrested for having sex in public. David calls Keith to bail him out of jail. Keith is able to have the charges dropped, but he is disappointed that David was having unprotected sex with a prostitute. Brenda and Nate are disturbed to discover that Brenda's psychotic brother, Billy, followed them and broke into their hotel room to photograph them naked and asleep in bed. Meanwhile, Rico has rejoined the firm and faces a tough emotional challenge with his first client, a three-week-old infant Dillon Cooper, who died of SIDS, which causes him to worry about the impending birth of his own child. Ruth attends a class to make her flower arranging less funereal after a suggestion from Nikolai. Claire finds out that Gabe overdosed on heroin and visits him in a hospital. The episode ends with Claire and Gabe professing their love for one another, and with the birth of Rico and Vanessa's son, Augusto.
12	12	"A Private Life"	Rodrigo García	Kate Robin	August 19, 2001	6.67
The homophobic killing of Marcus Foster compels David to reassert his sexuality and re-examine his family relationships. Brenda is trying her best to break from her brother, Billy. Nate goes to pick up a body when in reality, Billy had lured him there, where he displays pictures of himself kissing Nate's sister, Claire, and of Nate and Brenda having sex. He threatens Nate with a knife, but Nate is able to escape. Brenda then breaks up with Nate, telling him she needs space. Later, Billy breaks into Brenda's home, showing her that he has removed his tattoo on his lower back of the name "Isabel" by cutting off his own skin. He tries to remove Brenda's matching tattoo, but she is able to knock him unconscious and call an ambulance. She decides to have Billy committed, and she and Nate reunite. Ruth tries to push a reluctant David into telling her he is gay. She asks her gay coworker Robbie how he came out to his mother, and he tells her that it was painful and he does not owe it to her to tell her the story. Eventually, David comes out to an accepting Ruth and a disgusted Rico. At the funeral, Keith is on patrol to protect Foster's family from homophobic rioters. David assaults one of the rioters in retaliation, and Keith covers for him. Claire is concerned that Gabe's overdose was not accidental and is concerned for his well-being.
13	13	"Knock, Knock"	Alan Ball	Alan Ball	August 19, 2001	7.06
Tracy Blair arranges a funeral for her aunt Lillian Montrose, who was accidentally killed by a golf ball. She keeps changing her mind and refusing to sign an official contract leading to a revelatory conversation with Nate. Nate and Brenda work past their problems and recommit to each other. Nikolai fires Ruth from the flower shop out of jealousy, but later they make up, passionately. David is thrust into a conflict with the other church deacons when Father Jack officiates at a lesbian wedding. Later he is verbally comforted by Keith. Claire attends a wild party with Gabriel but it seems he's becoming more unraveled. Brenda visits her brother Billy in the mental hospital. The season ends in joy as Federico holds a christening party for his son Augusto at the Fisher residence.

=== Season 2 (2002) ===
No. overall	No. in season	Title	Directed by	Written by	Original release date	U.S. viewers (millions)
14	1	"In the Game"	Rodrigo García	Alan Ball	March 3, 2002	6.24
Rebecca Milford, a young cocaine-addicted actress, overdoses and dies at the premiere party for her new horror movie. Her boyfriend knows Federico's sister-in-law. Nate and Brenda, who is still traumatized from the car accident, face some difficulties in their sex life. Claire has difficulties with Gabriel. David finds out he has gonorrhea; later he returns to Keith's church to find Keith happy with his current boyfriend. Ruth researches gay culture and holds a dinner to introduce her children and their partners to Nikolai. Nate accidentally gets high from the ecstasy in the aspirin bottle (from season 1, episode 9, "Life's Too Short") and embarrasses himself. Later, he finds out that he finally passed the licensing exam.
15	2	"Out, Out Brief Candle"	Kathy Bates	Laurence Andries	March 10, 2002	4.64
Joshua Langmead, a college football player dies of heat stroke. Ruth attends a session of a self-help group called "The Plan" with her coworker Robbie. Nate battles with keeping his arteriovenous malformation (AVM) secret but eventually tells David. Brenda stresses about having dinner with an ex-boyfriend and his new family, but they turn out to be far from perfect. The Fishers invest $20,000 on a casket wall to raise profits, much to the chagrin of Rico who had asked for a loan to buy a new home. Vanessa goes against Rico's wishes and accepts money from her sister. David and Keith get closer while spending time with Keith's drug addicted sister Karla and her neglected daughter Taylor. Claire rages at Gabriel for stealing embalming fluid from her family.
16	3	"The Plan"	Rose Troche	Kate Robin	March 17, 2002	5.68
The funeral for cancer victim Michael Piper, whose wife is a psychic, raises many interesting questions. Ruth attends "The Plan" self-help seminar and tries to make "renovations" in her life, but ends up deciding it is all nonsense and telling the whole seminar group so. David and Keith continue to bond while Keith frets about his absent addict sister and her daughter. Claire tries to help Gabriel as the cops close in on him for armed robbery but he shoots a driver in a fit of rage. As Mrs. Piper transitions her husband into the afterlife, the ghost Nathaniel questions his sons about their beliefs.
17	4	"Driving Mr. Mossback"	Michael Cuesta	Rick Cleveland	March 24, 2002	4.43
Nate and Claire travel to Seattle and stay with Nate's friend (with occasional benefits) and former co-worker Lisa before retrieving the body of Harold Mossback, 69, who died on a tour bus. Mr. Mossback's children insist that he must be driven and not flown. While there, Nate has an attack related to his AVM and reconnects with Lisa. David babysits for Keith's niece after her mother disappears. Brenda's mother becomes obsessed with her father's infidelity. Ruth tries to make amends with people from her past in line with "The Plan" with mixed results.
18	5	"The Invisible Woman"	Jeremy Podeswa	Bruce Eric Kaplan	March 31, 2002	5.37
Emily Previn, 47, a solitary woman, chokes to death in her house. Ruth takes an interest in her as she died without any family or friends. Nate continues to deflect questions about his health. Keith, in the midst of trouble with both his niece and his boyfriend, is forced to shoot a man in the line of duty. David starts to date a new man but has sex with Keith when he comes by after the shooting. Brenda has trouble starting a novel and turns to a prostitute friend for inspiration, going with her on a date. Later, Brenda asks Nate to marry her.
19	6	"In Place of Anger"	Michael Engler	Christian Taylor	April 7, 2002	6.60
Matthew Collins, 42, a drunk businessman, falls off a boat and drowns. Nikolai stays overnight with Ruth and tries to make himself part of the family. Brenda masturbates a massage client. Ruth's sister Sarah visits unannounced causing tumult throughout the family and making Ruth tremendously uncomfortable. Nate and Brenda announce their engagement to the family. The Fishers are visited for a second time by Mitzi Dalton-Huntley who offers them a huge payout to sell. Matthew's wife insists on seeing his body and reveals that he abused her.
20	7	"Back to the Garden"	Dan Attias	Joey Soloway	April 14, 2002	6.10
Jeffrey Shapiro, 38, dies from autoerotic asphyxiation while watching porn. His Jewish funeral leads Nate to question the Jewish view on death with a female rabbi. Claire visits her aunt Sarah on the weekend of a big party despite Ruth's strong misgivings. Keith dumps Eddie and starts seeing David again. His niece has an emergency appendectomy. Rico suspects his cousin Ramon is having sex with Vanessa, but when he comes home early he catches Ramon with another man. Brenda's erratic divorcing mother makes Brenda question her upcoming marriage.
21	8	"It's the Most Wonderful Time of the Year"	Alan Taylor	Scott Buck	April 21, 2002	6.97
Jesse Johnson, 57, a seasonal Santa, is killed in a motorcycle crash. His family puts on a big flamboyant Christmas funeral. Christmas signals the one year anniversary of Nathaniel's death, causing everyone to reminisce. Brenda and Nate visit Margaret and are shocked to find that Billy is living with her. Nikolai is beaten and mugged on Christmas Eve. Brenda continues having brief sexual encounters with men and writing about them. Claire brings her new boyfriend Toby to dinner but an argument causes them to break up. Keith's sister Karla returns. Nate has a seizure while with Brenda.
22	9	"Someone Else's Eyes"	Michael Cuesta	Alan Ball	April 28, 2002	6.25
Dwight Garrison, 57, a random pedestrian, is killed by a falling metal lunchbox from a high-rise construction site. His wife and daughters argue about his funeral. Nate learns through a chance meeting that Lisa is pregnant with his child while Brenda has sex with a stranger in a bathroom stall. Keith checks up on Karla finding her high again and forcing her back to rehab. Nikolai continues to recuperate at the Fisher's, inconveniencing everyone. Later Ruth discovers that he is hiding out from the gangster loan sharks who broke his legs. Claire agrees to help Billy with a project and discovers a talent for photography.
23	10	"The Secret"	Alan Poul	Bruce Eric Kaplan	May 5, 2002	5.66
Benjamin Srisai, 67, an Asian retiree, collapses and dies of a heart attack in his driveway and requires a Thai-Buddhist funeral. Nate signs away his parental rights. Nikolai finally leaves the Fishers' house. Brenda realizes that she has a problem and sees a therapist, but later she has sex with a couple at a swingers' party. Brenda's parents get back together. Karla commits a hit-and-run on a homeless man and tries to cover it up but her daughter tells David. David and Keith fight incessantly. Claire illegally takes portraits of the deceased for a school project but her work is rejected by her teacher and an incensed Nate.
24	11	"The Liar and the Whore"	Miguel Arteta	Rick Cleveland	May 12, 2002	5.79
Edith Kirky, 73, a cranky woman, is murdered by her roommate in hospice care due to Vanessa's negligence, which costs her her job. David and Keith have difficulty taking care of Taylor but refuse to let Keith's dysfunctional parents take custody. Ruth pays Nikolai's $87,000 debt, enraging him. A lawsuit from a previous client backed by Kroener turns out to be beneficial. Nate tells Brenda about Lisa's pregnancy after Rabbi Ari recommends they be honest with each other before moving forward with marriage. She later screws a pair of strangers before professing her love for Nate and forgiving him.
25	12	"I'll Take You"	Michael Engler	Joey Soloway	May 19, 2002	4.29
Leticia Perez, an 80-year-old grandmother and Rico's neighbor, dies peacefully in a salon, unexpectedly leaving $149,000 to Rico. Ruth breaks up with Nikolai, who seems not to care. David and Keith greet a social worker. Brenda's parents renew their wedding vows. Nate discovers Brenda's infidelity after reading some of her manuscript resulting in an explosive breakup. Keith beats up a suspect in a fit of anger. Lisa gives birth two weeks early to a daughter, at first shocking — then delighting — new grandmother Ruth.
26	13	"The Last Time"	Alan Ball	Kate Robin	June 2, 2002	5.49
Aaron Buchbinder, 26, an acquaintance of Nate's, dies of pancreatic cancer. In accordance with the deceased's wishes, Nate insists on witnessing the incineration of his body, and in doing so learns a few things about the process, including how pacemakers can cause the retort to sustain damage such as that which had delayed the disposition by a day, and the most efficient placement of the body in the retort. Keith gets suspended, gives Taylor to his parents, and fights with David. Fisher & Sons has an unannounced inspection allowing Rico to invest his new inheritance in the company and become a partner. Brenda goes to a sex addicts anonymous meeting. Ruth quits her job. Nate undergoes a high-risk surgery for his AVM and his family anxiously awaits the outcome as Brenda packs up her house and drives away.

=== Season 3 (2003) ===
No. overall	No. in season	Title	Directed by	Written by	Original release date	U.S. viewers (millions)
27	1	"Perfect Circles"	Rodrigo García	Alan Ball	March 2, 2003	5.09
During his surgery, Nate hallucinates various futures and alternate realities. Seven months later, Nate has recovered from his operation, is married to Lisa, and the two live with their daughter Maya. Fisher & Sons is now Fisher & Diaz. David and Keith attend couples' counseling. Ruth becomes obsessed with her granddaughter, clashing with Lisa. Nate grates against Lisa's neurotic and overbearing boss, Carol. Claire is working hard at college but believes the work is pointless. She sleeps with a crematorium worker, Phil, who also plays in a band. Keith hates his new job in security. David auditions for the Gay Men's Chorus.
28	2	"You Never Know"	Michael Cuesta	Scott Buck	March 9, 2003	5.13
Two telemarketers, Matthew Hazen and Martin Jacobs, and their manager, Andrew Milne, are gunned down by former employee Daniel Showalter, who then shoots himself dead. David and Rico are at odds over taking Showalter's body. Lisa and Nate hold a dinner for David and Keith which is crashed by Carol. Ruth comes to help her supposedly sick sister Sarah and finds Bettina (Kathy Bates) detoxing her from Vicodin. Claire gets closer to Phil romantically and befriends a classmate, Russell. Strains persist between David and Keith, while beginning to appear in Nate's marriage.
29	3	"The Eye Inside"	Michael Engler	Kate Robin	March 16, 2003	4.41
Callie Mortimer, a 19-year-old student, is accidentally struck and killed by a car. David and Keith go on a much-needed vacation and have a great time. Claire and Russell are challenged by a new teacher, Olivier. Carol blows up at Lisa, who quits her job, forcing her family to move in with Ruth. Ruth has fun at the mall with Bettina, who shoplifts several items. Claire decides she is not happy with her open relationship and breaks up with Phil.
30	4	"Nobody Sleeps"	Alan Poul	Rick Cleveland and Alan Ball	March 23, 2003	4.13
Robert Giffin, a 48-year-old gay man, dies of dilated cardiomyopathy; his lover arranges an operatic tribute. Lisa arranges a birthday dinner for Ruth despite warnings from the entire family, but Bettina shows up and hijacks her plans. David yearns for the closeness Robert had with his lover in his relationship with Keith. Nate starts showing signs of depression and worries he is becoming like his father.
31	5	"The Trap"	Jeremy Podeswa	Bruce Eric Kaplan	March 30, 2003	4.87
A hiking couple find the skeleton of 24-year-old William Jaffe who died in an accident in his car in 1975, leaving many mysteries for his remaining family. Ruth sets ground rules for new live-in apprentice Arthur (Rainn Wilson). Brenda returns to apologize to Nate. David encounters a man from his past with whom he had anonymous sex in a public bathroom . Claire and Russell get closer but their teacher, Olivier, seems to also be interested in Claire and offers her a job. Tensions between Nate and Lisa increase over money.
32	6	"Making Love Work"	Kathy Bates	Joey Soloway	April 6, 2003	5.23
Karen Pepper, age 39, dies of a nosebleed outside a television studio. Nate and Lisa take Maya camping with another family and they each independently discuss their sexual problems. Ruth enjoys spending time with Arthur. Claire and Russell get romantic. Claire and David talk about sexuality. Nate feels increasingly trapped and has a fight with Lisa.
33	7	"Timing & Space"	Nicole Holofcener	Craig Wright	April 13, 2003	3.90
Brenda's father, Bernard, dies of cancer at age 64 and Nate, who has been dreaming of Brenda, attends the funeral to Lisa's chagrin. Ruth starts to smother Arthur, even spying on him while he takes a run. David and Keith attend a brunch with members of David's chorus where Keith feels out of place. Nate and Brenda admit that they have missed each other. Claire spends a lot of time with Russell. Nate and Lisa fight about Brenda.
34	8	"Tears, Bones and Desire"	Dan Attias	Nancy Oliver	April 20, 2003	4.48
Fisher & Diaz plays home to deceased commune patriarch's many wives and children. Ruth spontaneously kisses Arthur; later they agree to just be friends but Ruth kisses him again. Keith gets his revenge on David's friends during a dramatic paintball game. Lisa, feeling curious about Brenda, books a massage with her under a false name. Olivier sends Claire on a long errand and continues to berate Russell. On her trip, Claire meets a former assistant of Olivier's and learns some interesting facts including Olivier's bisexuality as well as his tendency to sleep with students. When she returns, she quits her job. David and Keith have a spontaneous threesome.
35	9	"The Opening"	Karen Moncrieff	Kate Robin	April 27, 2003	4.62
38-year-old Melinda Bloch carefully sets her affairs in order before asphyxiating herself in her garage using her car exhaust fumes. Her husband's regrets remind Nate of his own fears and Rico of Vanessa's depression. Claire, Russell, Olivier, and Billy display their art at an alumni show. Ruth gets close with Arthur. David and Keith set ground rules on threesomes. Nate and Lisa talk about splitting up; later they unexpectedly meet up with Brenda at the art show. Lisa becomes convinced Nate is still in love with Brenda. Brenda discovers Olivier and her mother having sex. Claire suspects Russell is keeping a secret.
36	10	"Everyone Leaves"	Dan Minahan	Scott Buck	May 4, 2003	5.15
75-year-old Jeanette Bradford dies of a bee sting at a family picnic. Keith and David argue about the frequency of threesomes. Ruth discovers Arthur is a virgin. Keith confronts his homophobic father after his aunt's funeral but this just enrages him. Lisa travels to her sister's to give herself and Nate space. Claire gets a confession from Russell that he's been sleeping with Olivier and she furiously dumps him. Vanessa's multiple SSRIs ramp up her libido and she becomes manic. Brenda helps Billy leading to an awkward situation; later she visits Nate while Lisa is away and they kiss. Claire and Ruth discuss their flawed relationships. Nate discovers Lisa is missing.
37	11	"Death Works Overtime"	Dan Attias	Rick Cleveland	May 11, 2003	5.07
Fisher & Diaz is busy after three unrelated deaths: Dorothy Su who was murdered in a robbery, Edward Tully who was accidentally electrocuted while working, and David Monroe who suffered a heart attack at a gym. Vanessa is taking too many medications and is not doing well. Ruth stays optimistic about Lisa's whereabouts but Nate, alone with Maya, is increasingly panicked. David comes over to help, but he and Keith are having their own problems. Billy tells Brenda that he is in love with her. Claire is visited again by Russell who begs for forgiveness; later it is revealed that she was pregnant. Vanessa goes on an impulsive shopping spree. Ruth becomes close to George (James Cromwell), a mourner at a funeral.
38	12	"Twilight"	Kathy Bates	Craig Wright	May 18, 2003	4.66
Carl Williman, a 55-year-old serial killer, is executed in prison. His funeral causes Nate to ponder many scenarios about Lisa. He temporarily finds relief with the killer's daughter, who becomes obsessive. Claire, unable to ask her family, has Brenda take her to have an abortion. Ruth and George become engaged but David is worried they are moving too fast. George reveals that it will be his seventh marriage. Tensions between David and Keith come to a head; David sleeps with Patrick before dumping Keith.
39	13	"I'm Sorry, I'm Lost"	Alan Ball	Joey Soloway	June 1, 2003	5.78
52-year-old Anahid Hovanessian dies after being hit by falling blue ice from an airplane. Nate's behavior grows increasingly self-destructive and disturbing to his family: he screams at an upset customer and lies about it, drinks too much, has more casual sex, gets in a bar fight, and nearly kills himself. The whole family has visions of Nathaniel. Ruth and George marry after less than two months of dating. Rico, frustrated at home, goes to a strip club and receives oral sex from a dancer. Brenda goes on a date with a neighbor, Joe. David reunites with Keith after a long talk. The police call to say they have found Lisa's body.

=== Season 4 (2004) ===
No. overall	No. in season	Title	Directed by	Written by	Original release date	U.S. viewers (millions)
40	1	"Falling into Place"	Michael Cuesta	Craig Wright	June 13, 2004	4.20
In 1972, Bruno Walsh, 21, gets high, jumps off a balcony and is killed when he lands on a car. Nate, still battered from his bar fight, is tended to by Brenda; they start to have sex but stop. Claire and David are disturbed by Ruth's and George's loud sex. Claire is frustrated Nate did not attend Ruth's wedding. David accompanies Nate to claim Lisa's body. Vanessa asks her sister to leave. Nate clashes with Lisa's family over her funeral wishes. David and Keith look for ways to start over. Claire reunites with Russell but he's upset about the abortion. Nate gives Bruno's ashes to Lisa's parents, pretending they are Lisa's ashes. Nate then buries Lisa's body in accordance with her wishes.
41	2	"In Case of Rapture"	Dan Attias	Rick Cleveland	June 20, 2004	3.93
Three months later, Dorothy Sheedy, a 49-year-old deeply religious woman, mistakes floating inflated sex dolls for the rapture and, while distracted, is fatally struck by a car. Her husband's indifference to the reason irks Nate, who has been slowly improving by focusing on Maya. Arthur is openly upset by George's presence. Claire meets Anita in a boring lecture class. Brenda steps up her relationship with Joe. Keith begins a new security job protecting high-profile clients. Rico continues his fling with Sophia but it starts to get expensive. Nate quits Fisher & Diaz. David receives oral sex from a plumber and tells Keith.
42	3	"Parallel Play"	Jeremy Podeswa	Joey Soloway	June 27, 2004	3.90
Kaitlin Stolte, 14, dies suddenly at a sleepover. The Fishers hold a yard sale. David gets closer to Arthur and gives him more responsibility. Nate sleeps with a divorcee he met at his "Mommy and Me" class but is upset afterward by her stand-offish attitude. Joe has sex problems with Brenda. George starts receiving mysterious packages of feces; Ruth suspects Arthur, who is so offended by her accusation that he quits. At a party, Claire discovers her classmate Edie is a lesbian.
43	4	"Can I Come Up Now?"	Dan Minahan	Alan Ball	July 11, 2004	3.63
Lawrence Mason, 65, is struck and killed by lightning. His daughter is David's ex-fiancée, and she asks him to arrange the funeral. Later she lashes out at David for breaking her heart. Claire starts dating Jimmy, a classmate. George reveals he has an estranged second son, Kyle, who has been sending the excrement. Ruth is disturbed and arranges an unsuccessful reunion. Joe and Brenda try some domination role play but Nate shows up unexpectedly. He later has an unusual rendezvous with a psychic who tells him that Lisa is not dead. Claire realizes she has never had an orgasm.
44	5	"That's My Dog"	Alan Poul	Scott Buck	July 18, 2004	3.66
Anne Thornton, 38, dies falling in the shower on her anniversary. David is forced on a horrifying ride by a crazed, crackhead hitchhiker. He is beaten, tied up, forced to smoke crack, and nearly killed. Nate attends a bereavement support group but gets little out of it. Ruth plays matchmaker to George's son Kyle, greatly annoying George. Sophia shows up at Fisher & Diaz, terrifying Rico.
45	6	"Terror Starts at Home"	Miguel Arteta	Kate Robin	July 25, 2004	3.80
Robert Meinhardt, 42, is murdered in a home invasion. Ruth plans a birthday dinner for David, who is traumatized in the aftermath of his ordeal but has not told the family the extent of what happened. Ruth goes to a faculty dinner with George and overhears more than she would like about George's former women, and they have a fight. Claire does AMT with some friends and shows up to David's party high. Vanessa begins to suspect Rico's infidelity. David has a panic attack and calls emergency services; he later tells Claire the full truth about his abduction. Nate starts working with dogs at a canine retreat but Claire begs him to come back and help David. Brenda visits Nate and they kiss.
46	7	"The Dare"	Peter Webber	Bruce Eric Kaplan	August 1, 2004	3.49
Joan Morrison, 65, dies rapidly of stomach cancer. David insists Claire stop babysitting him but he is still shaky. Brenda and Nate continue having sex. Ruth becomes increasingly obsessed with George's secrets. She and George go fossil hunting, but take an unexpected detour to see her sister and Bettina, with whom George is very antisocial. David continues to suffer from PTSD. Keith comes out to his coworker buddy. Rico breaks things off with Sophia, but Vanessa follows him to her house. She leaves him and Rico goes back to Sophia. Nate sleeps with his former coworker but has dreams of Lisa. Claire decides to have sex with Edie. Brenda admits her infidelity to Joe.
47	8	"Coming and Going"	Dan Attias	Nancy Oliver	August 8, 2004	3.95
James Marshall, 81, dies in his car in the Fishers' driveway, pre-need form at the ready. Rico and Ruth come to melting points in their marriages. Vanessa attacks Sophia and wrecks her car. George thoughtlessly prunes Ruth's favorite tree to death. Claire gets comfortable with Edie, but realizes she is straight. After seeing Edie's orgasm, she becomes determined to have one herself. Keith finds solace with his client, Celeste, while David sleeps with Sarge. Both encounters end badly. Claire and David, becoming increasingly close, share their recent embarrassing love stories. Brenda and Nate take Maya to a playground; later Joe catches them in bed and leaves. Ruth leaves for parts unknown.
48	9	"Grinding the Corn"	Alan Caso	Rick Cleveland	August 15, 2004	3.30
Lawrence Tuttle, 35, an avid comic book collector, is crushed to death by hundreds of his own comics. Keith tells David about Celeste. Edie refuses to speak to Claire. Nate and Brenda continue having sex but are conflicted about their relationship. Ruth and Bettina travel to Mexico and Ruth faces down a rude motel worker. Billy takes over Claire's and Russell's class. Lawrence's friends try to steal a comic from his coffin. George seems indifferent to Ruth's absence, but later starts showing signs of severe depression. Brenda almost slips into old habits; later she attends a Sex Addicts Anonymous meeting. Claire experiences her first orgasm with the help of classmate Jimmy using the coital alignment technique.
49	10	"The Black Forest"	Peter Care	Joey Soloway & Craig Wright	August 22, 2004	3.36
Robert Wething, 46, dies of alcohol poisoning outside a party. His widow battles anger and grief. David tentatively discusses marriage with Keith. Ruth does not want to leave Bettina's; later she reconciles with George while establishing some ground rules. Nate, Brenda, and Maya attend a memorial service for Lisa in Idaho. The funeral director expresses doubts about the authenticity of 'Lisa's' ashes. Brenda's patient, Byron, deteriorates. Vanessa introduces Rico to her new boyfriend. David and Keith go to the commitment ceremony of a gay couple. Claire and Edie clash at Jimmy's party. George and Kyle argue about the apocalypse and George starts to become obsessed.
50	11	"Bomb Shelter"	Nicole Holofcener	Scott Buck	August 29, 2004	3.53
Four members of the Gorodetsky family, Edward, Coco, and their children Michael and Amanda are killed in a car accident, leaving behind a teenage son with no relatives to help him plan the funeral. Brenda's mother Margaret has to have an emergency hysterectomy. Claire and Russell argue about credit for a project. George becomes increasingly paranoid about Armageddon; he discovers the Fisher's bomb shelter and starts to stockpile provisions in it. Claire is invited to put her new photos in a professional exhibition. Ruth wants to attend a sex workshop; George agrees but later forgets. David and Keith face a lawsuit; Keith sleeps with the plaintiff to make it go away. Lisa's sister Barb confronts Nate about 'Lisa's' ashes, and he admits the truth. Barb threatens to take custody of Maya.
51	12	"Untitled"	Alan Ball	Nancy Oliver	September 12, 2004	3.73
Kenneth Henderson, 50, is killed by an elevator's doors closing on him. Nate is highly paranoid about Barb's threat, causing stress between Nate and Brenda. Ruth discovers George's biggest secret during a lunch with his daughter, Maggie. David confronts his carjacker who is deranged and confused, leaving him with little closure. Rico apologizes to Vanessa, who accepts but still asks for a divorce. Claire starts doing cocaine and sacrifices her friendships with Anita, Russell, and Jimmy for fame at the art show; later she sleeps with Billy. George starts hallucinating and sleeping in the bomb shelter. David receives a delayed message from Michaela. Nate discovers that Hoyt and Lisa had been lovers, and that he met with her on the day of her death.

=== Season 5 (2005) ===
No. overall	No. in season	Title	Directed by	Written by	Original release date	U.S. viewers (millions)
52	1	"A Coat of White Primer"	Rodrigo García	Kate Robin	June 6, 2005	2.62
Andrea Kuhn, 41, is accidentally killed by her husband. Nate and Brenda, who is pregnant, prepare for their wedding. Billy asks Claire to move in with him. Rico starts dating again. Ruth is unenthusiastic about George's return home after being institutionalized for depressive psychosis and undergoing ECT, which impaired his memory. David and Keith begin the adoption process but also consider surrogacy. Brenda has a miscarriage and she and Nate react in different ways. Ruth loses her cool and slaps Claire at the wedding.
53	2	"Dancing for Me"	Dan Attias	Scott Buck	June 13, 2005	2.10
Samuel Hoviak, 39, a high school friend of Nate's, dies in a freak accident in his driveway. Claire's mentor does not like her new photographs. Nate hangs out with a friend from high school who makes a disturbing admission. David asks Claire to donate her eggs to him and Keith. Brenda starts an internship at a free clinic. Maggie gives Ruth much needed relief caring for George. Billy starts feeling frustrated at his lack of artistic inspiration and decides to discontinue his antipsychotic medication, flushing it down the toilet.
54	3	"Hold My Hand"	Jeremy Podeswa	Nancy Oliver	June 20, 2005	1.92
Loretta Sibley, 45, George's mother, commits suicide in front of him in 1953; in the present he becomes increasingly confused. Brenda takes on difficult new clients. David's old arrest prevents him and Keith from being able to adopt. Rico meets Angela at a conference and they hit it off. Claire is excited by Billy's new-found lust for life after secretly discontinuing his medication, but his behavior starts to become erratic. George is haunted by visions of his mother's death and asks Maggie to arrange more shock treatments. Maggie hits it off with Nate and Maya at a family dinner. Ruth and Claire are at odds over Claire's inheritance money and lifestyle.
55	4	"Time Flies"	Alan Poul	Craig Wright	June 27, 2005	2.19
Lila Coolidge, 96, dies on the toilet. Billy deteriorates and becomes obsessive. Ruth finds friends in a knitting circle. On Nate's fortieth birthday, Brenda learns that she is pregnant again. She throws a surprise party for him that ultimately goes awry when they fight. David and Keith "propose" to a potential surrogate. Ruth and Maggie clash over George. Rico and Vanessa get back together. George and Billy discuss mental illness. Nate, depressed and frustrated, explodes in front of his family when a bird flies into the house. George expresses his anguish to Ruth. Claire sleeps with a 40-something divorcee and then fights with Billy, dumping him.
56	5	"Eat a Peach"	Dan Minahan	Rick Cleveland	July 4, 2005	1.50
Daniel Holzenchenko, 66, dies from diabetic complications and the family argue over his funeral. Ruth finds a way to relax without George. David and Keith consider adopting a child named Anthony, but then their surrogate claims she is pregnant; later she gets her period. David and Keith decide to adopt Anthony and his older brother. Nate and Brenda consider giving Maya a coherent narrative. Margaret tricks Claire into an ambush meeting with Billy, but she rejects him and leaves. Rico and Vanessa argue after Julio bullies another child at school. Nate and Brenda host Maggie and George for dinner.
57	6	"The Rainbow of Her Reasons"	Mary Harron	Joey Soloway	July 10, 2005	2.23
Fiona Kleinschmidt, 53, and Sarah's friend, dies from a fall in Topanga Canyon; Sarah visits with the bad news, feeling guilty. Her friends have a party. Ruth and George move into 'their' new house - only Ruth has no intention of living there; it has all been a deception to move George into separate accommodation without him resisting. Billy becomes obsessed with Claire. Claire starts temping. David and Keith encounter difficulties in disciplining their new foster children. Vanessa hires a nanny when her actress sister gets picked up by a sitcom but it does not go well; later she invites Rico to move back in.
58	7	"The Silence"	Joshua Marston	Bruce Eric Kaplan	July 17, 2005	2.29
Peter Burns, 57, dies suddenly of a heart attack in a theater. David and Keith struggle to create boundaries for their new foster sons. Brenda and Nate receive some ambiguous news about the baby, splitting them further apart. George wants an immediate divorce as he is already re-engaged; Ruth tells his new fiancée all about his problems. Claire starts socializing with her coworkers leading to an awkward situation. Ruth fills her schedule with activities; she goes to a friend's fancy party and has a terrible time.
59	8	"Singing for Our Lives"	Matt Shakman	Scott Buck	July 24, 2005	2.46
Pilar Sandoval, 35, is struck and killed by a car while rollerblading. Claire starts a relationship with a coworker named Ted. David attempts to make a bid on a crematorium, Nate wants to start selling eco-conscious funerals, even altering his own funeral arrangements to reflect his eco-consciousness, and Federico pushes for another employee. Claire runs into Anita who invites her to her new show where she sees Russell, Jimmy, Anita, and Olivier. Ruth tries to babysit Anthony and Durrell but it's a disaster. Brenda receives information from her doctor. Nate begins attending Quaker services with Maggie, to the chagrin of Brenda. Ruth spends time with her ex-boyfriend, Hiram. While visiting Maggie's house, Nate sleeps with her but afterward suffers a massive stroke.
60	9	"Ecotone"	Dan Minahan	Nancy Oliver	July 31, 2005	2.54
Laurence Matheson, 34, is killed by a mountain lion while jogging in the hills. Claire discovers her new boyfriend, Ted, is a Republican. After his stroke, Nate is taken to the hospital. As word spreads about his condition, his family starts to panic. While Nate undergoes urgent surgery, tension ensues between Maggie and Brenda in the waiting room. Ruth is still camping with Hiram in the wilderness and is oblivious to what is happening with her family in L.A. Nate's surgery goes well and he wakes from his coma sooner than expected, though he remains partially paralysed. Reaching clarity through visions he experienced while unconscious, he calmly breaks up with Brenda. David stays with Nate in the hospital, but wakes to find he has died.
61	10	"All Alone"	Adam Davidson	Kate Robin	August 7, 2005	2.85
The family mourns Nate's death. Ruth weeps and hallucinates; Bettina shows up to help. Claire is horrified when she sees Nate's body; she calls Ted. Brenda tries to address Maya's confusion. David becomes manic, stops sleeping, and experiences PTSD symptoms. Maggie gets a door shut in her face. Nate's funeral divides the family. David copes with running the family business without Nate. Keith makes an embarrassing discovery on the job. Brenda is taunted by Nate's image and makes a painful decision about what to do with Maya. Rico, David, and George all speak at the funeral. David has multiple panic attacks. Nate is buried in the same manner in which he had buried Lisa, in accordance with his eco-conscious views.
62	11	"Static"	Michael Cuesta	Craig Wright	August 14, 2005	3.25
Paul Duncan, 22, a triple amputee, kills himself with an injection in his hospital bed. As David's fears take over, Keith tries to protect him and the boys. Claire loses her job and Ted. Visions of Nate compel Brenda to make a decision about her relationship with Billy, who is supporting her. George helps Ruth with Maya. Claire's grief causes her to drink heavily and hallucinate while at Nate's gravesite; she speeds while driving and flips her hearse, totaling it. Rico pushes for a talk about the business. Maggie explodes at her father and leaves. Brenda takes Maya back from Ruth. Brenda's water breaks.
63	12	"Everyone's Waiting"	Alan Ball	Alan Ball	August 21, 2005	3.89
Brenda delivers Willa two months early at 2 lb 4 oz (1.02 kg) with several health problems. She worries about Willa while Nate (in a vision) is constantly negative. Keith evicts David for the children's sake; David moves back home, where Ruth cares for him. Claire gets an unexpected job offer in New York City. Rico convinces David to sell Fisher & Diaz, but Nathaniel Sr. chastises him in his dreams, causing him to embrace his demons and change his mind about selling the business. Margaret is impressed to see Olivier's nurturing side. Rico and Vanessa celebrate an investment. Ruth and Claire finally make peace and Ruth insists she follow her dreams; Claire's job offer falls through but Nate convinces her to move to New York City anyway. The family toasts Nate's memory at a farewell dinner for Claire. Claire's departure reveals what is to come for her family. Brenda remarries and cares for Maya and Willa; David and Keith marry; Durrell is interested in embalming; Rico and Vanessa stay together; Ruth dies in 2025 at age 79; Keith is shot to death in 2029 at age 61; Claire marries Ted; David dies in 2044 at age 75; Rico dies in 2049 at age 75; Brenda dies in 2051 at age 82; Claire dies in 2085 at age 101. "Breathe Me" by Sia is played throughout final montage.

== Ratings ==
Six Feet Under : U.S. viewers per episode (millions)

Season	Episode number													Average
Season	1	2	3	4	5	6	7	8	9	10	11	12	13	Average
1	4.97	3.89	4.16	5.86	4.64	5.29	5.33	5.69	5.82	5.54	4.33	6.67	7.06	5.3
2	6.24	4.64	5.68	4.43	5.37	6.60	6.10	6.97	6.25	5.66	5.79	4.29	5.49	5.6
3	5.09	5.13	4.41	4.13	4.87	5.23	3.90	4.48	4.62	5.15	5.07	4.66	5.78	4.7
4	4.20	3.93	3.90	3.63	3.66	3.80	3.49	3.95	3.30	3.36	3.53	3.73	–	3.7
5	2.62	2.10	1.92	2.19	1.50	2.23	2.29	2.46	2.54	2.85	3.25	3.89	–	2.5

Audience measurement performed by Nielsen Media Research
