= The New Person =

- Six Feet Under episode
- Episode no.: Season 1 Episode 10
- Directed by: Kathy Bates
- Written by: Bruce Eric Kaplan
- Cinematography by: Alan Caso
- Editing by: Tanya Swerling
- Original release date: August 5, 2001
- Running time: 60 minutes

Guest appearances
- Joanna Cassidy as Margaret Chenowith; Robert Foxworth as Bernard Chenowith; Illeana Douglas as Angela; Ed O'Ross as Nikolai; Eric Balfour as Gabe; Dina Spybey as Tracy Montrose Blair; Jed Allan as Dr. Feinberg; John Billingsley as Jonathan Hanley; Timm Sharp as Andy

Episode chronology
← Previous "Life's Too Short"	Next → "The Trip"

"The New Person" is the tenth episode of the first season of the American drama television series Six Feet Under. The episode was written by supervising producer Bruce Eric Kaplan, and directed by Kathy Bates. It originally aired on HBO on August 5, 2001.

The series is set in Los Angeles, and depicts the lives of the Fisher family, who run a funeral home, along with their friends and lovers. It explores the conflicts that arise after the family's patriarch, Nathaniel, dies in a car accident. In the episode, David and Nate hire a new embalmer, while Claire continues her relationship with Gabe. Meanwhile, Nate is concerned that Brenda sacrificed her future to take care of Billy.

According to Nielsen Media Research, the episode was seen by an estimated 5.54 million household viewers and gained a Nielsen household rating of 3.6. The episode received positive reviews from critics, with praise towards the performances (particularly Michael C. Hall), writing and character development.

== Plot ==
Jonathan Hanley complains about his work, while his wife is cooking breakfast. Mid-sentence, he is killed when she hits him with a frying pan, fed up with his complaining. She subsequently starts eating breakfast. She is later arrested, and she claims she killed him as he was "boring."

With Federico (Freddy Rodriguez) out, David (Michael C. Hall) and Nate (Peter Krause) decide it is time to find a new embalmer. After conducting interviews, they decide to hire a woman named Angela (Illeana Douglas). She is an expert in the field, but they are bothered by her outspoken personality. Claire (Lauren Ambrose) has resumed her relationship with Gabe (Eric Balfour), helping him moving on from Anthony's death. Gabe apologizes for his mistreatment, and Claire also protects Gabe from other bullies at school. However, she is left confused when he starts skipping school and does not answer her phone calls, claiming he will visit his father.

Nate and Brenda (Rachel Griffiths) visit an art gallery where Billy (Jeremy Sisto) displays some of his photographs. Nate is bothered by her parents' attitude, while Brenda expresses disdain for Dr. Gareth Feinberg, who publicized works about her. Nate is angered to learn that one of the portraits is Nate urinating on a wall, unaware that he was followed by Billy. When Brenda supports Billy, Nate angrily leaves. At her house, Brenda tells Nate that she sacrificed her future to take care of Billy, who tried to commit suicide when she was younger, abandoning her life at Yale University for him. After getting a fight with Brenda, Billy breaks into Feinberg's office to destroy all the files he has on Brenda, while insulting his parents for not supporting him. Margaret (Joanna Cassidy) asks Brenda to help convince Billy to get committed to a institution, revealing that he did not try to kill himself; Billy actually set the house on fire while making a bomb, shocking her.

David starts daydreaming about multiple sexual encounters with strangers. While helping the church in serving food to homeless people, he finds that Keith (Mathew St. Patrick) is also volunteering and decides to join him. They reconcile and they kiss at Keith's apartment, but Keith makes it clear he is fine with his new boyfriend. A disappointed David leaves, contacting a phone sex service. Ruth (Frances Conroy) discovers that Angela broke one of her mother's wine glasses, and she ends up fired. On her way out, Angela laments the state of the family, and reveals David's homosexuality to Ruth. Nate then visits Federico, who is unhappy with his new job at Kroehner. He agrees to return to Fisher & Sons, although Nate cannot promise he can be a partner. Federico informs Nate that Kroehner set the house across the street on fire in order to collect insurance money, and they are not through with their take-down of Fisher & Sons. Claire visits Gabe's mother to know his whereabouts, and discovers that he lied about his visit, given that his father died years ago.

== Production ==
=== Development ===
The episode was written by supervising producer Bruce Eric Kaplan, and directed by Kathy Bates. This was Kaplan's second writing credit, and Bates' second directing credit.

== Reception ==
=== Viewers ===
In its original American broadcast, "The New Person" was seen by an estimated 5.54 million household viewers with a household rating of 3.6. This means that it was seen by 3.6% of the nation's estimated households, and was watched by 3.70 million households. This was a 5% decrease in viewership from the previous episode, which was watched by 5.82 million household viewers with a household rating of 3.8.

=== Critical reviews ===
"The New Person" received positive reviews from critics. John Teti of The A.V. Club wrote, "So, the question is whether Gabe killed himself or ran away. The fact that Gabe said he was going to see his (dead) father suggests the former. But there's evidence in the other direction, too. Why would he clear out his locker unless he were packing up to go somewhere? And the episode already featured one story of suicide that turns out to be a misdirection, so it figures that there might be another."

Entertainment Weekly gave the episode a "B+" grade, and wrote, "Douglas' Emmy-nominated guest turn immediately injects the often-morose drama with new life, as does a fantasy musical sequence that allows Cabaret alum Hall to show off his song-and-dance skills." Mark Zimmer of Digitally Obsessed gave the episode a 3.5 out of 5 rating, writing "Things get really weird with Margaret Chenowith, who is in fine form, gleefully and incestuously creepy. The stiff this time is a terminally boring salesman offed by his wife with a frying pan (shades of Maggie and Jiggs)."

TV Tome gave the episode a 7 out of 10 rating and wrote "Fans of the musical moments on the series will be pleased to see Michael .C. Hall's little Caberet style number around the beginning of the episode." Billie Doux of Doux Reviews gave the episode a 3 out of 4 stars and wrote "Billy's exhibition was brilliant, visceral, inappropriate, and sick, and so was he. And so was his mother. Billy and Margaret were like self-absorbed human hand grenades." Television Without Pity gave the episode a "B+" grade.

In 2016, Ross Bonaime of Paste ranked it 35th out of all 63 Six Feet Under episodes and wrote, "For the Fishers, “The New Person” might be one of the first times where the family gets so close, to the point where anyone else brought into the house is soon driven away. Rico's replacement Angela seems like a good idea at first, but then the whole family agrees they need her to leave. David brings Keith back home, but when he comes on too strong, Keith leaves this aggressive David alone. In spite of the messiness of it all, it's great to see the Fishers coming together as a team, not only up against Angela, but also when David and Nate both cover for Claire's adventures with Gabe. They're even there, helping her out when she gets her heart broken. Unfortunately, while the Fisher family grows closer, the Chenowiths pull apart, as they're torn between whether or not Billy should be sent to an institution. Again."

=== Accolades ===
For the episode, Illeana Douglas received a nomination for Outstanding Guest Actress in a Drama Series at the 54th Primetime Emmy Awards. She would lose to Patricia Clarkson, who also guest starred and won for the series.
