= Life's Too Short (Six Feet Under) =

- Six Feet Under episode
- Episode no.: Season 1 Episode 9
- Directed by: Jeremy Podeswa
- Written by: Christian Taylor
- Cinematography by: Alan Caso
- Editing by: Michael Ruscio
- Original release date: July 29, 2001
- Running time: 60 minutes

Guest appearances
- Ed Begley Jr. as Hiram Gunderson; Richard Jenkins as Nathaniel Fisher Sr.; Ed O'Ross as Nikolai; Eric Balfour as Gabe; Marina Black as Parker; Steven Pasquale as Kurt; Timm Sharp as Andy; Wendy Schaal as Vickie Dimas

Episode chronology
| ← Previous "Crossroads" | Next → "The New Person" |

"Life's Too Short" is the ninth episode of the first season of the American drama television series Six Feet Under. The episode was written by producer Christian Taylor, and directed by Jeremy Podeswa. It originally aired on HBO on July 29, 2001.

The series is set in Los Angeles, and depicts the lives of the Fisher family, who run a funeral home, along with their friends and lovers. It explores the conflicts that arise after the family's patriarch, Nathaniel, dies in a car accident. In the episode, Claire is shocked when she finds that Gabe's little brother accidentally killed himself. Meanwhile, David starts using ecstasy, and Ruth goes on a camping trip with Hiram.

According to Nielsen Media Research, the episode was seen by an estimated 5.82 million household viewers and gained a Nielsen household rating of 3.8, making it the most watched episode of the series by then. The episode received positive reviews from critics, who praised the performances, subject matter and character development.

== Plot ==
Gabe (Eric Balfour) invites a friend, Andy (Timm Sharp), to come over to his house, kicking his six-year-old brother Anthony out of the room so they can use drugs. Anthony decides to check his mother's room, going through her drawer. Suddenly, Gabe and Andy hear a noise coming from the room, and are shocked to find that Anthony accidentally shot himself with a gun.

With Federico out of Fisher & Sons, David (Michael C. Hall) is now forced to replace him in the morgue. He continues his relationship with Kurt (Steven Pasquale), and is surprised when he introduces him to ecstasy. Nate (Peter Krause) finds that he failed the test to get his funeral director's licence. To help Nate gain a new perspective on how funeral businesses operate, Brenda (Rachel Griffiths) decides to take her to many funeral homes in the city, pretending they want a funeral service. Nate is surprised when two different homes prioritize profit over the family's grief, and is later shocked when Brenda pretends to be a dying cancer patient. While Nate is angry with her stunt, he comes to understand that he must help people in moving past death.

Gabe and his mother, Vickie (Wendy Schaal), visit Fisher & Sons to arrange Anthony's funeral. Noticing Gabe, Claire (Lauren Ambrose) consoles him when she finds out about the tragedy, even though Parker (Marina Black) tells her to avoid Gabe. Ruth (Frances Conroy) goes on a camping trip with Hiram (Ed Begley Jr.). Hiram hopes they can rekindle their sexual life prior to Nathaniel's death, but Ruth deviates his advances. She takes aspirin, unaware that she took David's ecstasy pills. She is guided by a man in a bear costume to a hearse, where Nathaniel (Richard Jenkins) awaits her. Finding his gravestone, she realizes she must continue with her life. When she regains consciousness, she finds that she had passionate sex with Hiram.

Kurt takes David to a gay nightclub, running into Keith (Mathew St. Patrick) and his new boyfriend. When Kurt suggests having a threesome with David and another man, David finally decides to break up with him. At Anthony's funeral, Gabe's estranged father crashes the venue and punches Gabe, blaming him for Anthony's death. Nate restrains the father and gets him to a separate room, calling him out for no longer being part of his child's life. Gabe reconciles with Claire, making it clear he does not support the bullying and humiliation she received. The episode ends as Claire consoles a grieving Gabe.

== Production ==
=== Development ===
The episode was written by producer Christian Taylor, and directed by Jeremy Podeswa. This was Taylor's second writing credit, and Podeswa's first directing credit.

== Reception ==
=== Viewers ===
In its original American broadcast, "Life's Too Short" was seen by an estimated 5.82 million household viewers with a household rating of 3.8. This means that it was seen by 3.8% of the nation's estimated households, and was watched by 3.85 million households. This was a slight increase in viewership from the previous episode, which was watched by 5.69 million household viewers with a household rating of 3.7.

=== Critical reviews ===
"Life's Too Short" received positive reviews from critics. John Teti of The A.V. Club wrote, "Gabe can't apologize enough to make a dent in his overwhelming guilt. Previously free to check out from the world on a regular basis, Gabe now faces the reality of life — or, more to the point, of death — at every moment. Yes, he had been acting like kind of a fuck-up, but he's also 16 years old. This was his time to screw up, and in time he would ease into those bigger questions. Events have placed him on an accelerated schedule, and it's not clear what happens to him, the brother who survives, from here. The whiplash of the tragedy is extraordinarily devastating for such a young soul."

Entertainment Weekly gave the episode a "C" grade, and wrote, "Life's too short to subject yourself to such a supremely depressing episode. Even his brother's death doesn't generate much sympathy for the inherently unlikable Gabe. And when Ruth unwittingly (but predictably) takes one tab of X on a camping trip, the hour's only ostensible dose of humor proves a major buzz kill." Mark Zimmer of Digitally Obsessed gave the episode a 4 out of 5 rating, writing "Things get a little preachy when dad shows up, but on the whole a well-done episode."

TV Tome gave the episode a 9 out of 10 rating and wrote "After two hokey episodes we're back onto unforgettable and insighful stuff here with this delighful piece." Billie Doux of Doux Reviews gave the episode a perfect 4 out of 4 stars and wrote "I sometimes find Brenda's immaturity irritating, but I loved her unconventional approach to problem-solving. My favorite part of this episode was Brenda dragging Nate along to make undercover evaluations of the services of other funeral homes, mostly because she was doing it in order to help Nate." Television Without Pity gave the episode a "B+" grade.

In 2016, Ross Bonaime of Paste ranked it 21st out of all 63 Six Feet Under episodes and wrote, "“Life's Too Short” begins with one of the series' bleakest openings, as Gabe's six-year-old brother accidentally shoots himself. However, the show counterbalances this tragedy with some of the series' funniest moments so far. Brenda and Nate test out various funeral homes to see what Fisher & Sons is getting right, and Ruth goes on a camping adventure that turns into an unintentional ecstasy trip. “Life's Too Short” presents the simple idea that we should cherish every day while we have it, but without being overt and cheesy about it. Incorporating those dark moments and that dark humor creates an excellent balance that would continually work for the series."
