= The Trip (Six Feet Under) =

- Six Feet Under episode
- Episode no.: Season 1 Episode 11
- Directed by: Michael Engler
- Written by: Rick Cleveland
- Cinematography by: Alan Caso
- Editing by: Christopher Nelson; Michael Ruscio
- Original release date: August 12, 2001
- Running time: 60 minutes

Guest appearances
- Ed O'Ross as Nikolai; Mary Gross as Floral Instructor; Eric Balfour as Gabe; Justina Machado as Vanessa Diaz; Michelle Ruben as Amber

Episode chronology
← Previous "The New Person"	Next → "A Private Life"

"The Trip" is the eleventh episode of the first season of the American drama television series Six Feet Under. The episode was written by producer Rick Cleveland, and directed by Michael Engler. It originally aired on HBO on August 12, 2001.

The series is set in Los Angeles, and depicts the lives of the Fisher family, who run a funeral home, along with their friends and lovers. It explores the conflicts that arise after the family's patriarch, Nathaniel, dies in a car accident. In the episode, David, Nate and Brenda go to a conference in Las Vegas, while Federico deals with an infant's funeral. Meanwhile, Ruth fights to keep her place at the flower shop, while Claire tries to get Gabe to open up with her.

According to Nielsen Media Research, the episode was seen by an estimated 4.33 million household viewers and gained a Nielsen household rating of 4.0. The episode received positive reviews from critics, who praised the themes and performances, although some had mixed reactions to Billy's actions in the episode.

== Plot ==
Two parents check on their baby, Dillon, with the father noting that he looks different. The mother sings a lullaby to Dillon and subsequently leaves, but the baby dies soon after from SIDS while staring at the crib mobile.

David (Michael C. Hall) and Nate (Peter Krause) prepare to leave for the Western States Funeral Directors Conference in Las Vegas. Needing a break from Billy (Jeremy Sisto), Brenda (Rachel Griffiths) decides to join them. While Nate wants to use the opportunity to slam Gilardi, David advices him in not doing it, as they could face libel. They are annoyed when they discover that Gilardi has used Federico's work for his presentation without crediting him. David's presentation gets low attendance, and some even falling sleep. Furious, he deviates from his notes, using the chance to discredit Kroehner and use Nathaniel as a good influence. David's speech earns high praise from other funeral directors, who take him to a strip club. During this, Nate and Brenda tour Las Vegas, but Brenda is upset when she finds that Billy made his way to the city.

Claire (Lauren Ambrose) visits Gabe (Eric Balfour) at a hospital in Barstow after discovering he overdosed on heroin. Gabe dismisses her attempts in consoling him, but Claire is still intent in visiting him, whether he wants her or not. Ruth (Frances Conroy) is still confused after discovering David's homosexuality, and is further dismayed when Nikolai (Ed O'Ross) demotes her to the cash register after her flower arrangements lead to customers complaining that they are funereal. She undergoes a class to learn the propel model, eventually achieving it. With David and Nate out, Federico (Freddy Rodriguez) must take care of Dillon's case. Federico is left shaken of the baby's death, as it coincides with the upcoming birth of his son.

David's partners get him a lap dance, but he finally reveals his homosexuality. Looking for some company, he hires a male prostitute and they have sex in a parking lot. However, they are caught by the police and subsequently arrested for public sex. He is bailed out the following day by Keith (Mathew St. Patrick), who was David's only phone call. Keith gets David's records clean, but tells him to find help. David then leaves with Nate and Brenda, not telling them of his arrest. Back home, Nate and Brenda admire their photos and are disturbed to find that Billy broke into their room and photographed them naked and asleep in bed. At the hospital, Claire once again visits Gabe, and they both proclaim their love for each other. Federico accompanies his wife Vanessa (Justina Machado) to the hospital, where she gives birth to their son, Augusto.

== Production ==
=== Development ===
The episode was written by producer Rick Cleveland, and directed by Michael Engler. This was Cleveland's first writing credit, and Engler's first directing credit.

== Reception ==
=== Viewers ===
In its original American broadcast, "The Trip" was seen by an estimated 4.33 million household viewers with a household rating of 4.0. This means that it was seen by 4.0% of the nation's estimated households, and was watched by 4.09 million households. This was a 22% decrease in viewership from the previous episode, which was watched by 5.54 million household viewers with a household rating of 3.6.

=== Critical reviews ===
"The Trip" received positive reviews from critics. John Teti of The A.V. Club wrote, "In the operating room, after Vanessa undergoes an emergency C-section, Rico's face contorts with joy and relief. This one is meant for this world after all, and Augusto Diaz gets his beginning."

Entertainment Weekly gave the episode a "B–" grade, and wrote, "Billy's psycho routine is growing tiresome, and it's too soon after Gabe's brother to go back to the dead-kid well. But Hall turns David's anti-Kroehner rant at the convention into a tour de force, and his encounter with a buxom lap dancer is a hoot." Mark Zimmer of Digitally Obsessed gave the episode a 3.5 out of 5 rating, writing "Ruth has difficulty in dealing with David's homosexuality, or more specifically his reticence about it, and tries to move beyond funereal flower arranging. David is having a hard time with his sexuality himself, which erupts into some bad moments in Vegas. The stiff this time is an infant dead of SIDS, which causes some emotional difficulties in the home."

TV Tome gave the episode an 8 out of 10 rating and wrote "It's really the action in Las Vegas that will keeps viewers hooked though as Nate, David and Brenda attend a funeral director's conference." Billie Doux of Doux Reviews gave the episode a 3 out of 4 stars and wrote "It would have been perfect... except for Billy stalking Brenda and taking photos of Brenda and Nate asleep in bed. And did that show us where Billy's head was at, or what? He is so in love with Brenda. And Brenda was reaching her breaking point. Way past time, too. Billy could kill someone." Television Without Pity gave the episode an "A–" grade.

In 2016, Ross Bonaime of Paste ranked it 30th out of all 63 Six Feet Under episodes and wrote, "“The Trip” offers the characters on Six Feet Under some intense highs as well as incredibly low lows. On a trip to Las Vegas for a funeral director's conference, David stands up, once again, to Kroener... but is then arrested for having sex with a prostitute in public. Nate and Brenda take a much-needed vacation which seems like a fantastic idea, until they realize that Billy is stalking them. Meanwhile, back home, Claire finally finds Gabe, discovers that he's overdosed, admits she loves him and dives right into a terrible relationship choice, while Rico has to prepare a baby for a funeral—a task made even more difficult because his own baby is on the way. As the first season nears its end, “The Trip” begins to put pieces into place for the climatic season finale."

=== Accolades ===
Freddy Rodriguez and Lauren Ambrose submitted the episode to support their nominations for Outstanding Supporting Actor in a Drama Series and Outstanding Supporting Actress in a Drama Series at the 54th Primetime Emmy Awards. They would respectively lose to John Spencer and Stockard Channing for The West Wing.
