= The Last Time (Six Feet Under) =

- Six Feet Under episode
- Episode no.: Season 2 Episode 13
- Directed by: Alan Ball
- Written by: Kate Robin
- Cinematography by: Alan Caso
- Editing by: Michael Ruscio
- Original release date: June 2, 2002
- Running time: 59 minutes

Guest appearances
- Lili Taylor as Lisa Kimmel; Glenn Fitzgerald as Aaron Buchbinder; Ed O'Ross as Nikolai; Larry Drake as Inspector Gerson; Justina Machado as Vanessa Diaz; Marina Black as Parker McKenna; Grant Show as Scott Axelrod; Geoffrey Nauffts as Dr. DiPaolo; Deirdre O'Connell as LAC Arts Interviewer; J.P. Pitoc as Crematory Guy; Daniel Roebuck as Male Sex Addict

Episode chronology
← Previous "I'll Take You"	Next → "Perfect Circles"

"The Last Time" is the thirteenth episode and season finale of the second season of the American drama television series Six Feet Under. It is the 26th overall episode of the series and was written by Kate Robin, and directed by series creator Alan Ball. It originally aired on HBO on June 2, 2002.

The series is set in Los Angeles, and depicts the lives of the Fisher family, who run a funeral home, along with their friends and lovers. It explores the conflicts that arise after the family's patriarch, Nathaniel, dies in a car accident. In the episode, Nate finds that he needs an emergency surgery, while David feels alienated by Keith's behavior. Meanwhile, Claire applies for art school, while Brenda begins attending sex addict anonymous meetings.

According to Nielsen Media Research, the episode was seen by an estimated 5.49 million household viewers and gained a Nielsen household rating of 3.4. The episode received critical acclaim, who praised the performances, emotional tone, character development and directing.

== Plot ==
Nate (Peter Krause) is upset when he finds that Ruth (Frances Conroy) reveals she has visited Maya, telling her to stay out of her life and storms off. He decides to visit Aaron (Glenn Fitzgerald), whose pancreatic cancer has worsened. Nate comforts a dying Aaron, telling him to "let it go."

David (Michael C. Hall) is shocked to find that Keith (Mathew St. Patrick) allowed his parents to take custody of Taylor and move her to San Diego, as he feels the incident will ruin the custody battle. Along with his suspension, Keith begins to ignore David. Kroehner sends an inspector to check on Fisher & Sons, as a last attempt to hit back. The inspector finds irregularities in the drainage system and gives them two weeks to replace it, and they lack the money to do that. As the business may have to close for some time, David and Nate tell Federico (Freddy Rodriguez) that he should consider a new job.

Nate visits a doctor to schedule an embolization, and the doctor informs him that his latest seizure led to his AVM rupturing. Nate needs cranial surgery, and while the doctor claims to have a good record, he warns that death is a possibility. In accordance with Aaron's wishes, Nate insists on witnessing the incineration of his body, and in doing so learns a few things about the process, including how pacemakers can cause the retort to sustain damage such as that which had delayed the disposition by a day, and the most efficient placement of the body in the retort. When he returns home, Lisa (Lili Taylor) visits with Maya, and Nate holds her for the first time.

Brenda (Rachel Griffiths) attends a sex addicts anonymous group, where she takes an interest in a man, Scott Axelrod (Grant Show). She invites him home, where he explains that his addiction led to a sexual harassment lawsuit at his own firm. This encounter gets her to open up to Nate and apologize for her actions, claiming that this simply reinforced her love for him. She wants to be with him for the surgery, but Nate tells him not to do it and focus on herself. Nate also gives his pre-arranged funeral document to David, in case anything goes wrong during surgery. When David expresses his concerns with Keith, they get into a fight when Keith appears to lack interest. They reconcile by having sex.

Ruth decides to quit the flower shop, feeling that Nikolai (Ed O'Ross) is not interested in being her friend. Federico agrees to lend part of the $149,000 to David and Nate to maintain the business, but asking for a 25% stake, which they reluctantly accept. Claire (Lauren Ambrose) applies for LAC Arts, explaining that her interest in art started as a form of dealing with Nathaniel's death. David and Claire subsequently decide to accompany Ruth during Nate's surgery, skipping her graduation ceremony. Brenda packs her house and then leaves Los Angeles. A head-shaven Nate is taken to the surgery room, where he is given anesthesia. He imagines himself jogging in a highway, when an empty bus pulls over next to him, leaving him thinking over whether to board or not.

== Production ==
=== Development ===
The episode was written by Kate Robin, and directed by series creator Alan Ball. This was Robin's third writing credit, and Ball's third directing credit.

== Reception ==
=== Viewers ===
In its original American broadcast, "The Last Time" was seen by an estimated 5.49 million household viewers with a household rating of 3.4. This means that it was seen by 3.4% of the nation's estimated households, and was watched by 3.62 million households. This was a 27% increase in viewership from the previous episode, which was watched by 4.29 million household viewers with a household rating of 2.7.

=== Critical reviews ===
"The Last Time" received critical acclaim. John Teti of The A.V. Club wrote, "After searching so hard for the answers in life, is it time to move on and find answers in death? Or does the search itself carry meaning? To put it another way, does he get on the bus at long last, or does he keep running? As Nate stands there, stilled by indecision, the screen fades to white before he can choose — suggesting that perhaps the choice itself is an illusion anyway."

Entertainment Weekly gave the episode an "A" grade, and wrote, "Not as emotionally tumultuous as the preceding ep, but the ensemble's at its best as everyone copes with Nate's surgery. A lovely reminder that this show, which often plays like a comedy, can also be unexpectedly moving." Mark Zimmer of Digitally Obsessed gave the episode a perfect 5 out of 5 rating, writing "It wouldn't be the last episode of the season without some sort of cliff-hanger, and "The Last Time" certainly provides that in the potential death of a main character, even if we have our suspicions as to the result. In an episode that's filled with careful camera placement and interesting movement, the two major fantasy sequences (Claire's interview and Nate's vision as his anesthesia takes effect) are especially striking, and two of the best sequences of all of Six Feet Under. Although it's a bit somber, this is a great episode, and a fitting finish to Season 2."

TV Tome gave the episode a 9 out of 10 rating and wrote "Definitely better than the first season's ender and more than a satisfying way to end this amazing second year of the show. Here's your proof cynics, Six Feet Under is here to stay." Billie Doux of Doux Reviews gave the episode a perfect 4 out of 4 stars and wrote "At the end of the first season, Nate discovered that he could be dying. Here, at the end of season two, they left us with Nate going under anesthesia, a white light, and the Bus of Death stopping to pick him up. I love Nate, dammit, and I hate this. I don't want him to die. Maybe he's just flirting with death. Nate is a chronic flirt, after all." Television Without Pity gave the episode an "A" grade.

In 2016, Ross Bonaime of Paste ranked it 7th out of all 63 Six Feet Under episodes and wrote, "Nate saying goodbye in “The Last Time” is a collection of truly heartbreaking moments as he undergoes AVM surgery. He first bids farewell to his new friend Aaron, who dies in front of him, terrified that there's no light to head into. Then he wraps things up with Brenda, as the two of them go their separate ways — Brenda is desperate to not let him go, since it could be the last time she sees him. But it's when Nate says goodbye to Ruth that it all becomes just too much for him, and he breaks down into tears over how unprepared he is for the situation. “The Last Time” also gives us the wonderful moment when Claire and David decide that they'd rather be waiting in the hospital with their mother for news of Nate, rather than attending Claire’s graduation. Despite how disparate they might be most of the time, “The Last Time” gives us one more beautiful example of just how strong the Fisher family can be when one of them really needs it."

Brian Ford Sullivan of The Futon Critic named the episode as fourth best episode of 2002, writing, "After a season that dared us to hate virtually every character on the show (I mean how many scenes did we need of Brenda shagging yet another guy behind Nate's back?), Six Feet Under rebounded with a stellar finale that harkened back to the series' best moments. Nate (the always fantastic Peter Krause) stole the show in this one: from a gut-wrenching scene in which a friend literally dies in front of his eyes to the haunting image of himself, head shaven, being wheeled into the operating room, the show went out with all the promise and pathos it started with last year."
