= Six Feet Under, Vol. 2: Everything Ends =

Soundtrack album by Various Artists
- Released: June 21, 2005
- Genres: Soundtrack, Indie rock, Alternative
- Length: 51:56
- Label: Astralwerks

Professional ratings
Review scores
Source	Rating
Allmusic	3/5 stars

Six Feet Under, Vol. 2: Everything Ends is a soundtrack album to the HBO drama series Six Feet Under, released in 2005 on Astralwerks. This album was nominated for the Grammy Award for Best Compilation Soundtrack for Visual Media in 2006, and was chosen as number 96 of Amazon.com's Top 100 Editor's Picks of 2005.

== Track listing ==
No.	Title	Artist	Length
1.	"Feeling Good"	Nina Simone	2:53
2.	"Amazing Life"	Jem	4:02
3.	"Everything Is Everything" (featured in "Coming and Going" where Claire and company are discussing their upcoming art project)	Phoenix	3:00
4.	"A Rush of Blood to the Head" (plays at the end of "Perfect Circles")	Coldplay	5:50
5.	"Breathe Me" (A much-extended version plays under the closing montage in "Everyone's Waiting")	Sia	4:31
6.	"Lucky" (featured in "Parallel Play")	Radiohead	4:17
7.	"Time Is on My Side" (plays at the start of "Perfect Circles")	Irma Thomas	2:50
8.	"Aganjú (The Latin Project Remix)"	Bebel Gilberto	4:07
9.	"Direction" (featured briefly in "Static" when Claire drives to the nature preserve to visit Nate's grave)	Interpol	3:54
10.	"(Don't Fear) The Reaper" (featured in "It's the Most Wonderful Time of the Year")	Caesars	4:14
11.	"Transatlanticism" (featured in "Terror Starts at Home")	Death Cab for Cutie	7:55
12.	"Cold Wind" (featured in "Static")	Arcade Fire	3:24
13.	"I'm a Lonely Little Petunia (In an Onion Patch)" (featured in "The Dare")	Imogen Heap	0:59
