= Crossroads (Six Feet Under) =

- Six Feet Under episode
- Episode no.: Season 1 Episode 8
- Directed by: Allen Coulter
- Written by: Laurence Andries
- Cinematography by: Alan Caso
- Editing by: Christopher Nelson
- Original release date: July 22, 2001
- Running time: 57 minutes

Guest appearances
- Ed Begley Jr. as Hiram Gunderson; Ed O'Ross as Nikolai; Marina Black as Parker; Steven Pasquale as Kurt; Stewart Finlay-McLennan as Connor; Michael Cudlitz as Crossroads Leader

Episode chronology
← Previous "Brotherhood"	Next → "Life's Too Short"

"Crossroads" is the eighth episode of the first season of the American drama television series Six Feet Under. The episode was written by producer Laurence Andries, and directed by Allen Coulter. It originally aired on HBO on July 22, 2001.

The series is set in Los Angeles, and depicts the lives of the Fisher family, who run a funeral home, along with their friends and lovers. It explores the conflicts that arise after the family's patriarch, Nathaniel, dies in a car accident. In the episode, Nate meets Brenda's Australian friend, while David starts a relationship with a dance instructor. Meanwhile, Claire goes on a hiking trip, while Ruth notices the different lifestyles of Nikolai and Hiram.

According to Nielsen Media Research, the episode was seen by an estimated 5.69 million household viewers and gained a Nielsen household rating of 3.7, making it the most watched episode of the series by then. The episode received positive reviews from critics, who praised the pacing, directing, and character development.

== Plot ==
At a limousine, Chloe Yorkin drinks with her friends after breaking up with her husband, whom she believes is now having an affair with an old graduate student. Drunk, she decides to climb to the limo's sunroof to celebrate. She is unaware that an aerial work platform is overhead, and dies after hitting it.

Business is slow at Fisher & Sons, and David (Michael C. Hall) hopes Nate (Peter Krause) can use the time to study and earn his license to become funeral director. Nate decides to use the slumber room for seniors' dance class, which David actually approves. David takes a particular interest in the dance instructor, Kurt (Steven Pasquale), and agrees to go on a date with him. Federico (Freddy Rodriguez) decides to assist Kroehner in the morgue with Chloe's corpse, but states this will be just one time. He claims to Nate that he is taking care of his wife, but Nate knows he is lying after calling her. When Nate and David confront him, Federico says he wants to be a partner at business just to feel like he belongs in Fisher & Sons.

Claire (Lauren Ambrose) goes on a school trip for a hiking journey. She is uninterested in following the instructions of the crossroads leader, Dennis (Michael Cudlitz), and prefers to hang out with her friend Topher, to whom she sold marijuana. She befriends a classmate, Parker, only to find her having sex with Dennis. Parker then pushes Dennis to let Claire lead the group, but the group ends up deviating from their route. Dennis kicks Claire and Parker out of the trip, while also discovering she carried marijuana. Claire is also dismayed to learn that Topher actually has hiking experience, having done it since he was 14. Ruth (Frances Conroy) finds that working for Nikolai (Ed O'Ross) is not as ideal as she expected, while also debating over her time with Hiram (Ed Begley Jr.).

While visiting Brenda (Rachel Griffiths), Nate is shocked to find her Australian friend, Connor (Stewart Finlay-McLennan), naked. He is staying with her, but she claims nothing is happening between them. Annoyed by his presence, he decides to smoke marijuana with Billy (Jeremy Sisto). Under the influence, he accuses Brenda of lying about her past, causing her to kick him out. He returns the following day to apologize, finding that she asked Connor to leave, and they reconcile. After dining, David and Kurt end up having sex. Federico visits Nate and David to discuss the partnership, but after realizing they never discussed it, decides to accept Kroehner's full-time offer. Claire returns home, lamenting that the people she knew were never honest, just as David prepares to provide funeral service to a family.

== Production ==
=== Development ===
The episode was written by producer Laurence Andries, and directed by Allen Coulter. This was Andries' second writing credit, and Coulter's first directing credit.

== Reception ==
=== Viewers ===
In its original American broadcast, "Crossroads" was seen by an estimated 5.69 million household viewers with a household rating of 3.7. This means that it was seen by 3.7% of the nation's estimated households, and was watched by 3.78 million households. This was a 6% increase in viewership from the previous episode, which was watched by 5.33 million household viewers with a household rating of 3.5.

=== Critical reviews ===
"Crossroads" received positive reviews from critics. John Teti of The A.V. Club wrote, "“It just didn't work out,” David says. “Life goes on.” A bus has overturned on the freeway, which means bodies, so the day-to-day noise is about to start up again. David welcomes the distraction: “There's work to be done.”"

Entertainment Weekly gave the episode an "A" grade, and wrote, "One of the series' richest hours ever: Among the myriad highlights are Nate's drug-fueled meltdown over Brenda's exhibitionistic ex-boyfriend and Ruth's sexual fantasy about Nikolai as a conquering cossack. Coulter's seamless direction rivals his finest work on The Sopranos." Mark Zimmer of Digitally Obsessed gave the episode a 3.5 out of 5 rating, writing "Highly involving and entertaining throughout."

TV Tome gave the episode an 8 out of 10 rating and wrote "The girls manage to get talking and realise that their preconceptions of one another aren't as accurate as they were lead to believe by other people's thoughts - Claire's kinda normal and Parker is something of a DangerSlut. I never would have guessed. There is also the blossoming of the triangle with Hiram, Ruth and Nikolai, but not much of interest happens here involving that particular thread. Well, there is always the next episode." Billie Doux of Doux Reviews gave the episode 3 out of 4 stars and wrote "I loved the irreverent Nate in a lounge chair in front of the funeral home, half naked and getting a tan. David sat next to him, wearing a suit, quizzing Nate on questions for the funeral director's exam. A perfect visual portrait of the internal differences between the two of them." Television Without Pity gave the episode a "B+" grade.

In 2016, Ross Bonaime of Paste ranked it 54th out of all 63 Six Feet Under episodes and wrote, "While on a camping trip in “Crossroads,” Claire decides to purposely take a wrong path. Claire knows that she's intentionally doing something wrong, but everyone else in “Crossroads” unknowingly heads down roads which they don't quite realize are bad for them. Nate is far too paranoid about Brenda as she tries to unwind with old friends, David dates a dance instructor that is clearly not right for him and Ruth can't decide which of the two men in her life she wants to date. But it's Rico's big change that is the most important here, as he takes a job at Fisher & Sons' competitor Kroener, as a way to set up his own independence from the company that he believes he can never be a part of."
