= Brotherhood (Six Feet Under) =

- Six Feet Under episode
- Episode no.: Season 1 Episode 7
- Directed by: Jim McBride
- Written by: Christian Williams
- Cinematography by: Alan Caso
- Editing by: Tanya Swerling
- Original release date: July 15, 2001
- Running time: 51 minutes

Guest appearances
- Ed Begley Jr. as Hiram Gunderson; Ed O'Ross as Nikolai; Wade Williams as Paul Kovitch; Raphael Sbarge as Father Clark; Brian Kimmet as Victor Kovitch; Frank Birney as Walter Kriegenthaler; Tim Maculan as Father Jack

Episode chronology
← Previous "The Room"	Next → "Crossroads"

"Brotherhood" is the seventh episode of the first season of the American drama television series Six Feet Under. The episode was written by co-executive producer Christian Williams, and directed by Jim McBride. It originally aired on HBO on July 15, 2001.

The series is set in Los Angeles, and depicts the lives of the Fisher family, who run a funeral home, along with their friends and lovers. It explores the conflicts that arise after the family's patriarch, Nathaniel, dies in a car accident. In the episode, Fisher & Sons tend a man who wants a funeral for his military brother, but not wanting a military service. Meanwhile, David questions his new role at the church.

According to Nielsen Media Research, the episode was seen by an estimated 5.33 million household viewers and gained a Nielsen household rating of 3.5. The episode received mixed reviews from critics, who found the themes too heavy-handed.

== Plot ==
Private First Class Victor Kovitch (Brian Kimmet) sends a video log to his parents from his base, detailing all his activities. Years later, Victor is now bedridden while watching the video log. When his brother Paul (Wade Williams) comes with a new tape to watch, he is aghast to learn that Victor has died from Gulf War syndrome.

After telling her he loves her, Nate (Peter Krause) tells Brenda (Rachel Griffiths) that they will go on a weekend getaway to a spa resort. As they have sex, Billy (Jeremy Sisto) walks in the room, making them uncomfortable. Later, when Nate arrives for the trip, he decides to leave when Billy stays around so Brenda can take care of him. At a church meeting, David (Michael C. Hall) is informed that they need to settle on an associate priest. He interviews a progressive priest, Father Clark (Raphael Sbarge), for a position at the church, which forces him to consider his own place within the congregation. Clark does not get the position, and David talks with Father Jack (Tim Maculan) over the purpose of the church.

Paul meets with David and Nate to arrange the funeral for Victor, after having tried to bring attention over his Gulf War syndrome. Due to this, he also refuses a military service because he and Victor were fighting the Army for compensation. Nate soon discovers that Victor loved the Army and wanted a military burial but had never wanted to cause trouble with his brother. When Paul is informed, he breaks down after realizing how little he knew his brother. Ruth (Frances Conroy) takes Hiram (Ed Begley Jr.) to dine with her family, while announcing that she has decided to work at a flower shop owned by Nikolai (Ed O'Ross).

== Production ==
=== Development ===
The episode was written by co-executive producer Christian Williams, and directed by Jim McBride. This was Williams' second writing credit, and McBride's first directing credit.

== Reception ==
=== Viewers ===
In its original American broadcast, "Brotherhood" was seen by an estimated 5.33 million household viewers with a household rating of 3.5. This means that it was seen by 3.5% of the nation's estimated households, and was watched by 3.59 million households. This was a slight increase in viewership from the previous episode, which was watched by 5.29 million household viewers with a household rating of 3.7.

=== Critical reviews ===
"Brotherhood" received mixed reviews from critics. John Teti of The A.V. Club wrote, "One question that runs throughout the episode is whether Paul really is oblivious to Victor's wishes or if he is simply choosing not to acknowledge them out of spite for the institution that, to his eyes, destroyed his brother's life. Paul's stubbornness leads us to believe the latter. It turns out, though, that Paul really was unaware, and he's heartbroken by the realization."

Entertainment Weekly gave the episode a "C+" grade, and wrote, "A preachy tone overwhelms this low-key and largely uneventful episode. Brenda's travails with needy brother Billy are taking screen time away from the Fishers; one dysfunctional family is enough, thanks." Mark Zimmer of Digitally Obsessed gave the episode a 2 out of 5 rating, writing "This is one of the weakest episodes in the set, with Nate excessively intruding into the personal life of the deceased, making everything better in a drippy Touched by an Angel moment, totally at odds with the dark and cynical flavor of the series otherwise."

TV Tome gave the episode an 8 out of 10 rating and wrote "Speaking of David, I'm disappointed in his decision to go with moral (but clearly backward) majority and veto the hiring of a progressive young priest with a liberal attitude so desperately needed more in certain churches and US States these days. It also doesn't take a genius to discover that Father Jack not only knows of David's sexuality but is also gay himself, especially with his disappointment of David's decision." Billie Doux of Doux Reviews gave the episode 3 out of 4 stars and wrote "With a title like "Brotherhood," it had to be about siblings. At the beginning of this episode, Nate and David were still at each other's throats. In the end, Nate told David he loved him." Television Without Pity gave the episode a "B" grade.

In 2016, Ross Bonaime of Paste ranked it 39th out of all 63 Six Feet Under episodes and wrote, "True to its title, this episode is especially concerned with the love between siblings. Nate fights for a Gulf War Syndrome soldier to get the funeral he wanted, but one his brother refuses to give him. He also, finally, tells David that he loves him after weeks of arguments. Nate also tells Brenda that he loves her, and their growing bond sends Billy into a tailspin. But it's also an episode about the future, as Ruth continues her relationship with Hiram, David does what he believes to be best for the church and Claire begins to weigh her options for the next phase of her life. “Brotherhood” stands out as a first-season episode that really sets up how these characters we're growing to love will act from here on out: Nate will stand for a cause, David will do so as well — just more conservatively — and Claire will continue to confusedly try to figure herself out."
