= The Foot (Six Feet Under) =

- Six Feet Under episode
- Episode no.: Season 1 Episode 3
- Directed by: John Patterson
- Written by: Bruce Eric Kaplan
- Cinematography by: Bruce Douglas Johnson
- Editing by: Michael Ruscio
- Original release date: June 17, 2001
- Running time: 53 minutes

Guest appearances
- Caroline Aaron as Amelia; Richard Jenkins as Nathaniel Fisher Sr.

Episode chronology
← Previous "The Will"	Next → "Familia"

"The Foot" is the third episode of the first season of the American drama television series Six Feet Under. The episode was written by supervising producer Bruce Eric Kaplan, and directed by John Patterson. It originally aired on HBO on June 17, 2001.

The series is set in Los Angeles, and depicts the lives of the Fisher family, who run a funeral home, along with their friends and lovers. It explores the conflicts that arise after the family's patriarch, Nathaniel, dies in a car accident. In the episode, the Fishers face a rival funeral service, which plans to buy a property right next to them. Meanwhile, Claire discovers that Gabe exposed their sexual encounters to the school.

According to Nielsen Media Research, the episode was seen by an estimated 4.16 million household viewers and gained Nielsen household rating of 2.8. The episode received positive reviews from critics, who praised it for its humor and ending.

== Plot ==
At a bread company, a man named Thomas Romano (John Capodice) introduces a young boy to his new job, which consists of cleaning a dough mixer. As Romano enters the mixer to show him, the assistant gets distracted by a bug in his hand. He accidentally turns on the mixer, causing Romano to be killed after being cut into pieces.

Nate (Peter Krause) believes that the family must sell Fisher & Sons to a large chain, Kroehner International, as a representative, Matthew Gilardi (Gary Hershberger) is interested in their business. However, David Fisher (Michael C. Hall) and Ruth (Frances Conroy) oppose, while Nate is also haunted by the presence of Nathaniel (Richard Jenkins). Nate also wants to leave for Seattle with Brenda (Rachel Griffiths), but is still hesitant on abandoning the family business. Fed up with the constant fights between her children, Ruth decides to spend the day with her friend, Amelia (Caroline Aaron), on a horse track. Despite having fun, Ruth ends up losing $25,000 on a race.

At school, Claire (Lauren Ambrose) is mocked by her classmates after Gabe (Eric Balfour) confides to a friend that she sucked his toe, to the point that her car is graffitied. Humiliated, she confronts Gabe, who also finds the jokes around her amusing. After consideration, Nate and David decide to turn down Kroehner, but their refusal has serious consequences when the large corporation plans to open a cheap cremation house just across the street. This, coupled with their recent debts, suggest Fisher & Sons could face bankruptcy. Nate then decides to get more involved in the services, including recovering the chopped pieces of Romano's body. However, Nate, David and Federico (Freddy Rodriguez) realize that Romano's foot is missing and nowhere to be found in the morgue.

Eventually, it is discovered that Claire took the foot and placed it in Gabe's locker as revenge. This gets the police involved, but Keith (Mathew St. Patrick) interferes to prevent Claire from facing charges. He later helps her in locating the foot at a park, but they are unable to find it. With the funeral service approaching, Federico uses a bone of meat to replace Romano's missing foot. That night, Claire tells the family that they will not have to deal with the Kroehner house in front of them; the house has been caught on fire, to their shock. The following day, a woman takes her dog for a walk and is shocked when the dog retrieves Romano's missing foot.

== Production ==
=== Development ===
The episode was written by supervising producer Bruce Eric Kaplan, and directed by John Patterson. This was Kaplan's first writing credit, and Patterson's first directing credit.

== Reception ==
=== Viewers ===
In its original American broadcast, "The Foot" was seen by an estimated 4.16 million household viewers with a household rating of 2.8. This means that it was seen by 2.8% of the nation's estimated households, and was watched by 2.88 million households. This was a 6% increase in viewership from the previous episode, which was watched by 3.89 million household viewers with a household rating of 2.5.

=== Critical reviews ===
"The Foot" received positive reviews from critics. John Teti of The A.V. Club wrote, "The most significant character moment for me is Nate's vision of Nathaniel as he drives home from a meeting with Kroehner. It's always a pleasure to have Richard Jenkins make an appearance as Nathaniel, and he's hilarious during Nate's meeting with slimy, double-speaking Gilardi."

Entertainment Weekly gave the episode a "B" grade, and wrote, "The script gets considerable comic mileage out of the toe business, but a subplot about Ruth losing $25,000 at the track goes nowhere." Mark Zimmer of Digitally Obsessed gave the episode a perfect 5 out of 5 rating, writing "Some broad slapstick humor combined with the usual mordant wit makes this a real gem."

TV Tome gave the episode an 8 out of 10 rating and wrote "the episode is laced up with some truly slapstick comedy and mayhem as Federico comes up with a rather devious way of hiding the fact the deceased's foot is missing from his family who demand a closer inspection of the reassembled corpse. Yes, I'm sure it's a tad illegal but that doesn't stop it from being so damn funny." Billie Doux of Doux Reviews gave the episode 3 out of 4 stars and wrote "The whole thing with Kroehner, the merchants of death, was amusing at first. But it got somewhat disturbing when Kroehner immediately started carrying out their threats. Even worse than losing business and suppliers and dealing with unexpected health inspections was their attempt recruit away the exceptionally talented Rico. Could the Fishers even make it without Rico?" Television Without Pity gave the episode a "B–" grade.

In 2016, Ross Bonaime of Paste ranked it 43rd out of all 63 Six Feet Under episodes and wrote, "“The Foot” is iconic for fans of the show, but like the quick musical interlude at the beginning of the episode, Six Feet Under would get better as it went on, combining those moments of harsh reality with segments that could release the tension."
