= Familia (Six Feet Under) =

- Six Feet Under episode
- Episode no.: Season 1 Episode 4
- Directed by: Lisa Cholodenko
- Written by: Laurence Andries
- Cinematography by: Bruce Douglas Johnson; Frederick Iannone
- Editing by: Sue Blainey
- Original release date: June 24, 2001
- Running time: 52 minutes

Guest appearances
- Jacob Vargas as Manuel "Paco" Bolin; Lombardo Boyar as Powerful; Karmin Murcelo as Paco's Mother

Episode chronology
← Previous "The Foot"	Next → "An Open Book"

"Familia" is the fourth episode of the first season of the American drama television series Six Feet Under. The episode was written by producer Laurence Andries, and directed by Lisa Cholodenko. It originally aired on HBO on June 24, 2001.

The series, set in Los Angeles, depicts the lives of the Fisher family, who operate a funeral home, along with their friends and lovers. It explores the conflicts that arise following the death of the family's patriarch, Nathaniel, in a car accident. In this episode, David faces challenges regarding his relationship with Keith, while the family is preoccupied with the investigation into the fire.

According to Nielsen Media Research, the episode was seen by an estimated 5.68 million household viewers and gained Nielsen household rating of 3.5, making it the most watched episode of the series by then. The episode received generally positive reviews from critics, who praised the humor and performances, particularly Michael C. Hall.

== Plot ==
At night, a gang member, Manuel "Paco" Bolin (Jacob Vargas) has a conversation with his girlfriend before leaving their car to make a phone call. As his contact only sends him to voice mail, he finds three gang members approaching him with a gun. The contact answers the phone, but the thugs hang up the phone and execute Paco. They flee the scene while his girlfriend watches in horror.

Nate (Peter Krause) and Brenda (Rachel Griffiths) are questioned over the fire at Kroehner's property, but they claim they have no involvement. Nevertheless, Nate and David (Michael C. Hall) suspect Claire (Lauren Ambrose) was involved. They also receive Paco's family for funeral arrangements, which they are unable to pay. However, Paco's gang friend Powerful (Lombardo Boyar) offers to help them, so David gets Federico (Freddy Rodriguez) to help Powerful and Paco's family to agree to the same terms. Nate brings Brenda to his house to meet his family, but they seize the opportunity so Nate can perform oral sex on Brenda. However, Ruth (Frances Conroy) walks in and is shocked by the scene.

David and Keith (Mathew St. Patrick) go shopping, where an angry driver mocks their homosexuality, prompting Keith to threaten the man with his badge and gun. David is not content with Keith's behavior, causing friction in their relationship. As David expresses confusion over Keith's actions, he has imaginary conversations with Paco's corpse, who wants him to stop feeling like an outsider and embrace who he is. This inspires David to inform Gilardi that Fisher & Sons is not for sale, ending their offer. Nate and David also convince Ruth in loaning them $93,000 to make renovations at business, promising her a role as a financial advisor.

The funeral proceeds under the supervision of Paco's parents and Powerful. The service inspires David to apologize to Keith for not standing up for themselves, which he later displays when they go bowling. Nate later arrives at Brenda's house, where she has prepared a romantic evening. As they start kissing, Nate begins to notice Brenda's items and previous conversations, and wonders if she was involved in the fire. At home, Ruth asks Claire if she set up the fire, which she denies. Her statement is enough for Ruth.

== Production ==
=== Development ===
The episode was written by producer Laurence Andries, and directed by Lisa Cholodenko. This was Andries' first writing credit, and Cholodenko's first directing credit.

== Reception ==
=== Viewers ===
In its original American broadcast, "Familia" was seen by an estimated 5.68 million household viewers with a household rating of 3.5. This means that it was seen by 3.5% of the nation's estimated households, and was watched by 3.62 million households. This was a 36% increase in viewership from the previous episode, which was watched by 4.16 million household viewers with a household rating of 2.8.

=== Critical reviews ===
"Familia" received generally positive reviews from critics. John Teti of The A.V. Club wrote, "It's the calm rationality of David's tirade that gets Gilardi. David's not throwing things. He’s not screaming. He's conducting business. “I'm not saying anyone’s going to die. There are tragedies far worse than death. Are we really worth the trouble, Mr. Gilardi?” Problem solved? Not quite. This isn't a fairy tale. But David Fisher is nobody's bitch."

Entertainment Weekly gave the episode a "B–" grade, and wrote, "The episode makes an effective point about prejudice (David doesn't realize that Rico is Puerto Rican, not Mexican) before turning maudlin with a simplistic, let's-all-join-hands resolution." Mark Zimmer of Digitally Obsessed gave the episode a 4.5 out of 5 rating, writing "Highly entertaining and a winner of an episode that touches on serious issues without being dreary."

TV Tome gave the episode a 7 out of 10 rating and wrote "Not neccessarily great, but far from lacklustre and much better than your average "off" episode in any other series." Billie Doux of Doux Reviews gave the episode 2 out of 4 stars and wrote "That final scene with the prayer circle, and the way the gang and the family included the Fishers, was just lovely. And it confirmed that Nate was right. The personal touch is their way to combat Kroehner." Television Without Pity gave the episode a "B" grade.

In 2016, Ross Bonaime of Paste ranked it 29th out of all 63 Six Feet Under episodes and wrote, "In “Familia,” it's decided that Fisher & Sons won't sell their business to a bigger company — they’re going to continue to give their customers a “personal touch.” The episode itself also works to give many of its characters a deeper personal touch, as details emerge that will have long-lasting importance throughout the run of the series. We see there's a very real fear David has about concealing his sexuality, Brenda's continually trying to find her place amongst the Fisher family and Federico attempts to become a part of the business in a way that will have serious impact. After the trifecta of episodes that began the series, “Familia” takes its time to build these characters it has presented, and does so with a foresight that sets these arcs up for years to come."
