= You Never Know (Six Feet Under) =

- Six Feet Under episode
- Episode no.: Season 3 Episode 2
- Directed by: Michael Cuesta
- Written by: Scott Buck
- Cinematography by: Alan Caso
- Editing by: Ron Rosen
- Original release date: March 9, 2003
- Running time: 50 minutes

Guest appearances
- Catherine O'Hara as Carol Ward (special guest star); Lili Taylor as Lisa Kimmel; Patricia Clarkson as Sarah O'Connor; Ben Foster as Russell Corwin; Kathy Bates as Bettina; Justina Machado as Vanessa Diaz; Arye Gross as Frank Muehler; J.P. Pitoc as Phil; Matt Ross as Daniel Showalter; Jim Ortlieb as Andrew Wayne Milne; Julie Ariola as Dorothy Milne

Episode chronology
← Previous "Perfect Circles"	Next → "The Eye Inside"

"You Never Know" is the second episode of the third season of the American drama television series Six Feet Under. It is the 28th overall episode of the series and was written by supervising producer Scott Buck, and directed by Michael Cuesta. It originally aired on HBO on March 9, 2003.

The series is set in Los Angeles, and depicts the lives of the Fisher family, who run a funeral home, along with their friends and lovers. It explores the conflicts that arise after the family's patriarch, Nathaniel, dies in a car accident. In the episode, David and Keith realize there are more problems in their relationship, while Nate and Lisa try to make their life as perfect as possible. Meanwhile, Ruth tries to help Sarah with detox.

According to Nielsen Media Research, the episode was seen by an estimated 5.13 million household viewers and gained a Nielsen household rating of 3.2. The episode received positive reviews from critics, who praised the performances, themes and dark humor.

== Plot ==
At his house, Joe Marti is called by a telemarketer, unsuccessfully trying to get him to buy products from his company, Ameritech Vinyl Windows. Suddenly, Marti hears gunshots in the phone. The scene cuts to AVW's call center, where a gunman is shooting at the employees. The gunman, Daniel Showalter (Matt Ross), kills two employees, Matthew Hazen and Martin Jacobs, before storming into his former manager's office. The manager, Andrew Milne (Jim Ortlieb), pleads for his life, but Daniel kills him and subsequently commits suicide.

The victims' families visit Fisher & Diaz to arrange their funerals. Showalter's family also asks for a funeral, despite knowing Daniel was responsible. Federico (Freddy Rodriguez) refuses, but David (Michael C. Hall) accepts to let them have a funeral, claiming they have never refused service to anyone. Federico is also forced to conduct the embalment for Showalter, where he imagines Showalter and the victims arguing, with the former reiterating that he reached his breaking point for their mistreatment. While Federico is tempted to not conduct the embalment, he ends up finishing it without altering it.

Nate (Peter Krause) is annoyed that Carol (Catherine O'Hara) continues interferring in his life with Lisa (Lili Taylor). They later host dinner to invite David and Keith (Mathew St. Patrick). Keith accidentally flushes the toilet despite being warned not to do it, waking up Maya and forcing Nate and Lisa to console her. Keith is not convinced by their relationship, wherein they claim they never fight. He also gets into an argument with David when he hesitates over the idea of having children, as they previously agreed to do it. During a private therapy session, Keith confides that he feels he married his own mother, and fears he could end up like his father.

Claire (Lauren Ambrose) continues dating Phil (J.P. Pitoc), even though he hints at not seeing her exclusively. During this, Claire also gets close to Russell (Ben Foster), one of her classmates. Ruth (Frances Conroy) is called by Sarah (Patricia Clarkson), who asks her to get Vicodin for her. When she arrives, she finds that Sarah is taken care of by a woman named Bettina (Kathy Bates). Bettina reveals that Sarah is struggling with Vicodin addiction, and she is trying to help detox her. Ruth agrees to stay and help, but Sarah becomes aggressive and makes ridiculous demands. Ruth and Bettina decide to simply tie her to bed and leave to enjoy the day, hearing her screams from the outside.

== Production ==
=== Development ===
The episode was written by supervising producer Scott Buck, and directed by Michael Cuesta. This was Buck's second writing credit, and Cuesta's third directing credit.

== Reception ==
=== Viewers ===
In its original American broadcast, "You Never Know" was seen by an estimated 5.13 million household viewers with a household rating of 3.2. This means that it was seen by 3.2% of the nation's estimated households, and was watched by 3.45 million households. This was a slight increase in viewership from the previous episode, which was watched by 5.09 million household viewers with a household rating of 3.5.

=== Critical reviews ===
"You Never Know" received positive reviews from critics. John Teti of The A.V. Club wrote, "Where “Perfect Circles” was occupied in part with each character's notion of perfection, “You Never Know” takes the other side of the same coin and examines how the Fishers et al. struggle with imperfection."

TV Tome gave the episode an 8 out of 10 rating and wrote "I liked this one. Not as good as the premier, but works nonetheless." Billie Doux of Doux Reviews gave the episode a 3 out of 4 stars and wrote "The standard good SFU episode." Television Without Pity gave the episode a "B+" grade.

In 2016, Ross Bonaime of Paste ranked it 46th out of all 63 Six Feet Under episodes and wrote, "Once this great show ended, there should have absolutely been a spinoff about Ruth, her sister Sarah and Bettina. In an episode that starts with an office shooting and shows Rico arguing about whether or not the shooter deserves the same treatment as his victims, the three ladies trying to get Sarah off drugs is, surprisingly, the lighthearted storyline. “You Never Know” also focuses on three relationships that are on the decline: one where the two are aware of how fragile it is (Keith & David, always), one that's doomed before it even starts (Claire and her morgue employee boyfriend) and one that's still ignorant of how problematic it might all be (Nate and Lisa)."
