= An Open Book (Six Feet Under) =

- Six Feet Under episode
- Episode no.: Season 1 Episode 5
- Directed by: Kathy Bates
- Written by: Alan Ball
- Cinematography by: Alan Caso
- Editing by: Christopher Nelson
- Original release date: July 1, 2001
- Running time: 55 minutes

Guest appearances
- Joanna Cassidy as Margaret Chenowith; Robert Foxworth as Dr. Bernard Chenowith; Veronica Hart as Viveca St. John; Sandra Oh as Porn Starlet; Tim Maculan as Father Jack; Cristine Rose as Hannah; Jordan Ladd as Ginnie

Episode chronology
← Previous "Familia"	Next → "The Room"

"An Open Book" is the fifth episode of the first season of the American drama television series Six Feet Under. The episode was written by series creator Alan Ball, and directed by Kathy Bates. It originally aired on HBO on July 1, 2001.

The series is set in Los Angeles, and depicts the lives of the Fisher family, who run a funeral home, along with their friends and lovers. It explores the conflicts that arise after the family's patriarch, Nathaniel, dies in a car accident. In the episode, David gets a church offer, while Nate meets Brenda's parents. Meanwhile, Ruth takes Claire on a road trip to bond with her.

According to Nielsen Media Research, the episode was seen by an estimated 4.64 million household viewers and gained Nielsen household rating of 3.2. The episode received critical acclaim, who praised the performances, Bates' directing and character development.

== Plot ==
Porn star Viveca St. John (Veronica Hart) takes a bubble bath at her house. As she details her situation to her cat, the cat accidentally knocks her haircurlers in the bathtub, electrocuting and killing her.

While accompanying Ruth (Frances Conroy) to church, David (Michael C. Hall) is offered the position of deacon, which his father had before his death. While Keith (Mathew St. Patrick) is not delighted as they will have less time together, David believes this can help Fisher & Sons. Brenda (Rachel Griffiths) gets Nate (Peter Krause) to hang out with her at her parents' house while they are away for the weekend. However, they arrive early and Nate is introduced to her parents, Bernard (Robert Foxworth) and Margaret (Joanna Cassidy). Nate is quickly introduced to their psychiatry background, and discovers that Brenda has kept some unnerving details about her, such as her parents writing a book inspired by her. He also meets her brother Billy (Jeremy Sisto), who is unstable and has bipolar disorder.

Ruth and Claire (Lauren Ambrose) visit the school counselor, where Claire feels that her family is not happy. To cheer her up, Ruth decides to hang out more often with her, but they find they lack the same interests. Ruth decides to let Claire skip school so they can travel to San Bernardino and visit Claire's cousin Hannah (Cristine Rose) and her daughter Ginnie (Jordan Ladd). However, Claire is annoyed by their "perfect" relationship, with Ginnie not feeling shame for showing love to her mother. Ruth does not mind, but grows impatient when she finds that their lifestyle is not feasible for them, and she decides to leave with Claire.

While arranging Viveca's funeral, David discovers from Nate and Federico (Freddy Rodriguez) about her porn background. Her funeral is attended by many of her co-workers, who share her on-set experiences with her. Ruth is dismayed upon learning her profession. David comes out to Nate, but when he refuses to let Keith come to church with him, Keith accuses him of being a coward and breaks up with him and David later denies his sexuality to his brother. The episode ends as David starts his new position as deacon, with his family in attendance.

== Production ==
=== Development ===
The episode was written by series creator Alan Ball, and directed by Kathy Bates. This was Ball's second writing credit, and Bates' first directing credit.

== Reception ==
=== Viewers ===
In its original American broadcast, "An Open Book" was seen by an estimated 4.64 million household viewers with a household rating of 3.2. This means that it was seen by 3.2% of the nation's estimated households, and was watched by 3.25 million households. This was a 19% decrease in viewership from the previous episode, which was watched by 5.68 million household viewers with a household rating of 3.5.

=== Critical reviews ===
"An Open Book" received critical acclaim. John Teti of The A.V. Club wrote, "It's not a reversion to an earlier time; it's a reversal. Now, Claire is the one taking Ruth out. So Claire matches Ruth's move, and they take an awkward step forward."

Entertainment Weekly gave the episode an "A" grade, and wrote, "Bates brings a deliciously warped sense of humor and visual style to Ball's titillating script; bonus points for wittily incorporating clips from Oz (which Bates has also directed) and Gilmore Girls." Mark Zimmer of Digitally Obsessed gave the episode a 4.5 out of 5 rating, writing "The cruelty is palpable and hilarious as we watch Margaret dissect Nate verbally. The stiff-of-the-week is a porn star, electrocuted in the tub, and David deals with religious issues and revelations."

TV Tome gave the episode a 9 out of 10 rating and wrote "This episode is far the most revealing of the bunch. It's hard to character comes up trumps. You think it's David for many of the positive reasons i mentioned earlier on in this review but then there's Ruth and Claire who manage to avoid the cheesy melodrama that other series fall prey to, but then there's Brenda - whose revelations regarding still has me in shock." Billie Doux of Doux Reviews gave the episode perfect 4 out of 4 stars and wrote "Ruth and Claire are definitely more in the normal range: antagonistic, but they actually do love each other and sometimes find ways to relate. Unlike Brenda and Margaret Chenowith, who told Nate that Brenda was a master manipulator and liked to take center stage. What an incredibly cruel thing to tell your daughter's boyfriend. Even if it was true." Television Without Pity gave the episode an "A–" grade.

In 2016, Ross Bonaime of Paste ranked it 22nd out of all 63 Six Feet Under episodes and wrote, "“An Open Book” shows Ball having fun with the notion of expectations. For example, David comes out to Nate — a moment that is awkward, yet goes better than either of them could have imagined. By the end however, David has taken it back, hiding himself, even though he's clearly been accepted. Meanwhile in a brilliant parody that takes on the relationship between Rory and Lorelei on Gilmore Girls, Ruth desperately attempts that type of bond between her and Claire. When the two share an evening with a mother and daughter eerily similar to what Ruth thinks she wants, she turns on it, deciding instead to create a relationship with Claire that might not be idyllic, but plays on the strengths of their originality and humor. Of course, this all comes in the episode where Nate meets Brenda's psychiatrist parents, bipolar brother Billy and learns of the siblings' troubled childhood. Ball writes them into this great episode as a family that can always be relied upon to never be what you expect."
