= The Room (Six Feet Under) =

- Six Feet Under episode
- Episode no.: Season 1 Episode 6
- Directed by: Rodrigo García
- Written by: Christian Taylor
- Cinematography by: Alan Caso
- Editing by: Michael Ruscio
- Original release date: July 8, 2001
- Running time: 58 minutes

Guest appearances
- Bill Cobbs as Mr. Jones; Ed Begley Jr. as Hiram Gunderson; Richard Jenkins as Nathaniel Fisher Sr.; Ed O'Ross as Nikolai; Tim Maculan as Father Jack

Episode chronology
← Previous "An Open Book"	Next → "Brotherhood"

"The Room" is the sixth episode of the first season of the American drama television series Six Feet Under. The episode was written by producer Christian Taylor, and directed by Rodrigo García. It originally aired on HBO on July 8, 2001.

The series is set in Los Angeles, and depicts the lives of the Fisher family, who run a funeral home, along with their friends and lovers. It explores the conflicts that arise after the family's patriarch, Nathaniel, dies in a car accident. In the episode, Nate discovers that his father had a secret room unbeknownst to the family, while David reluctantly goes on a date.

According to Nielsen Media Research, the episode was seen by an estimated 5.29 million household viewers and gained a Nielsen household rating of 3.7. The episode received critical acclaim, who praised the performances, writing, and themes.

== Plot ==
At his house, Mr. Jones (Bill Cobbs) wakes up. He tries to awake his wife, Mildred “Hattie” Jones, but realizes that she has died in her sleep.

Mr. Jones visits Fisher & Sons to arrange the funeral, and his attitude annoys David (Michael C. Hall) and Nate (Peter Krause). He also refuses to pay for the quota, which David reminds it is the bare minimum for the funeral. While checking the finances, Nate discovers some errors in his father's ledger. Investigating further, he finds that Nathaniel (Richard Jenkins) traded funeral services for favors, such as getting marijuana from a local businesswoman and renting a room above an Indian restaurant, leading Nate to ponder just how well he really knew his father. When he brings Brenda (Rachel Griffiths) and David to check it, they both tell him that there is nothing wrong with not knowing what his father was doing.

When Ruth (Frances Conroy) ignores him, Hiram (Ed Begley Jr.) asks David for help, but he refuses. Ruth experiences nostalgia when flowers remind her of her young children, and when she finds naked pictures of herself taken by Nathaniel. Later, David reluctantly goes on a date with Tracy, a woman who has a crush on him, but whose personality annoys him. The date ends badly when David finally concludes he feels lonely without Keith. He goes to a gay bar, where he pretends to care for a man. The man takes David to his house, and gives him oral sex.

Claire (Lauren Ambrose) meets Billy (Jeremy Sisto), immediately taking an interest in him, and he gets her introduced to photography. Brenda opposes to this, as she worries that this could end up badly for Claire. Claire later calls him up, but it becomes clear that Billy is not interested in anything serious. Brenda consoles Claire, smoking marijuana with her. That night, Ruth finally visits Hiram at his house, reconciling.

== Production ==
=== Development ===
The episode was written by producer Christian Taylor, and directed by Rodrigo García. This was Taylor's first writing credit, and García's first directing credit.

== Reception ==
=== Viewers ===
In its original American broadcast, "The Room" was seen by an estimated 5.29 million household viewers with a household rating of 3.7. This means that it was seen by 3.7% of the nation's estimated households, and was watched by 3.77 million households. This was a 14% increase in viewership from the previous episode, which was watched by 4.64 million household viewers with a household rating of 3.2.

=== Critical reviews ===
"The Room" received critical acclaim. John Teti of The A.V. Club wrote, "“It's frightening how much we change,” Ruth says, but she sounds less frightened than she was before. The photos remind her that change has happened before, so it's not a betrayal if it happens again. In a roundabout way, then, the room bestows one more moment of freedom as Ruth walks up to Hiram's front door and, for now at least, agrees to stop punishing herself."

Entertainment Weekly gave the episode an "A–" grade, and wrote, "García proves an inspired choice to direct this haunting episode, with its surreal scenes of Nate getting high with his dead father and flashbacks to Brenda's bizarro childhood." Mark Zimmer of Digitally Obsessed gave the episode a 4 out of 5 rating, writing "The episode features a neat little homage to the notorious dream sequence in the third episode of Twin Peaks. The episode gives some nice depth to characters."

TV Tome gave the episode an 8 out of 10 rating and wrote "If last week's revelations about David and Brenda were mind blowing, then it's nice to see the writers keep up the intrigue here. Sure, the surprises here may not be a complete shocker (such as Dead Dad's occasional use of illegal substances), but they nonetheless keep you entertained." Billie Doux of Doux Reviews gave the episode perfect 4 out of 4 stars and wrote "This episode made me all philosophical; I think it had even more layers of meaning than usual." Television Without Pity gave the episode an "A–" grade.

In 2016, Ross Bonaime of Paste ranked it 8th out of all 63 Six Feet Under episodes and wrote, "In the early 2000s, television was rarely as ambiguous as it can be today, but “The Room” remains one of the best examples of ambiguous storytelling done right. Nate finds out that his father often traded goods and services in exchange for funeral costs, leading him to discover a room his father was given in a restaurant. Nate has no idea what happened in this room and will never find out. Even though his psyche might present his father to him once in a while, he will never know his father, and now that he's gone, the mystery will nag at him throughout the series. But instead of trying desperately to find the answers, Nate understands that he can also enjoy the mystery of his departed father. In “The Room” we also come to see Ruth's sadness in more powerful ways, as she begins to realize just how lonely she is. David tries to find comfort in another man, and Claire heads down a path that leads right to crazy Billy. But it's Billy who brings the world of photography into Claire's life, which will be of great importance to her and her future."
