= The Eye Inside =

- Six Feet Under episode
- Episode no.: Season 3 Episode 3
- Directed by: Michael Engler
- Written by: Kate Robin
- Cinematography by: Alan Caso
- Editing by: Tanya Swerling
- Original release date: March 16, 2003
- Running time: 51 minutes

Guest appearances
- Catherine O'Hara as Carol Ward (special guest star); Lili Taylor as Lisa Kimmel; Ben Foster as Russell Corwin; Kathy Bates as Bettina; J.P. Pitoc as Phil; Peter Macdissi as Olivier Castro-Staal; Sarah Rafferty as Rachel Mortimer; Megan Austin Oberle as Callie Mortimer

Episode chronology
← Previous "You Never Know"	Next → "Nobody Sleeps"

"The Eye Inside" is the third episode of the third season of the American drama television series Six Feet Under. It is the 29th overall episode of the series and was written by producer Kate Robin, and directed by Michael Engler. It originally aired on HBO on March 16, 2003.

The series is set in Los Angeles, and depicts the lives of the Fisher family, who run a funeral home, along with their friends and lovers. It explores the conflicts that arise after the family's patriarch, Nathaniel, dies in a car accident. In the episode, Nate and Lisa find a new problem with Carol, while David and Keith go on vacations. Meanwhile, Claire meets a new teacher, while Ruth continues her friendship with Bettina.

According to Nielsen Media Research, the episode was seen by an estimated 4.41 million household viewers and gained a Nielsen household rating of 2.8. The episode received positive reviews from critics, who praised the performances and themes.

== Plot ==
Walking on the street, Callie Mortimer is harassed by three men, causing her to accelerate her walk. Stopping in the middle of the road, she recognizes the men as classmates and scolds them. She fails to see a car approaching and hitting her, dying.

Ruth (Frances Conroy) continues her friendship with Bettina (Kathy Bates), accompanying her in hiking. While shopping, Bettina shows Ruth that she often shoplifts and gives her instructions on how to avoid detection, concerning her. Claire (Lauren Ambrose) continues her relationship with both Phil (J.P. Pitoc) and Russell (Ben Foster), but grows confused over her role. During a class, they are introduced to Olivier Castro-Staal (Peter Macdissi), a renowned teacher that many admire. Despite this, he imposes a free-spirited routine in order to find the artists inside themselves. While many consider his methods pretentious, Claire is delighted when he praises one of her works. This experience also changes Claire's view on her relationship, and she decides to break up with Phil.

Despite Nate (Peter Krause) maintaining that his marriage is working, he begins to feel alone, to the point that he has to masturbate in his own car. Lisa (Lili Taylor) grows more annoyed with Carol (Catherine O'Hara), as her demands become more common. When she arrives late due to taking care of Maya, Lisa and Carol get into an argument. Carol states that she hates that Lisa suddenly found herself busy with Nate and Maya, prompting Lisa to quit. Without a job, they are forced to move to the Fisher residence. Federico (Freddy Rodriguez) advises Nate on how difficult marriage can be on the first year, but Nate states their marriage is working.

David (Michael C. Hall) and Keith (Mathew St. Patrick) go on vacations to a resort. David is worried that the guests will feel intimidated by their presence, and is also cautious of not having any other gay couple. Keith is more relaxed, and convinces David in just enjoying their stay. They end up having sex, enjoying the vacations. On their way home, they find that they are stuck in traffic. While they still have things to fix in their relationship, they sing along to an audio tape of David's chorus.

== Production ==
=== Development ===
The episode was written by producer Kate Robin, and directed by Michael Engler. This was Robin's fourth writing credit, and Engler's fourth directing credit.

== Reception ==
=== Viewers ===
In its original American broadcast, "The Eye Inside" was seen by an estimated 4.41 million household viewers with a household rating of 2.8. This means that it was seen by 2.8% of the nation's estimated households, and was watched by 2.96 million households. This was a 15% decrease in viewership from the previous episode, which was watched by 5.13 million household viewers with a household rating of 3.2.

=== Critical reviews ===
"The Eye Inside" received positive reviews from critics. John Teti of The A.V. Club wrote, "The previous episode, “You Never Know,” posited that you can't ever entirely know another person, and “The Eye Inside” gives us one reason why. We temper ourselves in the presence of others. We suppress parts of our personality, perhaps because we're scared of showing them, or for the sake of harmony. There are plenty of reasons, and the Fishers are extraordinarily familiar with all of them. That self-temperance can be exhausting, though. In “The Eye Inside,” we see that all of the Fishers are realizing just how tiresome it can be."

TV Tome gave the episode a 7 out of 10 rating and wrote "It had to happen and sure enough it has as we finally see Nate being ambivalant about his marriage. If the last two episodes were simply a smokescreen, then here some of that smoke gets lifted, as we begin to see the cracks in Nate and Lisa's marriage." Billie Doux of Doux Reviews gave the episode a 2 out of 4 stars and wrote "David and Keith loudly and boisterously singing together in bed was so much fun. That was my favorite scene." Television Without Pity gave the episode a "C+" grade.

In 2016, Ross Bonaime of Paste ranked it 44th out of all 63 Six Feet Under episodes and wrote, "“The Eye Inside” finds Ruth and Claire among friends and teachers who help them become more clear about who they truly are. Bettina engages Ruth in some light shoplifting, while showing her that fun and frivolity can be more important than usefulness. Claire meets her most important teacher Olivier, who praises her for creating art that makes him want to throw up—but in a good way. But what makes this episode interesting is that it simultaneously shows how certain relationships might not be as strong as they seemed. Keith and David have a great vacation, spoiled by something as simple as traffic, whereas Nate’s balance between work and home is thrown off by a move back to the Fisher family home."
