= Perfect Circles =

- Six Feet Under episode
- Episode no.: Season 3 Episode 1
- Directed by: Rodrigo García
- Written by: Alan Ball
- Cinematography by: Alan Caso; Frederick Iannone
- Editing by: Michael Ruscio
- Original release date: March 2, 2003
- Running time: 48 minutes

Guest appearances
- Catherine O'Hara as Carol Ward (special guest star); Lili Taylor as Lisa Kimmel; Richard Jenkins as Nathaniel Fisher; Arye Gross as Frank Muehler; J.P. Pitoc as Phil; Geoffrey Nauffts as Dr. DiPaolo; Myndy Crist as Dana; Robert Cicchini as Todd; Kimberlin Brown as Soap Actress; Nolan North as Soap Actor

Episode chronology
← Previous "The Last Time"	Next → "You Never Know"

"Perfect Circles" is the first episode of the third season of the American drama television series Six Feet Under. It is the 27th overall episode of the series and was written by series creator Alan Ball, and directed by Rodrigo García. It originally aired on HBO on March 2, 2003.

The series is set in Los Angeles, and depicts the lives of the Fisher family, who run a funeral home, along with their friends and lovers. It explores the conflicts that arise after the family's patriarch, Nathaniel, dies in a car accident. In the episode, Nate experiences alternate realities during his coma, as he is instructed to choose between life and death.

According to Nielsen Media Research, the episode was seen by an estimated 5.09 million household viewers and gained a Nielsen household rating of 3.5. The episode received positive reviews from critics, who praised the performances (particularly Krause), themes and character development, although some were divided over the first half of the episode.

== Plot ==
Nate (Peter Krause) lies unconscious on the surgery room while the doctors operate him. The doctors comment that the operation has been very complicated, with some problems along the way. The screen fades to white and displays the words "Nathaniel Samuel Fisher, Jr. 1965-2002".

Nate finds himself experiencing strange events. He starts seeing different versions of himself, including one where he plays with Lisa (Lili Taylor) and Maya, and another where he learns to speak. He also attends his own funeral, and is confused when he jumps around different realities. He confronts Nathaniel (Richard Jenkins), who explains that he is neither dead or alive. He asks him to see his own coffin, which showcases a glowing light when Nate stares at it. The screen fades to white, displaying the same text from the opening sequence, but removing "2002".

Seven months later, Nate has recovered from a rupture during surgery, is married with Lisa and they live together with Maya. Lisa now works for neurotic film producer Carol Ward (Catherine O'Hara), whom Nate dislikes. Carol and Nate get into an argument when the latter parks in his driveway, and she ends up crying in the kitchen. Claire (Lauren Ambrose) is now in LAC Arts, where she is specifically asked to draw "perfect circles" for her class. She takes an interest in a crematorium worker, Phil (J.P. Pitoc), who is part of a band. After visiting for a performance, they end up having sex.

David (Michael C. Hall) and Keith (Mathew St. Patrick) are still together, but attend therapy to put aside their differences. Keith has lost his job as police officer and now works in security, which he hates. David, meanwhile, has decided to audition for the Gay Men's Chorus. Federico (Freddy Rodriguez) is enjoying his new stake in the newly rebranded Fisher & Diaz, but struggles to understand many of the concepts that come with his position. Nate returns home and talks with Lisa over their life. Nate notes that this conversation is similar to the one he experienced in his coma, leaving him curious over his future with Lisa and Maya.

== Production ==
=== Development ===
The episode was written by series creator Alan Ball, and directed by Rodrigo García. This was Ball's sixth writing credit, and García's fourth directing credit.

== Reception ==
=== Viewers ===
In its original American broadcast, "Perfect Circles" was seen by an estimated 5.09 million household viewers with a household rating of 3.5. This means that it was seen by 3.5% of the nation's estimated households, and was watched by 3.72 million households. This was a 8% decrease in viewership from the previous episode, which was watched by 5.49 million household viewers with a household rating of 3.4.

=== Critical reviews ===
"Perfect Circles" received positive reviews from critics. John Teti of The A.V. Club wrote, "It's his most intense déjà vu experience in an episode full of them, and it appears to solidify Nate's conviction that there was a meaning to those operating-table visions. He made a choice in that moment. He jerked himself awake. In the season to come, we'll see when he chooses to pursue perfection and when he seeks the beauty in imperfection. In this closing scene, he's sure of one thing: He’ll square life's circle yet."

TV Tome gave the episode a 9 out of 10 rating and wrote "Despite the utter confusion, this was a bloody brilliant way to open Season Three, even if the show steeps into fantasy territory more than Ball and co may be willing to admit (although they do acknowledge that unlike their Emmy rivals, they have a "cult" appeal) and this foreshadows the inevitable darker than usual tone this season is set to take." Billie Doux of Doux Reviews gave the episode a 2 out of 4 stars and wrote "I hate watching something and not knowing what actually happened." Television Without Pity gave the episode a "B+" grade.

In 2016, Ross Bonaime of Paste ranked it 5th out of all 63 Six Feet Under episodes and wrote, "Six Feet Under's biggest opening fake out, “Perfect Circles” begins with the death of Nate Fisher, before taking it back. What we see during Nate's surgery is his envisioning of the multiple roads that his life could've gone down. There's one where he's dead, one where he and Brenda stay together, and even one where he's just a redneck. The “Perfect Circles”’ opener is a shock, but by giving us these possibilities and also the reality of Nate surviving, we get to have our cake and eat it too. Taking place a year after the Season Two finale, the episode skips over a lot of dead weight — like the transition of Fisher & Sons into Fisher & Diaz, as well as Claire's transition into college and Nate and Lisa's marriage. Instead, we jump right back into this story, and there's even a clear effort to heighten the visual experience of the series. “Perfect Circles” truly feels like a rebirth for Six Feet Under, altogether."
