= Kate Robin =

American playwright and television writer

- Occupations: Playwright; Television writer television producer
- Known for: One Mississippi

Kate Robin is an American playwright, television writer and producer, and screenwriter.

== Career ==
Robin's recent theater productions include: I See You (the Flea), What They Have (South Coast Rep), Anon. (The Atlantic Theater Company), Intrigue with Faye (MCC Theater), The Light Outside (The Flea Theater), and Swimming in March (Market Theatre), which won the IRNE Award for Best Play of 2001. In 2003, Robin received the Princess Grace Award for playwriting and is an alumna for New Dramatists.

Robin joined the writing staff of Six Feet Under as the show's first female writer in 2001. In 2002, Robin was appointed executive story editor and in 2003 became a producer. For the fifth and final season Robin was credited as a supervising producer. Robin has written 8 episodes for the series which include the season 2 finale, “The Last Time”, and the season 5 premiere, “A Coat of White Primer”.

In Spring 2010, Robin worked as a consulting producer for the first season on NBC comedy-drama series Parenthood.

Robin served as co-executive producer of The Affair, a drama series which premiered on Showtime in October 2014. Robin has written three episodes.

She was the showrunner of One Mississippi created by and starring Tig Notaro on Amazon Prime Video.

She wrote one episode of Dead to Me on Netflix. She currently serves as an executive producer and showrunner of the upcoming Netflix limited series Vladimir, created by Julia May Jonas based on her novel of the same name.

== Screenwriting credits ==
- Coming Soon (1999)
- Mädchen, Mädchen (2001)

== Television writing credits ==
=== Six Feet Under ===
- “A Private Life” (2001)
- “The Plan” (2002)
- “The Last Time” (2002)
- “The Eye Inside” (2003)
- “The Opening” (2003)
- “Terror Starts at Home” (2004)
- “A Coat of White Primer” (2005)
- “All Alone” (2005)

=== The Affair ===
- “105” (2014)
- “107” (2014)
- “109” (2014)

=== One Mississippi ===
- “Effects” (2016)
- “Kiss Me and Smile for Me” (2017)
- “I'm Alive” (2017)

=== Dead to Me ===
- “I Can't Go Back” (2019)
