= Ed O'Ross =

American actor

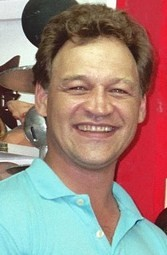
- O'Ross in 2007
- Born: Edward Orss; July 5, 1949 (age 76); Pittsburgh, Pennsylvania, US
- Occupation: Actor
- Years active: 1979–present
- Spouse: Veronica Talbot (m. 2000)
- Children: 2

Ed O'Ross (born Edward Orss; July 5, 1949) is an American actor. His prominent roles include Itchy in Dick Tracy, Max Kale in Walker, Texas Ranger, Colonel Perry in Universal Soldier, Lt. Touchdown in Full Metal Jacket, ruthless Georgian mobster Viktor Rustaveli in Red Heat, and police detective Cliff Willis in The Hidden. He also appeared on Six Feet Under (2001–2005), and Shark (2006–2008).

== Early life and education ==
O'Ross was born Edward Orss on July 5, 1949 in Pittsburgh, Pennsylvania. He is of Czechoslovak descent.

O'Ross graduated from Munhall High School, where he was a star baseball player, in 1964. He subsequently attended Point Park College and Carnegie Tech (which became Carnegie Mellon University).

Prior to becoming an actor, O'Ross was a boxer, winning a Golden Gloves amateur championship in 1964. He was also a minor league baseball player. He auditioned for two Major League Baseball teams (the Pittsburgh Pirates and St. Louis Cardinals), but was not selected.

He studied acting over several years, under Stella Adler and Uta Hagen, among others.

== Career ==
O'Ross has appeared in many films and series, including Red Heat, Six Feet Under, and Curb Your Enthusiasm. He voiced Agent K in the first season of Men in Black: The Series and was replaced by Gregg Berger in subsequent seasons. He also provided voiceover work and appeared in the music video alongside Bob Hoskins for the 1985 Paul Hardcastle song “Just For Money”.

Other films of his include Dreams of Gold: The Mel Fisher Story, The Pope of Greenwich Village, The Cotton Club, Full Metal Jacket, Lethal Weapon, The Hidden, Action Jackson, Another 48 Hrs., Universal Soldier, Dick Tracy, Hoodlum, Curious George, A Green Story, The Harsh Life of Veronica Lambert, and Sorority Party Massacre.

Guest television appearances include Stingray, Boston Legal, Seinfeld, Walker, Texas Ranger, CSI: NY, The Outsiders, and Moonlighting (in the episode "Brother, Can You Spare A Blonde?").

== Personal life ==
O'Ross resides in New York City and Los Angeles.

== Filmography ==
=== Film ===
Year	Title	Role	Notes
1984	The Pope of Greenwich Village	Bartender	
1984	The Cotton Club	Monk	
1987	Lethal Weapon	Mendez	
1987	Full Metal Jacket	Lt. Touchdown	
1987	The Hidden	Cliff Willis	
1988	Action Jackson	Frank Stringer	
1988	Red Heat	Viktor Rostavili	
1990	Dick Tracy	Itchy	
1990	Another 48 Hrs.	Frank Cruise	
1992	Universal Soldier	Colonel Perry	
1997	Hoodlum	Lulu Rosenkrantz	
2006	Curious George	Ivan (voice)	
2010	Curious George 2: Follow That Monkey!	Ivan (voice)	
2012	A Green Story	Van	
2012	Sorority Party Massacre	Barney Lumpkin	
2019	Curious George: Royal Monkey	Ivan (voice)	

=== Television ===
Year	Title	Role	Notes
1986	Dreams of Gold: The Mel Fisher Story	Trooper Hudley	Television film
1995	Seinfeld: The Engagement	Detective Blake	Minor Role
1997–1998	Men in Black: The Series	Agent K (voice)	Main role (season 1)
2001–2005	Six Feet Under	Nikolai	17 episodes
2004–2005	Justice League Unlimited	Tobias Manning, General Olanic (voice)	2 episodes
2005	Curb Your Enthusiasm	Leo	Episode: "The Larry David Sandwich"
2005	Teen Titans	Raskov (voice)	Episode: "Snowblind"

=== Video games ===
Year	Title	Role	Notes
2009	Terminator Salvation	Warren	
