= Mathew St. Patrick =

American actor (born 1968)

- Born: Mathew St. Patrick; March 17, 1968 (age 58); Philadelphia, Pennsylvania, U.S.
- Occupation: Actor
- Years active: 1996–present

Mathew St. Patrick (born March 17, 1968) is an American actor best known for his portrayal of Keith Charles on the HBO drama series Six Feet Under (2001−05). Previously, Patrick appeared as Marcus Taggert in General Hospital (1997) and Adrian Sword in All My Children (1998−2000), both soap operas. St. Patrick also had a leading role as Detective Kenneth Marjorino in the series Reunion (2005−06). His film roles include War (2007) and Alien Raiders (2008).

== Early life ==
St. Patrick was born and raised in Philadelphia, Pennsylvania, the son of Curtis St. Patrick, a hot dog vendor, and Brenda (née Queen), who taught grade school. He was on the varsity track team of Olney High School, but graduated in 1986 from Scotland School for Veterans' Children in Scotland, Pennsylvania, the last remaining school for children of military veterans in the United States.

After graduating from high school, St. Patrick lived in New York and then for eight years in the Chicago, Illinois area (Carol Stream, Illinois) where he worked various jobs: delivery salesman for Coca-Cola in St. Charles, Illinois, at UPS, a furniture store delivery driver (Zierks Furnishings) in St. Charles, Illinois, driving an 18-wheeled flatbed truck for Quikrete of Chicago, and for the Union Pacific Railroad loading and unloading new cars and trucks at West Chicago Yard.

== Acting career ==
In 1994, St. Patrick moved to Los Angeles, California to begin his acting career. In Los Angeles, he first worked as a personal trainer then in 1996 joined the West Coast Theater Ensemble. After acting in his first stage production, Full Court Press, an agent noticed him and cast St. Patrick in the latter's film debut, Steel Sharks (1997), playing a Navy serviceman.

St. Patrick was cast as Detective Marcus Taggert on the soap opera General Hospital in 1997, replacing Réal Andrews in the role. However, his time in the role was brief, and Andrews returned as Marcus in 1998. St. Patrick was not satisfied with Marcus' character, describing him as "one-dimensional." He joined another soap opera, All My Children, as police lieutenant Adrian Sword, appearing in the series until 2000. For his performance as Adrian, St. Patrick received two NAACP Image Award nominations for Outstanding Actor in a Daytime Drama Series, in 1999 and 2000.

He made guest appearances on Beverly Hills, 90210, Diagnosis: Murder, NYPD Blue, and Crossing Jordan. St. Patrick landed the role of Keith Charles in the HBO series Six Feet Under in 2001, portraying a cop in a relationship with David Fisher (Michael C. Hall). Alongside his Six Feet Under cast members, St. Patrick was nominated five consecutive times for the Screen Actors Guild Award for Outstanding Performance by an Ensemble in a Drama Series (2001−05), winning the award in 2002 and 2003. St. Patrick continued playing Keith until the series ended in 2005.

St. Patrick starred as Detective Marjorino in the Fox drama series Reunion, which ran from 2005 to 2006. Additionally, he played an FBI agent in the film War (2007) and Seth in the science fiction horror film Alien Raiders (2008). St. Patrick voiced an EMT in the "Mr. Mathers" skit featured on Eminem's album Relapse (2009). He was the first voice of Skulker on Danny Phantom (2004), but was later replaced in the role by Kevin Michael Richardson. St. Patrick did voice work in the preschool series Higglytown Heroes (2005−06).

Following the end of Six Feet Under, most of St. Patrick's roles on television have been minor characters. He appeared in the pilot of the TV series NCIS: Los Angeles (2013) and guest starred on Law & Order: Special Victims Unit (2006), Private Practice (2009) and Hawaii Five-0 (2017). St. Patrick had a recurring role during the final season of the FX drama series Sons of Anarchy (2014), as Moses Cartwright.

== Personal life ==
St. Patrick has a son and reads the Bible regularly.

== Filmography ==
Year	Title	Role	Notes
1996	NYPD Blue	Rickie	Episode: "Unembraceable You"
1996	Moesha	Trainer	Episode: "The List"
1997	Beverly Hills, 90210	Basketball Official	Episode: "Straight Shooter"
1997	Steel Sharks	Mattox	
1997	Diagnosis Murder	Howie Lanier	Episode: "Slam Dunk Dead"
1998	NYPD Blue	Marvin	Episode: "You're Under a Rasta"
1998	Surface to Air	Quinland	
1998	Mike Hammer, Private Eye	Marcus Aurelis Sterling	2 episodes
1998–2000	All My Children	Adrian Sword	63 episodes Nominated—Image Award for Outstanding Actor in a Daytime Drama Series (2000–01)
2001–2005	Six Feet Under	Keith Charles	63 episodes Screen Actors Guild Award for Outstanding Performance by an Ensemble in a Drama Series (2003–04); Nominated—Screen Actors Guild Award for Outstanding Performance by an Ensemble in a Drama Series (2002, 2005–06)
2004	Danny Phantom	Skulker	Voice role, 3 episodes; after St. Patrick's departure from the series, Skulker was voiced by Kevin Michael Richardson for the remainder of the series.
2004	Crossing Jordan	William Avery	Episode: "Justice Delayed"
2005–2006	Higglytown Heroes	Policeman Hero	2 episodes
2005–2006	Reunion	Detective Kenneth Marjorino	13 episodes
2006	Law & Order: Special Victims Unit	Roddy Franklin	Episode: "Class"
2007	War	Wick	
2008	Sleepwalking	Detective #1	
2008	Ball Don't Lie	Louis Accord	
2008	Alien Raiders	Seth Steadman	
2009	Private Practice	Malcolm	Episode: "What You Do for Love"
2009	NCIS: Los Angeles	Bobby J. Jenlow	Episode: "Identity"
2009–2010	Saving Grace	Tom Harris	2 episodes
2013	NCIS	Metro Detective Bill Shard	Episode: "Prime Suspect"
2014	Sons of Anarchy	Moses Cartwright	3 episodes
2015	Eddie and the Aviator	The Aviator	
2017	Hawaii Five-0	John Berris	Episode: "Ka Laina Ma Ke One"
2017	Extinction	Agent Davidson	
2018	Doe	Carl	
2019	Ice Cream in the Cupboard	Dr. Derek Crowder	
