= List of awards and nominations received by Six Feet Under =

List of awards won by Six Feet Under
Awards & Nominations
Award	Won	Nominated
AFI Awards	0	2
ALMA Awards	0	4
American Cinema Editors	0	1
Art Directors Guild	1	0
Australian Film Institute Awards	1	0
BMI Film Music Award	5	0
Banff Television Festival	1	0
British Comedy Awards	1	0
Casting Society of America	4	0
Cinema Audio Society Awards	1	2
Costume Designers Guild Awards	1	4
Directors Guild of America Award	1	5
Emmy Awards	9	44
GLAAD Media Awards	3	2
Golden Globe Award	3	8
Grammy Awards	0	3
Hollywood Makeup Artist and Hair Stylist Guild Awards	2	8
Image Awards	0	1
Imagen Foundation Awards	3	3
International Horror Guild Award	1	1
Motion Picture Sound Editors	2	4
PGA Awards	1	4
Peabody Awards	1	0
Prism Awards	1	0
Royal Television Society	1	1
Satellite Awards	0	4
Screen Actors Guild Awards	3	6
SHINE Awards	0	2
Stony Awards	0	1
TV Land Award	0	3
Teen Choice Awards	0	1
Television Critics Association Award	1	4
Writers Guild of America Award	0	4
Young Artist Awards	0	1
- Total number of wins and nominations
Totals	46	168
- Footnotes

Six Feet Under is an American comedy-drama series that aired on premium cable network HBO from June 3, 2001, to August 21, 2005. It has been nominated for many different awards, including 44 Emmy Awards (with 9 wins), 8 Golden Globe Award nominations (including 3 wins), 3 Grammy Awards, 4 Writers Guild of America Awards, 4 Television Critics Association Awards, 4 Screen Actors Guild Awards (including 3 wins), 4 Satellite Awards, 4 PGA Awards, 5 GLAAD Media Awards (with 3 wins), 5 Directors Guild of America Awards and 4 ALMA Award nominations.

For the Golden Globe Awards, the series won for Best Drama Series in 2001, while receiving nominations in 2002 and 2003. Peter Krause was nominated for Best Actor in a Drama Series in 2001 and 2002. Rachel Griffiths won for Best Supporting Actress in a Series, Miniseries, or TV Film in 2001, and received a nomination in 2002 in the Lead Actress category. Frances Conroy won for Best Actress in a Drama Series in 2003. For the Screen Actors Guild Awards, the cast won for Outstanding Ensemble in a Drama Series in 2002 and 2003, while received nominations in 2001, 2004, and 2005. Peter Krause was nominated for Outstanding Male Actor in a Drama Series in 2001 and 2003. Frances Conroy won for Outstanding Female Actor in a Drama Series in 2003.

The series received 11 major Emmy nominations for its first two seasons and received 9 major nominations for the 2003 Primetime Emmy Awards for its third season, including a nomination for Outstanding Drama Series. The series received 2 major nominations at the 2005 Primetime Emmy Awards for its fourth season, for Outstanding Drama Series and Outstanding Lead Actress in a Drama Series for Frances Conroy. The series received 6 major nominations at the 2006 Primetime Emmy Awards for its fifth and final season, including a nomination for Outstanding Drama Series. Alan Ball was nominated for writing and directing for the series finale episode "Everyone's Waiting". The show, during its run, was nominated for 168 awards including 46 wins.

== Emmy Awards ==
At the 2002 Primetime Emmy Awards, the series received 11 major nominations for its two first seasons, including a nomination for Outstanding Drama Series. Series creator Alan Ball won for Outstanding Directing for a Drama Series for the pilot episode and Patricia Clarkson won for Outstanding Guest Actress in a Drama Series. The rest of the ensemble cast, including Michael C. Hall, Peter Krause, Frances Conroy, Rachel Griffiths, Freddy Rodriguez, and Lauren Ambrose all received acting nominations. While guest actors Lili Taylor and Illeana Douglas received nominations in the guest acting category.

The series received 9 major nominations at the 2003 Primetime Emmy Awards for its third season, including a nomination for Outstanding Drama Series. Peter Krause, Frances Conroy, Lauren Ambrose, Rachel Griffiths, James Cromwell, and Kathy Bates all received acting nominations. Alan Poul was nominated for directing for the episode "Nobody Sleeps", while Craig Wright was nominated for writing for the episode "Twilight". The series received 2 major nominations at the 2005 Primetime Emmy Awards for its fourth season, for Outstanding Drama Series and Outstanding Lead Actress in a Drama Series for Frances Conroy. The series received 6 major nominations at the 2006 Primetime Emmy Awards for its fifth and final season, including a nomination for Outstanding Drama Series. Patricia Clarkson won for the second time for Outstanding Guest Actress in a Drama Series. While Peter Krause, Frances Conroy, and Joanna Cassidy received acting nominations. Alan Ball was nominated for writing and directing for the series finale episode "Everyone's Waiting".

=== Primetime Emmy Awards ===
Year	Category	Nominee(s)	Episode(s)	Result
2002	Outstanding Drama Series	Nominees Alan Ball; Bob Greenblatt; David Janollari; Alan Poul; Bruce Eric Kaplan; Christian Williams; Rick Cleveland; Laurence Andries; Scott Buck; Christian Taylor; Joey Soloway		Nominated
2002	Outstanding Directing for a Drama Series	Alan Ball	"Pilot"	Won
2002	Outstanding Lead Actress in a Drama Series	Frances Conroy	"Pilot"	Nominated
2002	Outstanding Lead Actress in a Drama Series	Rachel Griffiths	"The Secret"	Nominated
2002	Outstanding Lead Actor in a Drama Series	Michael C. Hall	"A Private Life"	Nominated
2002	Outstanding Lead Actor in a Drama Series	Peter Krause	"In the Game"	Nominated
2002	Outstanding Supporting Actor in a Drama Series	Freddy Rodríguez	"The Trip" + "I'll Take You"	Nominated
2002	Outstanding Supporting Actress in a Drama Series	Lauren Ambrose	"The Trip" + "The Plan"	Nominated
2002	Outstanding Guest Actress in a Drama Series	Illeana Douglas	"The New Person"	Nominated
2002	Outstanding Guest Actress in a Drama Series	Patricia Clarkson	"Back to the Garden"	Won
2002	Outstanding Guest Actress in a Drama Series	Lili Taylor	"Someone Else's Eyes"	Nominated
2003	Outstanding Drama Series	Nominees Alan Ball; Bob Greenblatt; David Janollari; Alan Poul; Bruce Eric Kaplan; Rick Cleveland; Scott Buck; Joey Soloway; Kate Robin; Robert Del Valle; Lori Jo Nemhauser		Nominated
2003	Outstanding Directing for a Drama Series	Alan Poul	"Nobody Sleeps"	Nominated
2003	Outstanding Writing for a Drama Series	Craig Wright	"Twilight"	Nominated
2003	Outstanding Lead Actress in a Drama Series	Frances Conroy	"Nobody Sleeps"	Nominated
2003	Outstanding Lead Actor in a Drama Series	Peter Krause	"Death Works Overtime"	Nominated
2003	Outstanding Supporting Actress in a Drama Series	Lauren Ambrose	"Nobody Sleeps" + "Twilight"	Nominated
2003	Outstanding Supporting Actress in a Drama Series	Rachel Griffiths	"Timing & Space" + "The Opening"	Nominated
2003	Outstanding Guest Actor in a Drama Series	James Cromwell		Nominated
2003	Outstanding Guest Actress in a Drama Series	Kathy Bates		Nominated
2005	Outstanding Drama Series	Nominees Alan Ball; Bob Greenblatt; David Janollari; Alan Poul; Bruce Eric Kaplan; Rick Cleveland; Scott Buck; Joey Soloway; Kate Robin; Robert Del Valle; Lori Jo Nemhauser		Nominated
2005	Outstanding Lead Actress in a Drama Series	Frances Conroy	"Coming and Going"	Nominated
2006	Outstanding Directing for a Drama Series	Alan Ball	"Everyone's Waiting"	Nominated
2006	Outstanding Writing for a Drama Series	Alan Ball	"Everyone's Waiting"	Nominated
2006	Outstanding Lead Actress in a Drama Series	Frances Conroy	"Everyone's Waiting"	Nominated
2006	Outstanding Lead Actor in a Drama Series	Peter Krause	"Time Flies"	Nominated
2006	Outstanding Guest Actress in a Drama Series	Patricia Clarkson		Won
2006	Outstanding Guest Actress in a Drama Series	Joanna Cassidy		Nominated

=== Creative Arts Emmy Awards ===
Season	Category	Nominee(s)	Episode	Result
2002	Outstanding Casting for a Drama Series	Nominees Junie Lowry-Johnson; Libby Goldstein; Julie Tucker		Won
2002	Outstanding Single Camera Picture Editing for a Series	Christopher Nelson (editor)	"Pilot"	Nominated
2002	Outstanding Cinematography for a Single-Camera Series	Alan Caso	"Driving Mr. Mossback"	Nominated
2002	Outstanding Main Title Theme Music	Thomas Newman		Won
2002	Outstanding Main Title Design	Nominees Marcia Hinds; Thomas T. Taylor; Susan Mina Eschelbach		Won
2002	Outstanding Single Camera Sound Mixing for a Series	Nominees Richard Van Dyke; Peter Reale; Roberta Doheny	"Pilot"	Nominated
2002	Outstanding Art Direction for a Single Camera Series	Nominees Marcia Hinds; Thomas T. Taylor; Susan Mina Eschelbach	"Pilot"	Nominated
2002	Outstanding Art Direction for a Single Camera Series	Nominees Daniel Ross; Suzuki Ingerslev; Rusty Lipscomb	"Back To The Garden"	Nominated
2002	Outstanding Costumes for a Series	Nominees Gail McMullen; Carlos Brown; Lucinda Campbell	"Back To The Garden"	Nominated
2002	Outstanding Makeup for a Series (Prosthetic)	Nominees Dan Rebert; Thomas Floutz; Lee Romaire; Todd Masters; Scott Tebeau; Donna-Lou Henderson; Justin B. Henderson; Kylie Bell	"A Private Life"	Won
2002	Outstanding Makeup for a Series (Non-Prosthetic)	Nominees Donna-Lou Henderson; Justin B. Henderson; June Bracken		Nominated
2002	Outstanding Hairstyling for a Series	Nominees Randy Sayer; Kimberley Spiteri; Pinky Babajian	"I'll Take You"	Nominated
2003	Outstanding Casting for a Drama Series	Junie Lowry-Johnson; Libby Goldstein		Won
2003	Outstanding Cinematography for a Single-Camera Series	Alan Caso	"Nobody Sleeps"	Nominated
2003	Outstanding Art Direction for a Single Camera Series	Nominees Suzuki Ingerslev; Phil Dagort; Rusty Lipscomb	"The Opening"	Nominated
2003	Outstanding Costumes for a Series	Nominees Jill M. Ohanneson; Danielle Launzel; Bridget Ostersehlte	"Tears, Bones And Desire"	Nominated
2003	Outstanding Makeup for a Series (Prosthetic)	Nominees Todd Masters; Mark Garbarino; Scott Wheeler; Dan Rebert; Erik Schaper	"Perfect Circles"	Nominated
2003	Outstanding Makeup for a Series (Non-Prosthetic)	Nominees Donna-Lou Henderson; Justin B. Henderson; Megan Moore	"Perfect Circles"	Nominated
2003	Outstanding Hairstyling for a Series	Nominees Randy Sayer; Dennis Parker; Pinky Babajian	"Perfect Circles"	Nominated
2005	Outstanding Cinematography for a Single-Camera Series	Lowell Peterson	"Untitled"	Nominated
2005	Outstanding Art Direction for a Single-Camera Series	Nominees Suzuki Ingerslev; Kristan Andrews; Rusty Lipscomb	"Grinding the Corn", "Bomb Shelter", "Untitled"	Nominated
2005	Outstanding Costumes for a Series	Jill M. Ohanneson; Bridget Ostersehlte	"Grinding the Corn"	Nominated
2006	Outstanding Art Direction for a Single-Camera Series	Nominees Suzuki Ingerslev; Kristan Andrews; Rusty Lipscomb	"Holding My Hand", "Singing For Our Lives", "Everyone's Waiting"	Nominated
2006	Outstanding Costumes for a Series	Joanna Cassidy	"Everyone's Waiting"	Nominated
2006	Outstanding Prosthetic Makeup for a Series, Miniseries, Movie or a Special	Nominees Matthew W. Mungle; Michelle Vittone; John E. Jackson; Clinton Wayne	"Everyone's Waiting"	Won
2006	Outstanding Hairstyling for a Series	Nominees Randy Sayer; Miia Kovero; Karl Wesson; Daphne Lawson	"Everyone's Waiting"	Nominated

== GLAAD Media Awards ==
Year	Category	Result
2002	Outstanding Drama Series	Won
2003	Outstanding Drama Series	Won
2004	Outstanding Drama Series	Nominated
2005	Outstanding Drama Series	Won
2006	Outstanding Drama Series	Nominated

== Golden Globes ==
Year	Category	Nominee(s)	Result
2002	Best Performance by an Actor in a Television Series - Drama	Peter Krause	Nominated
2002	Best Television Series - Drama	—	Won
2002	Best Performance by an Actress in a Supporting Role in a Series, Mini-Series or Motion Picture Made for Television	Rachel Griffiths	Won
2003	Best Television Series - Drama	—	Nominated
2003	Best Performance by an Actress in a Television Series - Drama	Rachel Griffiths	Nominated
2003	Best Performance by an Actor in a Television Series - Drama	Peter Krause	Nominated
2004	Best Television Series - Drama	—	Nominated
2004	Best Performance by an Actress in a Television Series - Drama	Frances Conroy	Won

== Grammy Awards ==
Year	Category	Work	Nominee(s)	Result
2003	Best Compilation Soundtrack Album for a Motion Picture, Television or Other Visual Media	—	—	Nominated
2006	Best Compilation Soundtrack Album for Motion Picture, Television or Other Visual Media	Volume 2 - Everything Ends	Nominees Gary Calamar (producer); Thomas Golubic (producer); Errol Kolosine (producer)	Nominated
2006	Best Song Written for Motion Picture, Television or Other Visual Media	For "Cold Wind" for Volume 2 - Everything Ends	Arcade Fire	Nominated

== Screen Actors Guild Awards ==
Year	Category	Nominee(s)	Result
2002	Outstanding Performance by a Male Actor in a Drama Series	Peter Krause	Nominated
2002	Outstanding Performance by an Ensemble in a Drama Series	Nominees Lauren Ambrose; Frances Conroy; Rachel Griffiths; Michael C. Hall; Richard Jenkins; Peter Krause; Freddy Rodríguez; Jeremy Sisto; Mathew St. Patrick	Nominated
2003	Outstanding Performance by an Ensemble in a Drama Series	Nominees Lauren Ambrose; Frances Conroy; Rachel Griffiths; Michael C. Hall; Peter Krause; Freddy Rodríguez; Mathew St. Patrick	Won
2004	Outstanding Performance by a Female Actor in a Drama Series	Frances Conroy	Won
2004	Outstanding Performance by an Ensemble in a Drama Series	Nominees Lauren Ambrose; Frances Conroy; Ben Foster; Rachel Griffiths; Michael C. Hall; Peter Krause; Peter Macdissi; Justina Machado; Freddy Rodríguez; Mathew St. Patrick; Lili Taylor; Rainn Wilson	Won
2004	Outstanding Performance by a Male Actor in a Drama Series	Peter Krause	Nominated
2005	Outstanding Performance by an Ensemble in a Drama Series	Nominees Lauren Ambrose; Frances Conroy; James Cromwell; Idalis DeLeon; Peter Facinelli; Ben Foster; Sprague Grayden; Rachel Griffiths; Michael C. Hall; Peter Krause; Justina Machado; Freddy Rodríguez; Mathew St. Patrick; Mena Suvari; Justin Theroux	Nominated
2006	Outstanding Performance by an Ensemble in a Drama Series	Nominees Lauren Ambrose; Joanna Cassidy; Frances Conroy; James Cromwell; Rachel Griffiths; Michael C. Hall; Tina Holmes; Peter Krause; Justina Machado; Freddy Rodríguez; Jeremy Sisto; Mathew St. Patrick	Nominated

== Writers Guild of America Awards ==
The Writers Guild of America Awards are presented annually by the Writers Guild of America. Six Feet Under has been nominated for 4 Writers Guild of America Awards but has won none.

Year	Category	Work	Nominee(s)	Result
2003	Episodic Drama	"In Place Of Anger"	Christian Taylor	Nominated
2005	Episodic Drama	"Falling Into Place"	Craig Wright	Nominated
2006	Episodic Drama	"Singing for Our Lives"	Scott Buck	Nominated
2006	Dramatic Series	—	Nominees Alan Ball; Scott Buck; Rick Cleveland; Bruce Eric Kaplan; Nancy Oliver; Kate Robin; Joey Soloway; Craig Wright	Nominated

== Other awards ==
Award	Year	Category	Nominee(s)	Result
AFI Awards	2002	AFI Actor of the Year- Male- Series	Michael C. Hall	Nominated
AFI Awards	2002	AFI Drama Series of the Year	—	Nominated
ALMA Awards	2002	Outstanding Actor in a Television Series	Freddy Rodríguez	Nominated
ALMA Awards	2002	Outstanding Television Series	—	Nominated
ALMA Awards	2006	Outstanding Supporting Actor in a Television Series	Freddy Rodríguez	Nominated
ALMA Awards	2006	Outstanding Supporting Actress in a Television Series	Justina Machado	Nominated
American Cinema Editors Awards	2006	Best Edited One-Hour Series for Non-Commercial Television for "Everyone's Waiting"	Michael Ruscio	Nominated
Art Directors Guild	2002	Best Television - Episode of a Single-Camera Series for "Pilot"	Marcia Hinds (production designer); Thomas T. Taylor (art director)	Won
Australian Film Institute	2006	Best Actress in a Leading Role	Rachel Griffiths	Won
BMI Film & TV Award	2002	BMI Cable Award	Thomas Newman	Won
BMI Film & TV Award	2002	BMI Cable Award	Richard Marvin	Won
BMI Film & TV Award	2003	BMI Cable Award	Thomas Newman	Won
BMI Film & TV Award	2003	BMI Cable Award	Richard Marvin	Won
BMI Film & TV Award	2004	BMI Cable Award	Thomas Newman	Nominated
BMI Film & TV Award	2005	BMI Cable Award	Thomas Newman	Won
BMI Film & TV Award	2005	BMI Cable Award	Richard Marvin	Nominated
Banff Television Festival	2002	Best Continuing Series for "Pilot"	—	Won
British Comedy Awards	2003	Best International Comedy Show	—	Won
Casting Society of America	2002	Artios for Best Casting for TV, Dramatic Episodic	Junie Lowry-Johnson; Julie Tucker	Won
Casting Society of America	2002	Artios for Best Casting for TV, Dramatic Pilot	Junie Lowry-Johnson; Julie Tucker	Won
Casting Society of America	2003	Artios for Best Casting for TV, Dramatic Episodic	Junie Lowry-Johnson	Won
Casting Society of America	2005	Artios for Best Dramatic Episodic Casting	Junie Lowry-Johnson	Nominated
Cinema Audio Society Awards	2002	Outstanding Sound Mixing for Television- Series for "The Last Time"	Nominees Peter Reale; Roberta Doheny; Richard Van Dyke	Won
Cinema Audio Society Awards	2003	Outstanding Sound Mixing for Television- Series for "I'm Sorry, I'm Lost"	Nominees Peter Reale; Roberta Doheny; Steven Morrow	Nominated
Cinema Audio Society Awards	2004	Outstanding Achievement in Sound Mixing for Television - Series	Nominees Elmo Ponsdomenech (re-recording mixer); Joe Earle (re-recording mixer); Bo Harwood (production mixer)	Nominated
Costume Designers Guild Awards	2002	Excellence in Costume Design for Television - Contemporary	Mark Bridges ("Pilot"); Gail McMullen (Series)	Nominated
Costume Designers Guild Awards	2003	Excellence in Costume Design for Television - Contemporary	Gail McMullen	Nominated
Costume Designers Guild Awards	2004	Excellence in Costume Design for Television - Contemporary	Jill M. Ohanneson	Nominated
Costume Designers Guild Awards	2005	Excellence in Costume Design for Television - Contemporary	Jill M. Ohanneson	Nominated
Costume Designers Guild Awards	2006	Outstanding Costume Design for Television Series - Contemporary	Jill M. Ohanneson	Won
Directors Guild of America Award	2002	Outstanding Directorial Achievement in Dramatic Series' - Night for "Pilot"	Nominees Alan Ball; Robert Del Valle; Alan Brent Connell; Jack Steinberg; Ruby Stillwater	Won
Directors Guild of America Award	2003	Outstanding Directorial Achievement in Dramatic Series' - Night for "Back To the Garden"	Daniel Attias	Nominated
Directors Guild of America Award	2004	Outstanding Directorial Achievement in Dramatic Series' - Night for "I'm Sorry I'm Lost"	Alan Ball	Nominated
Directors Guild of America Award	2004	Outstanding Directorial Achievement in Dramatic Series' - Night for "Twilight"	Kathy Bates	Nominated
Directors Guild of America Award	2004	Outstanding Directorial Achievement in Dramatic Series' - Night for "Nobody Sleeps"	Alan Poul	Nominated
Directors Guild of America Award	2006	Outstanding Directorial Achievement in Dramatic Series' - Night for "Everyone's Waiting"	Alan Ball	Nominated
Hollywood Makeup Artist and Hair Stylist Guild Awards	2002	Best Contemporary Makeup - Television (For a Single Episode of a Regular Series - Sitcom, Drama or Daytime) for "An Open Book"	Nominees Donna-Lou Henderson; Justin B. Henderson; Michelle Vittone; Pamela Santori	Won
Hollywood Makeup Artist and Hair Stylist Guild Awards	2002	Best Period Makeup - Television (For a Single Episode of a Regular Series - Sitcom, Drama or Daytime) for "Pilot"	Nominees Donna-Lou Henderson; Justin B. Henderson; June Bracken; Todd Masters	Won
Hollywood Makeup Artist and Hair Stylist Guild Awards	2002	Best Character Makeup - Television (For a Single Episode of a Regular Series - Sitcom, Drama or Daytime) for "Familia"	Nominees Donna-Lou Henderson; Justin B. Henderson; Todd Masters	Nominated
Hollywood Makeup Artist and Hair Stylist Guild Awards	2003	Best Contemporary Hair Styling - Television Series	Nominees Randy Sayer; Kimberley Spiteri; Pinky Babajian	Nominated
Hollywood Makeup Artist and Hair Stylist Guild Awards	2003	Best Contemporary Makeup - Television Series	Nominees Donna-Lou Henderson; Justin B. Henderson; Michelle Vittone	Nominated
Hollywood Makeup Artist and Hair Stylist Guild Awards	2003	Best Period Makeup - Television Series	Nominees Donna-Lou Henderson; Justin B. Henderson; Michelle Vittone	Nominated
Hollywood Makeup Artist and Hair Stylist Guild Awards	2004	Best Character Makeup - Television Series	Nominees Donna-Lou Henderson; Justin B. Henderson; Megan Moore	Nominated
Hollywood Makeup Artist and Hair Stylist Guild Awards	2004	Best Contemporary Hair Styling - Television Series	Nominees Randy Sayer; Dennis Parker; Pinky Babajian	Nominated
Hollywood Makeup Artist and Hair Stylist Guild Awards	2004	Best Contemporary Makeup - Television Series	Nominees Donna-Lou Henderson; Justin B. Henderson; Megan Moore	Nominated
Hollywood Makeup Artist and Hair Stylist Guild Awards	2004	Best Period Makeup - Television Series	Nominees Donna-Lou Henderson; Justin B. Henderson; Michelle Vittone	Nominated
Image Awards	2003	Outstanding Drama Series	—	Nominated
Imagen Foundation Awards	2003	Best Supporting Actor - Television	Freddy Rodríguez	Won
Imagen Foundation Awards	2004	Best Supporting Actor in a Television Drama	Freddy Rodríguez	Won
Imagen Foundation Awards	2005	Best Supporting Actor - Television	Freddy Rodríguez	Won
Imagen Foundation Awards	2005	Best Supporting Actress - Television	Justina Machado	Nominated
Imagen Foundation Awards	2006	Best Supporting Actor	Freddy Rodríguez	Nominated
Imagen Foundation Awards	2006	Best Supporting Actress - Television	Justina Machado	Nominated
International Horror Guild Award	2003	Best Television	—	Won
International Horror Guild Award	2004	Best Television	—	Nominated
Motion Picture Sound Editors	2002	Best Sound Editing in Television - Dialogue & ADR, Episodic	Nominees Bob Newlan (supervising sound editor); Jason Lezama (sound editor); David Beadle (sound editor); Helen Luttrell (sound editor); Sonya Henry (sound editor)	Won
Motion Picture Sound Editors	2003	Best Sound Editing in Television Episodic - Music for "Back To the Garden"	Bruno Roussel	Nominated
Motion Picture Sound Editors	2004	Best Sound Editing in Television Episodic - Dialogue & ADR	Nominees Bob Newlan (supervising sound editor); Helen Luttrell (dialogue/adr editor); Patrick Hogan (dialogue/adr editor); Sonya Henry (dialogue/adr editor); Jane Boegel (dialogue/adr editor); Jason Lezama (dialogue/adr editor)	Won
Motion Picture Sound Editors	2005	Best Sound Editing in Television Episodic - Music for "Parallel Play"	Bruno Roussel	Nominated
Motion Picture Sound Editors	2005	Best Sound Editing in Television Short Form - Dialogue & ADR for "Falling into Place"	Nominees Bob Newlan (supervising sound editor/supervising dialogue editor/supervising adr editor); Jane Boegel (dialogue/adr editor); Mark Kamps (dialogue/adr editor)	Nominated
Motion Picture Sound Editors	2006	Best Sound Editing in Television Short Form - Music	Bruno Roussel	Nominated
PGA Awards	2002	Television Producer of the Year Award in Episodic	—	Nominated
PGA Awards	2003	Television Producer of the Year Award in Episodic	Nominees Alan Ball; Alan Poul; Bob Greenblatt; David Janollari	Nominated
PGA Awards	2004	Television Producer of the Year Award in Episodic	Nominees Alan Ball; Alan Poul; Bob Greenblatt; David Janollari	Won
PGA Awards	2005	Television Producer of the Year Award in Episodic	—	Nominated
PGA Awards	2006	Television Producer of the Year Award in Episodic	Nominees Alan Ball; Alan Poul; Bruce Eric Kaplan; Robert Del Valle; Lori Jo Nemhauser; Rick Cleveland	Nominated
Peabody Awards	2003	Peabody Award	—	Won
Prism Awards	2004	Best Performance in a Drama Series (Multi-Episode Series)	Peter Krause	Won
Royal Television Society	2003	Best Acquired Programme	—	Won
Royal Television Society	2004	International Award	—	Nominated
Satellite Awards	2002	Best Television Series, Drama	—	Nominated
Satellite Awards	2003	Best Performance by an Actor in a Series, Drama	Peter Krause	Nominated
Satellite Awards	2004	Best Television Series, Drama	—	Nominated
Satellite Awards	2006	Best DVD Release of a TV Show	—	Nominated
SHINE Award	2002	Scene Stealer	—	Nominated
SHINE Award	2003	Series Storyline	—	Nominated
Stony Award	2005	Best HBO Show	—	Nominated
TV Land Awards	2005	Favorite Two-Parter/Cliffhanger For "the death of Lisa Kimmel Fisher"	—	Nominated
TV Land Awards	2007	Series Finale You Had a Party to Watch	—	Nominated
TV Land Awards	2008	Siblings That Make You Grateful for Your Own Crazy Family	Nominees Peter Krause; Michael C. Hall; Lauren Ambrose	Nominated
Teen Choice Awards	2002	TV - Choice Actress, Drama	Lauren Ambrose	Nominated
Television Critics Association Awards	2002	Program of the Year	—	Nominated
Television Critics Association Awards	2002	New Program of the Year	—	Nominated
Television Critics Association Awards	2002	Individual Achievement in Drama	Rachel Griffiths	Nominated
Television Critics Association Awards	2002	Outstanding Achievement in Drama	—	Won
Television Critics Association Awards	2003	Outstanding Achievement in Drama	—	Nominated
Young Artist Awards	2002	Best Performance in a TV Series (Comedy or Drama) - Young Actor Age Ten or Under	Hayden Tank	Nominated
