= The Liar and the Whore =

- Six Feet Under episode
- Episode no.: Season 2 Episode 11
- Directed by: Miguel Arteta
- Written by: Rick Cleveland
- Cinematography by: Alan Caso
- Editing by: Sue Blainey
- Original release date: May 12, 2002
- Running time: 49 minutes

Guest appearances
- Glenn Fitzgerald as Aaron Buchbinder; Molly Parker as Rabbi Ari; Harriet Sansom Harris as Catherine Collins; Ed O'Ross as Nikolai; Justina Machado as Vanessa Diaz; Julie White as Mitzi Dalton Huntley; Joel Brooks as Robbie; Aysia Polk as Taylor; David Norona as Gary Deitman; Marina Black as Parker McKenna; Nicki Micheaux as Karla Charles; James Pickens Jr. as Mr. Charles; Beverly Todd as Mrs. Charles

Episode chronology
← Previous "The Secret"	Next → "I'll Take You"

"The Liar and the Whore" is the eleventh episode of the second season of the American drama television series Six Feet Under. It is the 24th overall episode of the series and was written by supervising producer Rick Cleveland, and directed by Miguel Arteta. It originally aired on HBO on May 12, 2002.

The series is set in Los Angeles, and depicts the lives of the Fisher family, who run a funeral home, along with their friends and lovers. It explores the conflicts that arise after the family's patriarch, Nathaniel, dies in a car accident. In the episode, Nate finally confesses his secret to Brenda, while the Fishers face a lawsuit from a former client.

According to Nielsen Media Research, the episode was seen by an estimated 5.79 million household viewers and gained a Nielsen household rating of 3.6. The episode received positive reviews from critics, who praised the character development.

== Plot ==
In hospice care, Edith Kirky calls out a woman named "Ramona", as she expresses her desire to just die already. Her nurses, one of which is revealed to be Vanessa (Justina Machado), check on her, but they are astonished to learn that she has died.

Nate (Peter Krause) and Brenda (Rachel Griffiths) attend a marriage counseling session by Rabbi Ari (Molly Parker), hoping to put aside their problems. Ari suggests they need to be completely honest with each other, prompting Nate to finally confess that Lisa is pregnant with his child. Brenda is taken aback by the revelation, and storms off. David (Michael C. Hall) and Nate are informed that Catherine Collins (Harriet Sansom Harris), one of their previous clients, is planning to sue them for emotional damage after seeing her husband's body. (Note: As depicted in "In Place of Anger".) To complicate matters, they find that Kroehner is backing her up, with Mitzi (Julie White) once again making an offer to buy Fisher & Sons.

After witnessing Nikolai (Ed O'Ross) threatened by another Russian loan shark, Ruth (Frances Conroy) finally decides to intervene. She visits the loan shark and reluctantly pays Nikolai's $87,000 debt, saving his life. However, Nikolai is upset and insults her. Robbie (Joel Brooks) tells Ruth that she should not have intervened, questioning her role in his life. Claire (Lauren Ambrose) and Parker (Marina Black) decide to use mushrooms that Sarah planted on her bag, leading Claire to hold an honest meeting with Gary (David Norona), finally admitting that she must improve her relationship with her mother.

David and Keith (Mathew St. Patrick) have difficulty taking care of Taylor (Aysia Polk) but refuse to let Keith's dysfunctional parents take custody. Keith's father (James Pickens Jr.) is very strict and does not trust his son or David with Taylor. Keith finally stands up to his father, making it clear Taylor will stay. This motivates David to confront Catherine and angrily point out that she will destroy his family business, causing her to abandon the lawsuit. That night, Brenda invites two strangers into her house and has sex with both, subsequently kicking them out. She later meets with Nate, proclaiming her love for him and forgiving him, but not revealing her actions.

== Production ==
=== Development ===
The episode was written by supervising producer Rick Cleveland, and directed by Miguel Arteta. This was Cleveland's third writing credit, and Arteta's third directing credit.

== Reception ==
=== Viewers ===
In its original American broadcast, "The Liar and the Whore" was seen by an estimated 5.79 million household viewers with a household rating of 3.6. This means that it was seen by 3.6% of the nation's estimated households, and was watched by 3.77 million households. This was a slight increase in viewership from the previous episode, which was watched by 5.66 million household viewers with a household rating of 3.6.

=== Critical reviews ===
"The Liar and the Whore" received positive reviews from critics. John Teti of The A.V. Club wrote, "Brenda represents one possible change. So it's to Nate's great relief that she returns to him, folds herself up in his arms, and tells him that she loves him. “As fucked-up as you are, you're the sanest thing in my life,” she says. She means it more than he knows."

Entertainment Weekly gave the episode a "C+" grade, and wrote, "It's good to see the Nate-and-Brenda plot progress, but the pair of weak subplots (Keith stands up to his dad! Fisher & Sons get sued!) feels imported from run-of-the-mill network dramas." Mark Zimmer of Digitally Obsessed gave the episode a perfect 5 out of 5 rating, writing "Things pick up again in episode 11, with great drama (the legal suit) and humor (Claire's psychedelic mushroom-induced gift). Brenda's visions of herself as a girl at her parents' sex party is quite haunting, and the removal of a certain foreign object from the deceased woman's mouth is gruesome and disturbing."

TV Tome gave the episode a 7 out of 10 rating and wrote "Following last week's excellent instalment, "The Liar And The Whore" is a little bit of a disappointment and feels slightly like a filler, despite some pivotal moments here, which can only mean that the next two episodes will kick ass big time. Still, points for an incredibly disgusting way to kill a character as the elderly person dies from choking on a sausage and I will refrain from the amount of smutty jokes that I am tempted to make as a result." Billie Doux of Doux Reviews gave the episode a 3 out of 4 stars and wrote "This one was about the importance of telling the truth. And the consequences of telling the truth. And about Brenda still not telling the truth." Television Without Pity gave the episode a "B+" grade.

In 2016, Ross Bonaime of Paste ranked it 33rd out of all 63 Six Feet Under episodes and wrote, "In “The Liar and the Whore,” we really get to see how our characters find emotional support in others. Ruth finds comfort in paying for Nikolai's debts and preparing food for the family, Claire needs reassurance of her talents, and the couples (Keith and David, and Rico and Vanessa) find support in each other to make the right decisions. It all works to highlight the fact that, perhaps the reason Brenda can't find what she needs, is because her support is more fleeting, and her distrust of others makes it difficult for her to be comforted. Despite how hard all of these characters might be working to try and prove her wrong, it's very interesting that Karla explains in this episode, “people don't change, they just get older.”"
