= Driving Mr. Mossback =

- Six Feet Under episode
- Episode no.: Season 2 Episode 4
- Directed by: Michael Cuesta
- Written by: Rick Cleveland
- Cinematography by: Alan Caso
- Editing by: Michael Ruscio
- Original release date: March 24, 2002
- Running time: 58 minutes

Guest appearances
- Lili Taylor as Lisa Kimmel; Joanna Cassidy as Margaret Chenowith; Grant Show as Scott Axelrod; David Norona as Gary Deitman; Kellie Waymire as Melissa; Aysia Polk as Taylor; Beverly Todd as Keith's Mother

Episode chronology
← Previous "The Plan"	Next → "The Invisible Woman"

"Driving Mr. Mossback" is the fourth episode of the second season of the American drama television series Six Feet Under. It is the seventeenth overall episode of the series and was written by supervising producer Rick Cleveland, and directed by Michael Cuesta. It originally aired on HBO on March 24, 2002.

The series is set in Los Angeles, and depicts the lives of the Fisher family, who run a funeral home, along with their friends and lovers. It explores the conflicts that arise after the family's patriarch, Nathaniel, dies in a car accident. In the episode, Nate and Claire go to Seattle to retrieve a dead body, while David babysits Keith's niece.

According to Nielsen Media Research, the episode was seen by an estimated 4.43 million household viewers and gained a Nielsen household rating of 2.7. The episode received positive reviews from critics, who praised the performances, writing and character development.

== Plot ==
In Seattle, a tour guide takes a few pedestrians on a bus to explain the history of the city. She drops off them at Pike Place Market, but notices an old man, Harold Mossback, who is not moving. Upon inspection, the guide realizes that Harold has died.

Harold's family visits Fisher & Sons to arrange a proper funeral in Los Angeles. Despite his death, they refuse to let the body be transported by plane, as he was afraid of flying. With other services unavailable, Nate (Peter Krause) offers to fly to Seattle and drive all the way back with Harold's body. He also decides to bring Claire (Lauren Ambrose) to accompany him, paying for her ticket. They stay at the house of Lisa (Lili Taylor), Nate's friend with benefits. While Nate maintains their relationship is not based on love, Lisa confides in Claire her belief that Nate would admit his love for her eventually.

Brenda (Rachel Griffiths) is forced to abandon a session when her mother Margaret (Joanna Cassidy) calls to meet her at a spa. Margaret has found that her husband is inside the spa, and believes he is having an affair. They await in the car, struggling to maintain a peaceful conversation. When the woman leaves the spa, Margaret attacks her. Brenda then confronts Margaret over her reason to accompany her, accusing her of being a narcissist. When Margaret mocks her struggles, Brenda slaps her and leaves the car. Inspired by her time at "The Plan", Ruth (Frances Conroy) decides to contact people like Hiram to reconcile, but she does not get the welcome surprise she hoped.

Keith (Mathew St. Patrick) leaves Taylor (Aysia Polk) with his mother (Beverly Todd), but runs into problems when he cannot pick her up at elementary school. He asks David (Michael C. Hall) to pick her up, and he takes her to his house. Taylor is curious over David's profession, and they have a talk over the concept of death. While driving for food, Nate has an attack related to his AVM, but hides the condition from Claire. He gets medicine, and seeks consolation with Lisa. Later, Nate and Claire leave Seattle with Mossback's body, with Claire remarking that Nate is "just as fucked up as the rest of us."

== Production ==
=== Development ===
The episode was written by supervising producer Rick Cleveland, and directed by Michael Cuesta. This was Cleveland's second writing credit, and Cuesta's first directing credit.

== Reception ==
=== Viewers ===
In its original American broadcast, "Driving Mr. Mossback" was seen by an estimated 4.43 million household viewers with a household rating of 2.7. This means that it was seen by 2.7% of the nation's estimated households, and was watched by 2.89 million households. This was a 23% decrease in viewership from the previous episode, which was watched by 5.68 million household viewers with a household rating of 3.5.

=== Critical reviews ===
"Driving Mr. Mossback" received positive reviews from critics. John Teti of The A.V. Club wrote, "You don't press David like this. He's an undertaker; he knows where the emotional bodies are buried, so to speak. And when he's pushed like he is here, that David Fisher snarl appears, and he unearths the pain, exposing it to the open air. He says: “Mom, I'm happy for you if this Plan thing has helped you draft your own blueprint, patch up some of the cracks in the foundation, but just between you and me, you're starting to sound like a crazy person. I think it's time you kept that shit to yourself and minded your own fucking business.” In other words: You're a fraud, and everybody knows it. Ruth looks completely drained, so much so that even though David was right to be angry, it's hard not to have sympathy for her. Man, there are some killer monologues in this episode."

Entertainment Weekly gave the episode a "B+" grade, and wrote, "A case study in the fine art of scene-stealing, this episode is a showcase for Taylor and Joanna Cassidy, both of whom create enjoyably annoying characters who stop just short of parody." Mark Zimmer of Digitally Obsessed gave the episode a 3 out of 5 rating, writing "It does have its funny moments, mostly in the character of Lisa, and Taylor's interactions with David, but the humor of the previous episodes is attenuated. Director Michael Cuesta livens things up visually, with off-kilter angles and non-obvious framing, and this episode is more visually interesting than the first three."

TV Tome gave the episode a 7 out of 10 rating and wrote "A solid episode from supervising producer Rick Cleveland, though not a superb one. On the plus side there's a cool song playing through the episode's closing credits and the producers have finally decided to add Previously On and, weirdly enough Next On credits to the show. About time." Billie Doux of Doux Reviews gave the episode a 3 out of 4 stars and wrote "The standard good SFU episode." Television Without Pity gave the episode a "B" grade.

In 2016, Ross Bonaime of Paste ranked it 12th out of all 63 Six Feet Under episodes and wrote, "In the first great episode of Season Two, “Driving Mr. Mossback” reminds us of just how excellent Six Feet Under can be, especially in its more shocking moments. Nate returns to his old home of Seattle, bringing Claire along. While there, we meet his old co-op friend/occasional sex buddy Lisa — who will end up playing a huge role in the next few seasons — and we see the effects of AVM on Nate for the first time. Brenda fantasizes about a man she met at a bar, and Nate may or may not have cheated on her with Lisa while in Seattle. In spite of all that we don't see in “Driving Mr. Mossback,” it's clear that the gap between them is growing and that neither of them is getting what they want out of this relationship anymore. At least for the time being."
