= It's the Most Wonderful Time of the Year (Six Feet Under) =

- Six Feet Under episode
- Episode no.: Season 2 Episode 8
- Directed by: Alan Taylor
- Written by: Scott Buck
- Cinematography by: Alan Caso
- Editing by: Sue Blainey
- Original release date: April 21, 2002
- Running time: 54 minutes

Guest appearances
- Jeremy Sisto as Billy Chenowith (special guest star); Joanna Cassidy as Margaret Chenowith; Richard Jenkins as Nathaniel Fisher; Ed O'Ross as Nikolai; Justina Machado as Vanessa Diaz; Aysia Polk as Taylor; Kellie Waymire as Melissa; Rusty Schwimmer as Marilyn Johnson; Stark Sands as Toby; Franc Ross as Jessie Johnson; W. Earl Brown as Pete

Episode chronology
← Previous "Back to the Garden"	Next → "Someone Else's Eyes"

"It's the Most Wonderful Time of the Year" is the eighth episode of the second season of the American drama television series Six Feet Under. It is the 21st overall episode of the series and was written by supervising producer Scott Buck, and directed by Alan Taylor. It originally aired on HBO on April 21, 2002.

The series is set in Los Angeles, and depicts the lives of the Fisher family, who run a funeral home, along with their friends and lovers. It explores the conflicts that arise after the family's patriarch, Nathaniel, dies in a car accident. In the episode, the family is forced to work on Christmas for a funeral, which coincides with Nathaniel's death anniversary.

According to Nielsen Media Research, the episode was seen by an estimated 6.97 million household viewers and gained a Nielsen household rating of 4.3. The episode received critical acclaim, with critics praising the performances, writing, tone, flashbacks and ending.

== Plot ==
Jesse Johnson reluctantly accepts his wife's request to start his seasonal job as Santa Claus at a mall. As he drives off on his motorcycle, he salutes three children who call him from a bench in the park. Distracted, he accidentally crashes with a car, dying.

Johnson's family pays Fisher & Sons to set up his funeral for Christmas Day, paying more than usual as the family does not usually work on that day. The family is not completely delighted with the holiday, as it marks the one-year anniversary of Nathaniel's death. Ruth (Frances Conroy) makes Claire (Lauren Ambrose) accompany her to church, and she in turn decides to hang out with Toby (Stark Sands), whom she now considers her boyfriend. However, Claire's family and personality end up being too much for Toby, and they decide to break up. When Vanessa (Justina Machado) questions Rico (Freddy Rodriguez) for firing Ramon, he finally admits that he caught him having sex with a man.

The holidays also mark the anniversary of Nate (Peter Krause) and Brenda (Rachel Griffiths), who visit Margaret (Joanna Cassidy). However, Brenda is shocked that Margaret is now taking care of Billy (Jeremy Sisto), who has left the hospital. Brenda is not content, as she believes she only brought him so she would not be alone rather than care for him. She continues having brief sexual encounters with men and discussing it with Melissa (Kellie Waymire). On Christmas Eve, Ruth visits Nikolai (Ed O'Ross), and is surprised to see that he was mugged. He decides to take him to her house, telling her family that he will stay with them for a few days. David (Michael C. Hall) convinces Keith (Mathew St. Patrick) to come along with Taylor (Aysia Polk) to the Christmas dinner.

Throughout the episode, flashbacks depict the last conversations that Nathaniel (Richard Jenkins) had with his family before his death; while he had mixed encounters with his children, he had a last tender moment with Ruth, and was on good terms with Rico, telling him to have a day off to be with his family. As David and Keith take Taylor home, they are surprised when Karla shows up with gifts. Nate and Brenda start having sex, but Nate has a severe seizure. He finally reveals his AVM to Brenda. While shocked, she comforts Nate. The following day, Nate finds that Johnson's wife has given him a motorcycle for helping with the funeral. He takes the motorcycle and rides off into the highway.

== Production ==
=== Development ===
The episode was written by supervising producer Scott Buck, and directed by Alan Taylor. This was Buck's first writing credit, and Taylor's first directing credit.

== Reception ==
=== Viewers ===
In its original American broadcast, "It's the Most Wonderful Time of the Year" was seen by an estimated 6.97 million household viewers with a household rating of 4.3. This means that it was seen by 4.3% of the nation's estimated households, and was watched by 4.52 million households. This was a 14% increase in viewership from the previous episode, which was watched by 6.10 million household viewers with a household rating of 4.0.

=== Critical reviews ===
"It's the Most Wonderful Time of the Year" received critical acclaim. John Teti of The A.V. Club wrote, "It's the most wonderful episode of the season, and I don't say that to cast aspersions on the other hours of Six Feet Under before and after this one. Not every episode can be like this — an hour in which so many threads, both in the episode and in the broader series, come together with consistent grace. Not every passage in a symphony can be the triumphant reprise. “It's The Most Wonderful Time Of The Year” is a reprise — explicitly so — and it's an artful one."

Entertainment Weekly gave the episode a "B+" grade, and wrote, "Aside from one nice shocker — the return of Billy — this is an oddly low-energy episode. Still, the details about the all-night biker funeral are the sort of quirky arcana that Six Feet exists to uncover." Mark Zimmer of Digitally Obsessed gave the episode a perfect 5 out of 5 rating, writing "Another top episode, which combines pathos and humor to striking effect. It's been a year since Ruth's husband died, and usual wish-fulfillment visions are replaced by the characters' memories of him, which are both tender and affecting. And Nate learns a thing or two about joie de vivre from the biker Santa's wife and friends, who celebrate the happiness of a life lived with gusto, rather than mourn his untimely death."

TV Tome gave the episode a perfect 10 out of 10 rating and wrote "I loved this episode to bits. Most shows go for the cheesy, sentimental slush, but thankfully Scott Buck avoids that but still commemorates Nate Sr in a respectful, but honest way for the main characters." Billie Doux of Doux Reviews gave the episode a perfect 4 out of 4 stars and wrote "Exceptionally clever, funny, well-written and moving episode." Television Without Pity gave the episode an "A" grade.

In 2016, Ross Bonaime of Paste ranked it 31st out of all 63 Six Feet Under episodes and wrote, "On the first anniversary of Nathaniel Fisher's death, everyone in the family remembers the last time they saw their father/husband/boss, while several of the living also return. Billy gets sprung out of the asylum and Karla comes back to play good guy with her daughter. After the first season, Nathaniel's appearances became much less common, but actually getting to see everyone's final moments with him adds more depth to the family and their individual and collective suffering. It's also the one-year anniversary for Brenda and Nate, and Nate finally tells Brenda about his AVM. He presents her with a newfound idea of living in the now, since tomorrow is not promised — especially considering the fact that his seizures are becoming more frequent."
