= The Invisible Woman (Six Feet Under) =

- Six Feet Under episode
- Episode no.: Season 2 Episode 5
- Directed by: Jeremy Podeswa
- Written by: Bruce Eric Kaplan
- Editing by: Sue Blainey
- Original release date: March 31, 2002
- Running time: 55 minutes

Guest appearances
- Adam Scott as Ben Cooper; Kellie Waymire as Melissa; Christine Estabrook as Emily Previn; Marina Black as Parker McKenna; Aysia Polk as Taylor; David Norona as Gary Deitman; Tim Maculan as Father Jack; Terrell Clayton as Eddie

Episode chronology
← Previous "Driving Mr. Mossback"	Next → "In Place of Anger"

"The Invisible Woman" is the fifth episode of the second season of the American drama television series Six Feet Under. It is the eighteenth overall episode of the series and was written by Bruce Eric Kaplan, and directed by Jeremy Podeswa. It originally aired on HBO on March 31, 2002.

The series is set in Los Angeles, and depicts the lives of the Fisher family, who run a funeral home, along with their friends and lovers. It explores the conflicts that arise after the family's patriarch, Nathaniel, dies in a car accident. In the episode, Ruth is shaken after finding that a deceased had no relatives or friends. Meanwhile, David meets a new man, while Claire finds that Parker is not a good influence for her.

According to Nielsen Media Research, the episode was seen by an estimated 5.37 million household viewers and gained a Nielsen household rating of 3.3. The episode received highly positive reviews from critics, with Frances Conroy receiving high praise for her performance in the episode.

== Plot ==
A woman, Emily Previn, arrives at her house and begins eating while reading a newspaper. Suddenly, she chokes and accidentally spills her water glass. As she walks to refill, she collapses, dying. Her body is found days later by the building manager after a woman complains about the smell.

David (Michael C. Hall) provides Nate (Peter Krause) with Emily's funeral arrangements, which were all done by herself a long time ago. Nate is shaken after finding that her family and friends have either moved out or died, and that she has no one left that cares for her. Claire (Lauren Ambrose) dismisses the woman as lonely, which upsets Ruth (Frances Conroy). Emily's death disturbs Ruth, who imagines herself dying in an empty house.

Brenda (Rachel Griffiths) starts writing a novel, but struggles with writer's block. She calls one of her clients, a prostitute called Melissa, and they agree to meet up. Brenda feels she is distancing from Nate, but Melissa suggests perhaps she is not ready for a big commitment. When a friend of Melissa cancels her plans to be a "watcher" while she performs oral sex on a man, Brenda volunteers to accompany her. Claire takes her SAT exam, and is shocked when she sees that a student pretends to be Parker to present it. She confronts her, and admits that her mother paid her $1,000 to secure a good college. Angry, Claire ends her friendship. She takes her anger at her counselor, Gary (David Norona), revealing that Parker wanted to sleep with him but he refused. While Gary understands her anger, he wants her to focus on how she wants to view herself.

Keith (Mathew St. Patrick) has taken Taylor (Aysia Polk) to live with him, but the stress affects his relationship with Eddie (Terrell Clayton). While on duty, he talks with his colleague about it, when they overhear a couple arguing. When the man pulls out a gun, they aim at him, telling him to drop it. When he turns around, Keith shoots him, killing him. While the event is seen as self-defense, Keith is shaken over having killed a person for the first time. David goes on a date with Ben Cooper (Adam Scott), and they set out to continue dating. However, David is visited by Keith, who is disturbed over the incident. They kiss and end up having sex, although Keith leaves the following morning. Feeling this was a mistake, he tells David they cannot be friends.

Inspired by her time with Melissa, Brenda surprises Nate by proposing to him. While taken aback, he accepts. When no one shows up for Emily's funeral, Ruth forces her children to accompany her in a ceremony presided by Father Jack (Tim Maculan). Afterwards, Ruth tells David, Nate and Claire that she fears becoming like Emily, and wants them to be more close with her. Later, Ruth cries as she stares on pictures of her children when they were younger.

== Production ==
=== Development ===
The episode was written by Bruce Eric Kaplan, and directed by Jeremy Podeswa. This was Kaplan's third writing credit, and Podeswa's second directing credit.

== Reception ==
=== Viewers ===
In its original American broadcast, "The Invisible Woman" was seen by an estimated 5.37 million household viewers with a household rating of 3.3. This means that it was seen by 3.3% of the nation's estimated households, and was watched by 3.52 million households. This was a 21% increase in viewership from the previous episode, which was watched by 4.43 million household viewers with a household rating of 2.7.

=== Critical reviews ===
"The Invisible Woman" received highly positive reviews from critics. John Teti of The A.V. Club wrote, "In contrast to the rather crudely sketched decedent of the week in “Driving Mr. Mossback,” Emily Previn plays a central role in “The Invisible Woman”: She sets an extreme benchmark against which the other characters are measured. They're measured in terms of “intimacy,” a theme that Ruth makes explicit after Emily's funeral."

Entertainment Weekly gave the episode an "A" grade, and wrote, "From the outset, Six's subject has been, in one form or another, the difficulty of forging connections — but it's never tackled it quite so forthrightly or as movingly as in this episode. Conroy's finest hour is also one of the series' best." Mark Zimmer of Digitally Obsessed gave the episode a 2 out of 5 rating, writing ""The Invisible Woman" is another fairly somber episode, without much of the gallows humor that makes Six Feet Under so much fun. Director Jeremy Podeswa uses long shots and slow zooms in to isolate the characters and emphasize their isolation, but also overlaps dialog from one scene to the next to bring them together."

TV Tome gave the episode a 9 out of 10 rating and wrote "Excellent episode and a testament to how wonderful this season is shaping up. It's just brilliant." Billie Doux of Doux Reviews gave the episode a 3 out of 4 stars and named it "The usual good SFU episode." Television Without Pity gave the episode a "B" grade.

In 2016, Ross Bonaime of Paste ranked it 27th out of all 63 Six Feet Under episodes and wrote, "Everyone that we've seen die prior to this episode on Six Feet Under has had someone that loved them, a family prepared to take care of the person that they have lost. “The Invisible Woman” presents us with Emily Previn, a woman who seemingly has no family or friends, and looks to have left no mark on the world. Previn's story works well alongside Claire's SAT stresses and her overwhelming fear that none of it really matters. And Ruth is afraid that one day she could become like Emily as well. “The Invisible Woman” has quite a few big developments — David and Keith hook up when they're supposed to be seeing other people, Brenda's sexual awakening begins and she proposes to Nate. But it's the vulnerability, fear and uncertainty of Emily Previn's death — and how the life she left behind manages to resonate beautifully with our characters — that makes this episode really stand out."
