= Someone Else's Eyes (Six Feet Under) =

- Six Feet Under episode
- Episode no.: Season 2 Episode 9
- Directed by: Michael Cuesta
- Written by: Alan Ball
- Cinematography by: Alan Caso
- Editing by: Tanya Swerling
- Original release date: April 28, 2002
- Running time: 56 minutes

Guest appearances
- Lili Taylor as Lisa Kimmel (special guest star); Jeremy Sisto as Billy Chenowith; Richard Jenkins as Nathaniel Fisher; Ed O'Ross as Nikolai; Dina Meyer as The Widow; Kellie Waymire as Melissa; Aysia Polk as Taylor; Joel Brooks as Robbie; Tim Maculan as Father Jack; Leeza Gibbons as Herself

Episode chronology
← Previous "It's the Most Wonderful Time of the Year"	Next → "The Secret"

"Someone Else's Eyes" is the ninth episode of the second season of the American drama television series Six Feet Under. It is the 22nd overall episode of the series and was written by series creator Alan Ball, and directed by Michael Cuesta. It originally aired on HBO on April 28, 2002.

The series is set in Los Angeles, and depicts the lives of the Fisher family, who run a funeral home, along with their friends and lovers. It explores the conflicts that arise after the family's patriarch, Nathaniel, dies in a car accident. In the episode, Nate is visited by his past, while Brenda continues having sex with strangers. Meanwhile, David faces challenges in his relationship with Keith, and the family is annoyed by Nikolai's presence in the house.

According to Nielsen Media Research, the episode was seen by an estimated 6.25 million household viewers and gained a Nielsen household rating of 4.0. The episode received positive reviews from critics, who praised the performances and emotional tone. For the episode, Lili Taylor received a nomination for Outstanding Guest Actress in a Drama Series at the 54th Primetime Emmy Awards.

== Plot ==
At a construction, two workers sit near the edge to lunch, discussing their problems. One of them complains about the sandwich that his wife cooked and tosses it back into his metal lunchbox. However, the strength causes the lunchbox to fall down, hitting a pedestrian, Dwight Garrison, in the head, killing him.

With the wedding coming up, Nate (Peter Krause) asks David (Michael C. Hall) to be his best man, which he accepts. While shopping at a grocery store, Nate runs into Lisa (Lili Taylor), who came from Seattle. Nate reveals his engagement, which appears to disappoint her. She suddenly reveals that she is five months pregnant, and that Nate is the father, as they had a sexual encounter back in Seattle. Nevertheless, Lisa makes it clear she does not expect anything from him, intending to raise the baby all by herself.

Claire (Lauren Ambrose) begins hanging up with Billy (Jeremy Sisto), despite Nate's insistence that this could be dangerous for her. As Claire is the only person who understands him, Billy allows her to photograph him naked. While Claire is fascinated, she also leaves soon after Billy asks her to photograph his frontal side. Brenda (Rachel Griffiths) attends a book signing, where she experiences hallucinations as she questions her relationship with Nate. After the author gives a speech, he and Brenda have sex. While Brenda is marveled by the experience, Melissa (Kellie Waymire) believes she might need therapy.

As Nikolai (Ed O'Ross) is now staying at the house, the Fishers are annoyed by his presence. At the flower shop, Ruth (Frances Conroy) is intimidated by a man and decides to check into Nikolai's books, finding many errors in accounting. When she confronts him, he admits that loan sharks were responsible for injuring him. After finding that his sister is still using drugs, Keith (Mathew St. Patrick) forces her to get into rehab again. This causes friction in his relationship with David, who feels sidelined by his behavior. Keith comes to understand this, and suggests David could move in with him, to his delight. That night, Billy sends the photographs to Claire, who is delighted with her new hobby.

== Production ==
=== Development ===
The episode was written by series creator Alan Ball, and directed by Michael Cuesta. This was Ball's fifth writing credit, and Cuesta's second directing credit.

== Reception ==
=== Viewers ===
In its original American broadcast, "Someone Else's Eyes" was seen by an estimated 6.25 million household viewers with a household rating of 4.0. This means that it was seen by 4% of the nation's estimated households, and was watched by 4.18 million households. This was a 11% decrease in viewership from the previous episode, which was watched by 6.97 million household viewers with a household rating of 4.3.

=== Critical reviews ===
"Someone Else's Eyes" received positive reviews from critics. John Teti of The A.V. Club wrote, "Billy says in this episode: “I think it really is impossible for somebody to see themselves. You need someone else's eyes.” The “someone else's eyes” phenomenon cuts both ways. Maybe you want to imagine yourself in someone else's eyes because you think they'll see something good, something worth preserving, that you can't see on your own. On other hand, maybe you hate the thought of someone else gazing deeply upon you, for fear that they'll see something you'd rather keep a secret."

Entertainment Weekly gave the episode a "B" grade, and wrote, "As with the preceding episode, ”Eyes” has one big jolt — in this case, Lisa's revelation — but the rest of it is slack, as if the series were hoarding its drama for the season's final episodes." Mark Zimmer of Digitally Obsessed gave the episode a 4 out of 5 rating, writing "Appropriately for an episode that deals with vision, there a striking lighting effects throughout, both in interiors and exteriors. Some of the interior shots are quite lovely, with large areas of dimness broken by pools of bright light. The topic of vision is carried further, in the plot and dialogue, and this episode is one of the more thematically consistent ones."

TV Tome gave the episode an 8 out of 10 rating and wrote "With only the season premier as his only credit so far, Alan Ball delivers another brilliant script with this insighful episode, laced with some nice foreshadowing for the final few episodes, great use of music." Billie Doux of Doux Reviews gave the episode a 3 out of 4 stars and wrote "This one was about the "lie of romance." That we need someone else to complete us, someone else to observe and tell us the truth about ourselves." Television Without Pity gave the episode a "B–" grade.

In 2016, Ross Bonaime of Paste ranked it 19th out of all 63 Six Feet Under episodes and wrote, "“Someone Else's Eyes” is a huge step forward for most of our characters — as the majority of Alan Ball written episodes are. Nate accidentally finds out that he impregnated Lisa, Keith and David move in together and most importantly, Claire discovers that she might have a real future in photography. Ball's writing is so excellent here, because he's able to present both sides to a single argument equally. For example, it's easy to see both Brenda and Nate as The Bad Guy in their relationship, or to understand why Keith would want space in his relationship, and why David should move in. Ball is able to handle conflict in a way that allows the viewer to have their own input into the intricacies of these character's lives — a gift that helps Six Feet Under resonate so well with its audience."

=== Accolades ===
For the episode, Lili Taylor received a nomination for Outstanding Guest Actress in a Drama Series at the 54th Primetime Emmy Awards. She would lose to Patricia Clarkson, who also guest starred and won for the series.
