= The Secret (Six Feet Under) =

- Six Feet Under episode
- Episode no.: Season 2 Episode 10
- Directed by: Alan Poul
- Written by: Bruce Eric Kaplan
- Cinematography by: Alan Caso
- Editing by: Michael Ruscio
- Original release date: May 5, 2002
- Running time: 57 minutes

Guest appearances
- Lili Taylor as Lisa Kimmel; Joanna Cassidy as Margaret Chenowith; Robert Foxworth as Bernard Chenowith; Ed O'Ross as Nikolai; Kellie Waymire as Melissa; Aysia Polk as Taylor; Marina Black as Parker McKenna; James Morrison as Swinger Husband; Kim Myers as Dr. Michaelson; Victor McCay as Claire's Teacher

Episode chronology
← Previous "Someone Else's Eyes"	Next → "The Liar and the Whore"

"The Secret" is the tenth episode of the second season of the American drama television series Six Feet Under. It is the 23rd overall episode of the series and was written by co-executive producer Bruce Eric Kaplan, and directed by executive producer Alan Poul. It originally aired on HBO on May 5, 2002.

The series is set in Los Angeles, and depicts the lives of the Fisher family, who run a funeral home, along with their friends and lovers. It explores the conflicts that arise after the family's patriarch, Nathaniel, dies in a car accident. In the episode, Nate faces uncertainty over his future with either Lisa or Brenda, while David and Keith get into another fight when Karla gets involved in another incident.

According to Nielsen Media Research, the episode was seen by an estimated 5.66 million household viewers and gained a Nielsen household rating of 3.6. The episode received positive reviews from critics, who praised the performances, writing and emotional tone. For the episode, Rachel Griffiths received a nomination for Outstanding Lead Actress in a Drama Series at the 54th Primetime Emmy Awards.

== Plot ==
Benjamin Srisai, an Asian retiree, is taking out his garbage bin from his property. However, he suffers a severe heart attack and collapses dead in his driveway.

Lisa (Lili Taylor) visits Nate (Peter Krause), wanting him to sign a custody paper where he signs away his parental rights. During the day, Nate begins to hallucinate seeing many children, who claim that they were aborted. Brenda (Rachel Griffiths) begins seeing a therapist, but maintains that her sex addiction is actually healthy for her. Her worries grow when she finds that her parents have reconciled. Brenda later joins Melissa (Kellie Waymire) at a swinger party; despite claiming she is just accompanying her, she ends up having sex with some of the guests.

While driving Taylor (Aysia Polk) in the car, Karla runs into a homeless man, and quickly engages in a hit-and-run. She does not want the cops involved, but Taylor tells it to David (Michael C. Hall). He in turn informs Keith (Mathew St. Patrick), who is very upset with the reveal. For a project at school, Claire (Lauren Ambrose) decides to photograph many corpses in the morgue, but Nate scolds her for doing it, as they could face a lawsuit. Nate also deals with Srisai's family, who explain that he wanted a Thai-Buddhist funeral.

When Ruth (Frances Conroy) tells her she admires her, Brenda decides to cut off her friendship with Melissa, blaming her for her addiction. Melissa does not fight back, lamenting that she blames anyone but herself. Keith is forced to call the cops to arrest Karla, disappointing Taylor. Nate explains his diagnosis to Lisa, telling her that he wants to be part of the child's life even if he knows he could die at any moment. However, Lisa rejects this, especially when Nate tells her that Brenda does not know yet. She walks away, telling him to stay out of her life.

== Production ==
=== Development ===
The episode was written by co-executive producer Bruce Eric Kaplan, and directed by executive producer Alan Poul. This was Kaplan's fourth writing credit, and Poul's first directing credit.

== Reception ==
=== Viewers ===
In its original American broadcast, "The Secret" was seen by an estimated 5.66 million household viewers with a household rating of 3.6. This means that it was seen by 3.6% of the nation's estimated households, and was watched by 3.81 million households. This was a 10% decrease in viewership from the previous episode, which was watched by 6.25 million household viewers with a household rating of 4.0.

=== Critical reviews ===
"The Secret" received positive reviews from critics. John Teti of The A.V. Club wrote, "Benjamin Srisai's on-screen life is a microcosm of one way that Six Feet Under treats its characters. The show puts people in a cycle and then whips them around in it until they experience some cataclysmic break — sometimes, death. Of course, you could make this observation about countless dramas, but Six Feet Under is especially ruthless about it. The show's grimmest quality might not be the constant death but rather its frequent observation that in life, people struggle mightily to effect even the slightest change in themselves. And then they die."

Entertainment Weekly gave the episode a "B+" grade, and wrote, "Karla's hit-and-run is among the season's more garishly ill-advised plot twists, especially since the rest of ”Secret” is smart and subtle drama. In a striking, melancholy sequence set to the chanting of Buddhist monks, everyone is depicted alone and miserable — just the sort of agreeable romanticization of depression that Six Feet Under does best." Mark Zimmer of Digitally Obsessed gave the episode a 3 out of 5 rating, writing "Not a bad episode, but not a great one either. Some of the visuals, such as a Buddhist funeral, are fairly striking, and some of the plot developments are interesting, but this is not the best that the Six Feet Under team can do."

TV Tome gave the episode a 9 out of 10 rating and wrote "Bloody brilliant, but then it seems that nearly every second episode is mandatory viewing and the writers have made a brilliant set up for the final three." Billie Doux of Doux Reviews gave the episode a 3 out of 4 stars and wrote "The advent of fatherhood was definitely getting to Nate. That dream he had about all the kids he could have fathered had an obvious meaning: Nate may be dying. What's the only way in which humans can continue to live on after they die?" Television Without Pity gave the episode a "C–" grade.

In 2016, Ross Bonaime of Paste ranked it 34th out of all 63 Six Feet Under episodes and wrote, "There are plenty of secrets that could be the eponymous one in the title — Nate's kid with Lisa, Brenda's sex addiction, Karla hiding the fact that she killed a homeless man in a hit-and-run. But the most moving might be Ruth's secret about Brenda. At Brenda's wedding shower, Ruth admits she loves her future daughter-in-law for being so carefree in a way that Ruth can never be. This leads to Brenda blaming everyone for her problems — everyone but herself — a very common theme in an entertaining, secret-heavy episode all about directing the problems you have in very misguided ways."

=== Accolades ===
Rachel Griffiths submitted the episode to support her nomination for Outstanding Lead Actress in a Drama Series at the 54th Primetime Emmy Awards. She would lose to Allison Janney for The West Wing.
