= Joseph Will =

American actor

- Education: Point Park University (BFA); Florida State University (MFA)

Joseph Will (born in Westminster, Maryland) is an American actor.

He attended Point Park University, graduating with a Bachelor of Fine Arts in theater, and later pursued his master's degree in acting from the Florida State University Conservatory of Actor Training, in Sarasota, Florida.

Will began his television career in a comic role on the Emmy Award-winning sitcom Frasier, opposite Kelsey Grammer and Patti Lupone. He has been featured in a number of prime time television shows, including NYPD Blue, CSI: Crime Scene Investigation, Will & Grace, Studio 60 on the Sunset Strip, Without a Trace, Shark, Life with Bonnie, and Eli Stone. His two most high-profile roles were on Star Trek: Enterprise where he played Crewman Michael Rostov and Star Trek: Voyager, where he played the Bronze Age alien, Kelis the poet, in episode "Muse" opposite Roxann Dawson and Kellie Waymire. He also had a little-known guest starring role, in the same Star Trek series, as a security officer in the acclaimed two-part episode "Workforce." In 2009, Will made a guest appearance as Doctor in an episode of Prison Break. In 2010, Will played Steven Wench in two episodes of The Mentalist.

Will began his career in theater in New York city appearing in numerous Off-Broadway productions.
