= EST and The Forum in popular culture =

Training sessions in pop culture

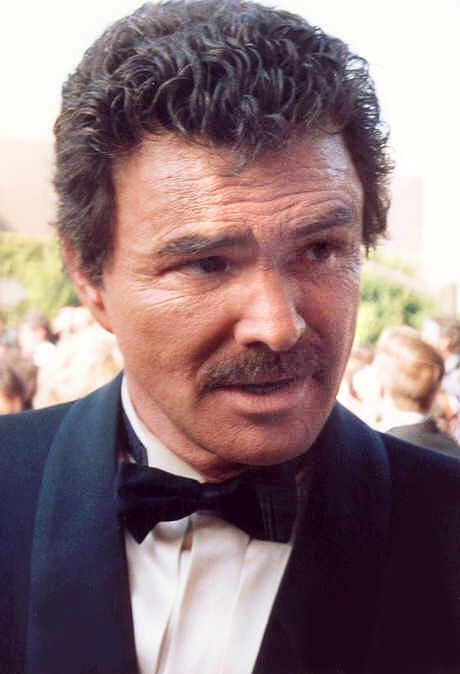
Leonard Maltin praised Burt Reynolds's charm in Semi-Tough, a film that parodied est.

Werner Erhard and his courses have been referenced in popular culture in various forms of fictional media including literature, film, television and theatre. The original course, known as est, was delivered by the company Erhard Seminars Training (est). Under the name The Forum, they were delivered by Werner Erhard and Associates. Also, the Landmark Forum, a program created by Erhard's former employees after purchasing his intellectual property, has had an influence on popular culture. Some of these works have taken a comedic tack, parodying Erhard and satirizing the methodology used in these courses.

Both est and The Forum have been depicted more often in film and television than in literary works. The 1977 film Semi-Tough satirized Erhard and the est Training, through the fictional "Bismark Earthwalk Action Training," in which Bert Convy portrayed a character said to have been a parody of Erhard. Diana Ross and Joel Schumacher, who had both taken the est training, incorporated Werner Erhard's teachings into the 1978 musical film, The Wiz. The 1990 film The Spirit of '76 also parodied est, with Rob Reiner portraying a trainer for the est-like "Be, Inc. Seminars." Movie critics have also drawn parallels to est and Werner Erhard, in reviews of the films Fight Club and Magnolia. Werner Erhard's training programs have been parodied in television. The 1979 episode of Mork & Mindy, "Mork Goes Erk", and the 2002 episode of Six Feet Under, "The Plan", are the most notable. In the Mork & Mindy episode, the Erhard parody character was played by David Letterman.

Madison, Wisconsin's Broom Street Theater produced a play about Werner Erhard and The Forum in 1995, called Devil In Paradise, The Fall and Rise of Werner Erhard. This piece presented a fictionalized version of controversial issues surrounding Erhard.

The third and fourth season of the FX series The Americans contains a story line in which several recurring characters attend the est Training in or near Washington, DC. In a recreation of the est Training, the lead character and Russian spy, Phillip, begins to confront his past and to question his purpose.

== Background ==
The est Training was a two-weekend, 60-hour course offered from late 1971 to late 1984. The purpose of the seminar was "to transform one's ability to experience living so that the situations one had been trying to change or had been putting up with, clear up just in the process of life itself." It "brought to the forefront the ideas of transformation, personal responsibility, accountability, and possibility."

== Music ==
John Denver wrote the song "Looking for Space" which was dedicated to Erhard, and became a theme song for est.

R.E.M. briefly referenced the est Training in their song "Country Feedback."

== Fiction ==
=== est and successors in literature ===
Depictions of est and The Forum in literature have dealt with direct references to these trainings, through such books as Werner Erhard, The Transformation of a Man, The Founding of est, by W.W. Bartley, III; 60 Hours that Transform Your Life, by Adelaide Bry; Getting It: The Psychology of est, by Sheridan Fenwick, est: Making Life Work, by Robert Hargrove; The est Experience by James Kettle; and The Book of est by Luke Rhinehart.

est was parodied in the March 1980 issue of the Marvel Comics Howard the Duck series, titled: "The Dreadcliff Cuckoos". In "The Dreadcliff Cuckoos", the character "Werner Blowhard" heads the organization "Bozoes Eagerly Serving Tyrants", abbreviated B.E.S.T. In his first appearance in the comic, Blowhard states "I've got It, Have you got It?". The "Werner Blowhard" character was later referenced in D. Keith Mano's 1982 novel, Take Five.

In Pressure Points, a 2001 novel by Larry Brooks, one of the book's protagonists asserts that the programs developed by Werner Erhard, William Penn Patrick, and Alexander Everett all came from the same source. The Program, a 2004 novel by Hurwitz, quotes Erhard prior to the opening of the prologue.

== Film ==
=== 1970s ===
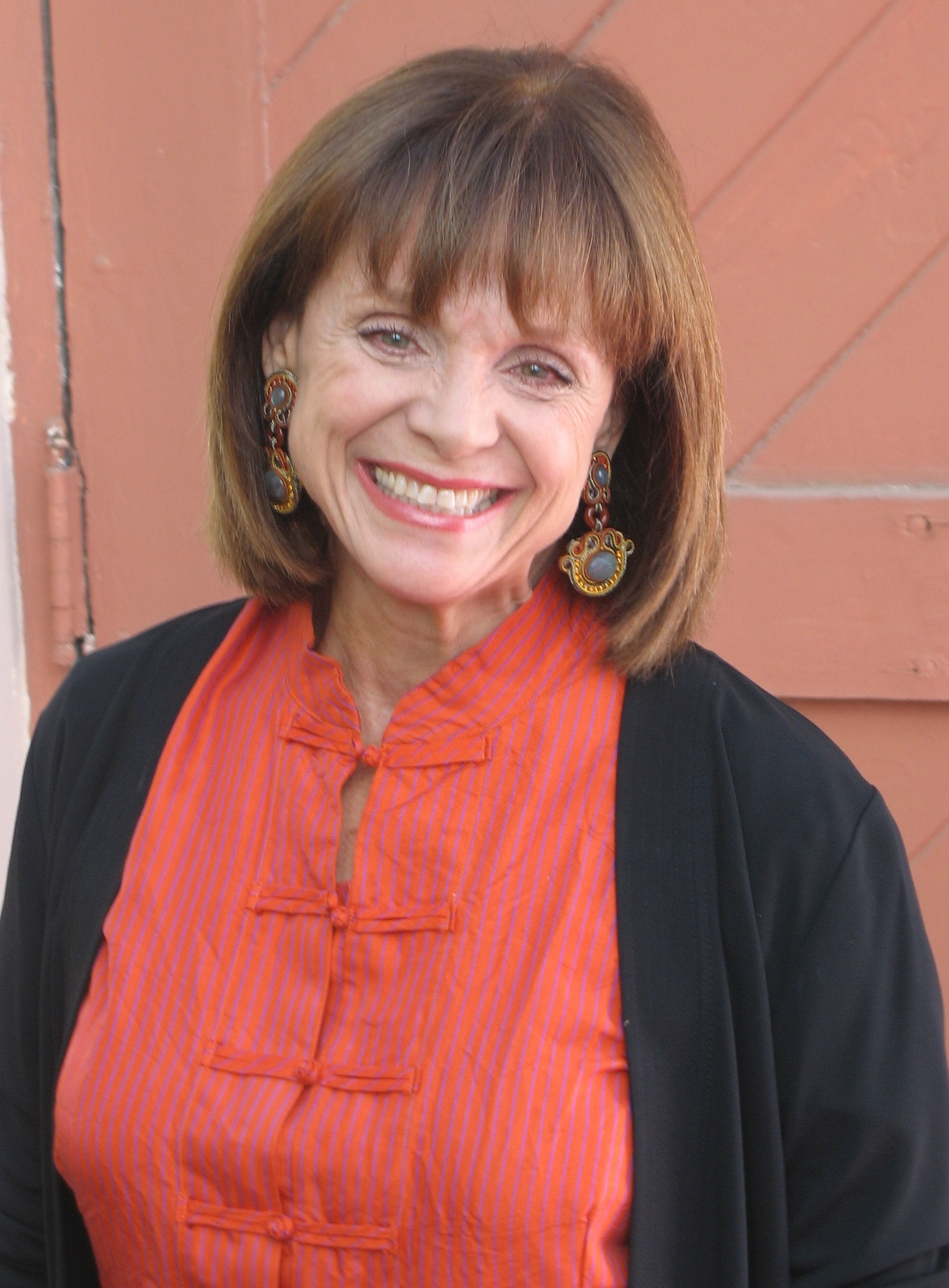
est advocate Valerie Harper contacted Bert Convy on behalf of Werner Erhard during the filming of Semi-Tough.

Werner Erhard and his est Training programs and later The Forum have been parodied in films, both directly and through more subtle references. Still in other films that did not directly intend to parody the subject matter, other reviewers have found elements of the est movement as applied to the genre of fictional self-help films. The 1977 movie Semi-Tough, starring Burt Reynolds, parodied the est training. Bert Convy played "Friedrich Bismark," a caricature of Werner Erhard. Bismark's organization and its training went by the name "B.E.A.T.", which stands for: "Bismark Earthwalk Action Training." In real life, Erhard had a Mercedes Benz with a license plate that said "SO WUT", in the film, Bismark rode in a limousine that said: "BEAT IT". A form of Rolfing was also parodied in the film, and Lotte Lenya's character "Clara Pelf", called PELFING", was described as: "a Rolf like masseuse." The press caught on to this satire of Erhard in the film, and gave these sections of the film positive reviews. The Wall Street Journal did not give an overall positive review, but did appreciate the portions where Werner Erhard was parodied: "The movie isn't much - an erratic ramble - But it has some pleasant moments, and a delicious send-up of The self-improvement guru Werner Erhard." The Charlotte Observer praised Bert Convy's portrayal of the self-help guru Frederick Bismark, writing: "Bert Convy is a hilariously smug consciousness-raiser with a more than passing resemblance to est's Werner Erhard." After the film's release, Bert Convy appeared on The Tonight Show and discussed his experiences when he attended an est training seminar in preparation for his role as Frederick Bismark. During actual filming on Semi-Tough, Convy received a late-night phone call from actress Valerie Harper, known in Hollywood as a devoted student of Werner Erhard. She related to Convy that Erhard was "pleased" with the role, and she wished him success in the film. However, Convy suspected that her real reason for calling was to subtly pressure him to go easy on his parody of Erhard in the film. However, several EST graduates shunned the film for making fun of the training, its methods, its philosophy, as well as Werner Erhard, himself.

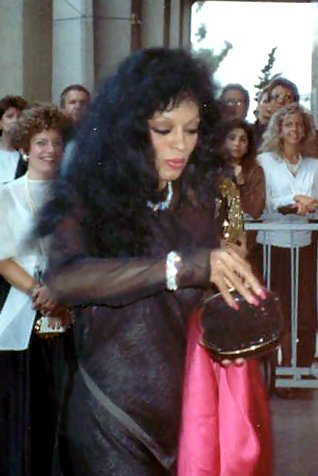
est student Diana Ross worked some of Werner Erhard's teachings into the film version of The Wiz.

The Grove Book of Hollywood wrote that the 1978 film, The Wiz was influenced by Werner Erhard's teachings and est because actress Diana Ross and writer Joel Schumacher were "very enamored of Werner Erhard." The film's producer Rob Cohen noted that: "before I knew it, the movie was becoming an est-ian fable full of est buzzwords about knowing who you are and sharing and all that. I hated the script a lot. But it was hard to argue with Diana because she was recognizing in this script all of this stuff that she had worked out in est seminars." Schumacher spoke positively of the results of the est training, saying: "I will be eternally grateful for learning that I was responsible for my life." Of est and Erhard references in the film itself, The Grove Book of Hollywood notes that the speech delivered by the Good Witch, played by actress Lena Horne, at the end of the film was "a litany of est-like platitudes," and the book also makes est comparisons to the song "Believe in Yourself."

In the 1979 film Manhattan, Woody Allen's character Isaac Davis says of his first wife, "She was a kindergarten teacher, then she got into drugs and moved to San Francisco. She went to est, became a Moonie. She works for the William Morris Agency now.".

=== 1980s ===
Circle of Power, also known as Mystique, Brainwash and The Naked Weekend, is a 1981 film, co-produced by Gary Mehlman, Anthony Quinn and Jeffrey White, and based on the non-fiction book The Pit: A Group Encounter Defiled. It stars Yvette Mimieux in her final film performance.

=== 1990s ===
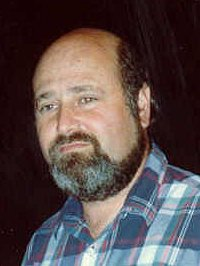
Rob Reiner portrayed "Dr. Cash", a parody of Werner Erhard, in the 1990 film The Spirit of '76.

In the 1990 film The Spirit of '76, Rob Reiner plays "Dr. Hedley Cash" (referred to only as "Dr. Cash" in the film), an abusive trainer for the est-like "Be, Inc. Seminars" who traps time-traveler Heinz-57 (played by Geoff Hoyle) in one of his seminars and continually refers to him as "Heinz Asshole". In the DVD commentary for the 2003 release of the film, director Lucas Reiner stated that the "Absentee, oblivious, self-involved parents who don't notice their kids have a spaceship" was a reference to the self-involved nature of adults during the 1970s and their propensity for self-improvement. Reiner stated that these scenes were meant to symbolize the "'70s hunger for self-improvement" and the extreme ends that people would go to in order to improve themselves. Lucas Reiner had never personally attended one of Werner Erhard's seminars, but had heard that attendants were not allowed to leave, often peed in their pants, and were called "assholes" and insulted publicly. Reiner noted that once his brother Carl put on the "Dr. Cash" costume, he played his character perfectly.

Heavyweights, a 1995 comedy film, portrays a fat camp for kids that is taken over by fitness guru Tony Perkis, played by Ben Stiller. In a review of the film in The Washington Post, Hal Hinson compared Stiller's portrayal of the Perkis character to Erhard, and called him "the Werner Erhard of slide aerobics".

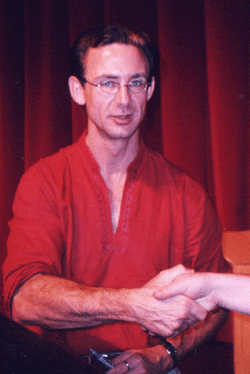
Fight Club author Chuck Palahniuk's work was influenced by his experiences in the Landmark Forum.

Fight Club author Chuck Palahniuk was a graduate of The Landmark Forum, or "The Forum" for short, and this later influenced his work. In his review of the 1999 film adaptation of the book, Roger Ebert likened the character Tyler Durden to Werner Erhard. Ebert wrote that Tyler Durden was: "...a bully--Werner Erhard plus S & M, a leather club operator without the decor." Fight Club film producer Ross Grayson Bell believes that his "creative synchronicity" with writer Palahniuk was due to their shared experience of attending The Forum.

In the 1999 film Magnolia, Tom Cruise played a motivational guru named Frank T.J. Mackey, who was the author of a self-help book called Seduce and Destroy. This work was meant to teach men how to get women to sleep with them. The Frank T.J. Mackey character in the film has been likened to: "a sort of pop-TV blend of Werner Erhard and Bob Guccione, strutting around a stage with cocksure arrogance, indoctrinating his acolytes in the arts of machismo and seduction". The Frank T.J. Mackey character has also been compared to another motivational trainer influenced by Erhard, in Details Magazine.

== Television ==
=== Mork & Mindy ===
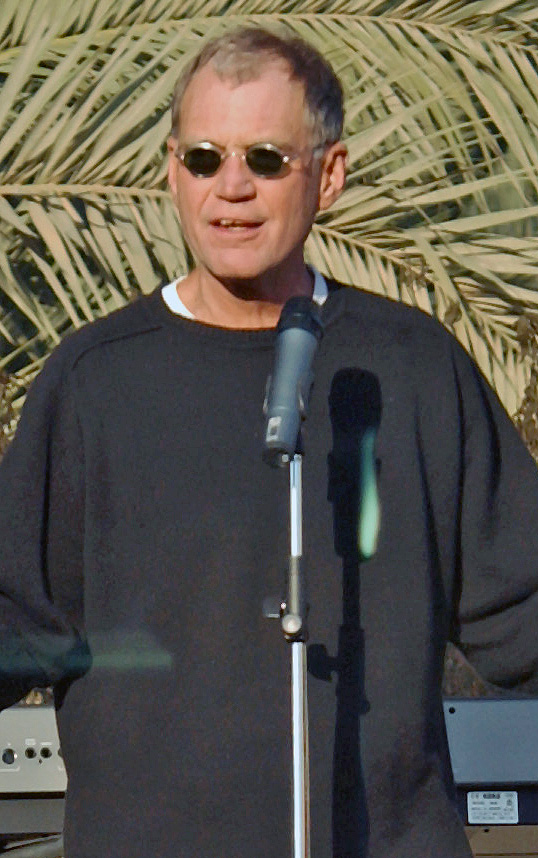
David Letterman portrayed a parody of Werner Erhard in an episode of Mork & Mindy called "Mork Goes Erk."

Parody and satire of est and The Forum in television has taken a more direct approach than in literature and film. Characters have been shown attending seminars, and having negative outcomes as a result. Mork & Mindy dealt with this in a lighter fashion, dealing with a small introduction of individuals to the training in a home environment, in season one, episode seventeen: "Mork Goes Erk." In the episode, David Letterman portrayed an Erhard-like character by the name of "Ellsworth" offering ERK or Ellsworth Revitalization Konditioning. In a 1982 article in the journal Theory & Society, Lewis & Clark College sociology professor Robert Goldman compared and contrasted Letterman's "Ellsworth" character and his training program to that of Werner Erhard. Goldman noted that the episode spent time: "lampooning Werner Erhard and est-like commercial pop psychologies." However, Goldman went on to note that the inherent problem with "Ellsworth Revitalization Konditioning" was not the training - but Ellsworth himself. Ellsworth is seen not just as a parody of Werner Erhard, but also of consumerism: "As the self-help entrepreneur, Ellsworth is portrayed as a walking collection of lifestyle-status points and sign-values ("I've got my Rolls-Royce!"). Conspicuous consumption and commodity fetishism define his personality." Goldman explained that the Mork and Mindy episode succeeded in distinguishing between criticism of the Ellsworth training, and criticism of Ellsworth, citing Ellsworth's character traits of: "tyranny, selfishness, open greed, and flaunting of the accoutrements of his vulgar money-making." In the end of the segment of the episode parodying est, Mork wins out over the Ellsworth philosophy by instead calling to mind universal humanistic moral values. David Letterman received positive praise for his portrayal of "Ellsworth" in the episode.

=== Six Feet Under ===
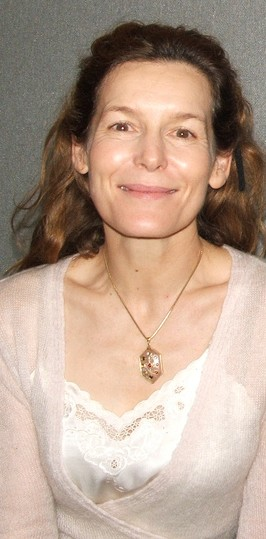
Alice Krige portrayed a seminar leader of "The Plan" (a parody on "The Forum") in the 2002 Six Feet Under episode, "The Plan".

Six Feet Under Episode 16, of Season 2, "The Plan", featured a seminar-delivery organization called "The Plan", which the character Claire Fisher immediately compared to est. Actress Alice Krige portrays "Alma" the seminar leader of "The Plan" - who uses jargon related to the "blueprint" for building a house in order to convey concepts about self-improvement. She singles out the character Ruth and berates her for "tiptoeing around her own house like she's afraid of waking someone up." Ruth begins to use jargon from the course in her conversations with family, and complains to her daughter that she cannot yet go to sleep after coming home from her seminar because she must first do "homework" from the course. This homework includes writing a letter to her dead mother forgiving her for "all the terrible things she did to me", and writing a letter to herself, describing how she will "renovate" her life. During the following day of "The Plan", the seminar leader gives the group a new assignment: to go outside to ready banks of phones, and call their family members to inform them of specifically how they wish to "renovate their homes" together. In the seminar, the leader asks everyone to close their eyes and imagine that everyone else is laughing at them for being stupid, and then asks the participants if they get the joke. Everyone does, except Ruth, who rants at the course instructor. After her rant, the leader congratulates her for "knocking down her old house", and proceeds to tell her that now she can rebuild a new house.

Analysis in secondary sources and books on Six Feet Under have compared the training in "The Plan" to the current incarnation of Erhard's trainings, Landmark Education. Reading Six Feet Under: TV to Die For by Akass et al. have compared "The Plan" to est and The Forum. Akass cites the episode while analyzing the phenomenon of self-improvement, and notes that: "Repairing her shingles often leaves Ruth in shackles." She writes that: "the series performs the logic of self-help, both its silly and seductive sides." However, she also points out that Ruth's rant at the end of her seminar is cathartic for Ruth, and she ends her analysis of the episode by asking: "So, what do we make of our times when all this supposed nonsense actually works?"

=== The Americans ===
The third and fourth season of the FX series The Americans contains a story line in which several recurring characters attend the est Training in or near Washington, DC. In a recreation of the est Training, the lead character and Russian spy, Phillip, begins to confront his past and to question his purpose.

=== Play for Today ===
A 1979 episode of Play for today titled "Instant Enlightenment Including VAT" parodied EST. The character Malcolm, a journalist, looking to do a hatchet job on the organisation Avatar, buy attending the 3-day seminar, ends up becoming a convert, while Melanie, who seems to be a convert, reveals at the end that she is not fooled by it, but came along to find her son, who was meant to go to Cambridge but instead attended a seminar and whom she has not seen since.

== Theatre ==
In 2008, Climate Theater in San Francisco, California showed a play called The Group, written by Robert Quillen Camp and performed by Ryan Eggensperger, and inspired, according to Climate "by the largely American tradition of packaging and selling self-empowerment, from est and the Landmark Forum to Norman Vincent Peale and The Secret". The play is an immersive performance piece where audience members sit in a circle and wear audio headsets, through which they listen to the charismatic leader's voice and sound effects. The production ran from May 29, 2008 to June 14, 2008.

Robert Avila of the San Francisco Bay Guardian called The Group: "in-your-face comedy in a droll send-up of est-like self-actualization programs," and a spoof of "recent incarnations" including The Secret and Landmark Forum. Avila gave the play a positive review, noting its "inspired writing, sharp humor, and simple yet slick production". In a review of the play for the San Jose Mercury News, Karen D'Souza wrote: From est to 'The Secret,' this is a playful lampoon of 'healing philosophies'". D'Souza also reviewed the play positively, writing: " Writer-director Robert Quillen Camp slyly pokes fun at reducing the human experience to one-size-fits-all platitudes and besmirching belief systems with "cash-only" workshops." Pat Craig wrote in Contra Costa Times: "After a lifetime of enduring various human potential programs, from the chanted mantras of transcendental meditation to the institutionalized loathing of est, 'The Group' seems a bit tame for satire to a veteran of the high-profit mind games." In a review for the San Francisco Examiner, Leslie Katz said, "In the end, the show provides excellent therapy. As those who aren't swayed by expensive self-help seminars know, laughter is indeed the best medicine."

== See also ==
- Human Potential Movement
- Large Group Awareness Training
- Parody religion
- Popular culture
- Religious satire
- Self-help
