= Back to the Garden (Six Feet Under) =

- Six Feet Under episode
- Episode no.: Season 2 Episode 7
- Directed by: Dan Attias
- Written by: Joey Soloway
- Cinematography by: Alan Caso
- Editing by: Michael Ruscio
- Original release date: April 14, 2002
- Running time: 56 minutes

Guest appearances
- Patricia Clarkson as Sarah O'Connor; Joanna Cassidy as Margaret Chenowith; Molly Parker as Rabbi Ari; Ed O'Ross as Nikolai; Joel Brooks as Robbie; Justina Machado as Vanessa Diaz; Aysia Polk as Taylor; Kellie Waymire as Melissa; Stark Sands as Toby; Terrell Clayton as Eddie; Sara Mornell as Jessica Shapiro; Lee Garlington as Fiona

Episode chronology
← Previous "In Place of Anger"	Next → "It's the Most Wonderful Time of the Year"

"Back to the Garden" is the seventh episode of the second season of the American drama television series Six Feet Under. It is the 20th overall episode of the series and was written by producer Joey Soloway, and directed by Dan Attias. It originally aired on HBO on April 14, 2002.

The series is set in Los Angeles, and depicts the lives of the Fisher family, who run a funeral home, along with their friends and lovers. It explores the conflicts that arise after the family's patriarch, Nathaniel, dies in a car accident. In the episode, David and Keith try to resume their relationship, while Nate consults with a rabbi on the concept of death. Meanwhile, Claire goes with Sarah to a party for the weekend.

According to Nielsen Media Research, the episode was seen by an estimated 6.10 million household viewers and gained a Nielsen household rating of 4.0. The episode received highly positive reviews from critics, who praised the performances, pacing and tone. For the episode, Patricia Clarkson won Outstanding Guest Actress in a Drama Series at the 54th Primetime Emmy Awards.

== Plot ==
Jeffrey Shapiro goes to his private gym room, where he starts watching porn. He uses a weight machine to place his belt on his neck, performing erotic asphyxiation on himself. However, he gets stuck on the belt and ends up suffocating.

Keith (Mathew St. Patrick) begins to fantasize that he and David (Michael C. Hall) resume their relationship. After arguing with Eddie (Terrell Clayton), Keith decides to break up with him. He wants to be friends with David again, but he is still skeptical after Keith told him they could not be friends. Eventually, they agree to go on a first date, but their plans are cancelled when Taylor (Aysia Polk) has an emergency appendectomy. Keith blames himself for not prioritizing Taylor's pain, and gets into an argument with David. After talking with Keith and staying with her, Keith finds that David stayed in the hospital for the night.

Nate (Peter Krause) consults with Rabbi Ari (Molly Parker), who is working on Shapiro's Jewish funeral, to talk over the concept of death. She explains that she does not think of death and that her life seeks to honor God, while Nate admits his own uncertainty regarding God's existence. She also states she cannot save him, and that only Brenda (Rachel Griffiths) can make him change for the better. During this, Brenda meets with Margaret (Joanna Cassidy), who is delighted after finally separating from her husband. Brenda wants to help her move on, but Margaret reiterates she does not need her. Rico (Freddy Rodriguez) suspects his cousin Ramon is having sex with Vanessa, but when he comes home early he catches Ramon with another man. While upset as his children could have seen him, he covers for him with their wives.

Claire (Lauren Ambrose) visits Sarah (Patricia Clarkson) on the weekend of a big party, despite Ruth (Frances Conroy) opposing. Bored with the lifestyle of Sarah's friends, Claire hangs out with a boy named Toby (Stark Sands), who does not want for their relationship to move past intimate. Sarah also has a conversation with Claire over their treatment of Ruth, asking her to not reject her. When she returns home, she finds Ruth alone, realizing she is not too different from Sarah's lifestyle.

== Production ==
=== Development ===
The episode was written by producer Joey Soloway, and directed by Dan Attias. This was Soloway's first writing credit, and Attias' first directing credit.

== Reception ==
=== Viewers ===
In its original American broadcast, "Back to the Garden" was seen by an estimated 6.10 million household viewers with a household rating of 4.0. This means that it was seen by 4% of the nation's estimated households, and was watched by 4.18 million households. This was an 8% decrease in viewership from the previous episode, which was watched by 6.60 million household viewers with a household rating of 4.1.

=== Critical reviews ===
"Back to the Garden" received highly positive reviews from critics. John Teti of The A.V. Club wrote, "Ruth was silent for years, and then she started expressing herself. And what did that get her? Nothing but humiliation. And so she returns to silence."

Entertainment Weekly gave the episode an "A" grade, and wrote, "After the season's slow start, the characters' plotlines now begin humming, and everyone gets at least one great scene. Case in point: Ruth singing along to her sister's tape of Joni Mitchell's ”Woodstock” is one of Six's most touching moments." Mark Zimmer of Digitally Obsessed gave the episode a 2 out of 5 rating, writing "Every season has its low points, and Back to the Garden is unfortunately one of them. It's neither visually interesting, nor particularly engrossing in terms of narrative. The usual Six Feet Under humor is conspicuously absent, and Brenda's visit and Rico's little surprise are the best things here. Joni Mitchell may have wanted us to "Go back to the Garden," but this garden has fallen a bit fallow."

TV Tome gave the episode an 8 out of 10 rating and wrote "The episode's only disappointment would be Ruth's further misery as the episode closes with her in the kitchen listening to one of Sarah's tapes and singing along sadly." Billie Doux of Doux Reviews gave the episode a 3 out of 4 stars and wrote "The middle-aged adults were cavorting about and acting like hormone-crazed teenagers, while Claire and the mature, designated driver, no-gratuitous-sex teenager, did the role reversal thing. This guy could be a much better choice for Claire than the tragically dysfunctional Gabe. Since he asked for her phone number, we'll probably find out." Television Without Pity gave the episode a "B–" grade.

In 2016, Ross Bonaime of Paste ranked it 40th out of all 63 Six Feet Under episodes and wrote, "To understand the gravity of this episode, we have to jump to the most beautiful moment, in its final scene, as Claire becomes aware that her mother isn't all that different from Ruth's hippie, artistic sister Sarah, who she looks up to. Deep down, the similarities between Ruth and Sarah are there, it's just that Ruth has seen more pain than she cares to make known. In one of Six Feet Under's most haunting scenes, Ruth sings along to Sarah's Joni Mitchell cassette, opening Claire's eyes to who her mother truly is. Even though “Back to the Garden” primarily features Nate and Brenda both trying to find themselves with other people outside their relationship and David getting close to a reunion with Keith, it's this small, hidden moment between daughter and mother that shows more than it tells."

=== Accolades ===
For the episode, Patricia Clarkson received a nomination for Outstanding Guest Actress in a Drama Series at the 54th Primetime Emmy Awards. She would win the award, becoming the first actress of the series to win an Emmy.
