= Good Shepherd (Star Trek: Voyager) =

- Star Trek: Voyager episode
- Episode no.: Season 6 Episode 20
- Directed by: Winrich Kolbe
- Story by: Dianna Gitto
- Teleplay by: Dianna Gitto; Joe Menosky
- Production code: 243
- Original air date: March 15, 2000

Guest appearances
- Jay Underwood - Mortimer Harren; Michael Reisz - William Telfer; Zoe McLellan - Tal Celes; Tom Morello - Mitchell; Kimble Jemison - Engineer

Episode chronology
← Previous "Child's Play"	Next → "Live Fast and Prosper"
- Star Trek: Voyager season 6

"Good Shepherd" is the 140th episode of the science fiction television series Star Trek: Voyager. It is the 20th episode of the show’s sixth season. Set in the Star Trek universe, a 24th century starship must survive while cut-off from the other side of the Galaxy with a motley collection of Federation, Maquis, and alien crew members.

Captain Janeway goes on an away mission with three troubled crew-members in a shuttle.

== Plot ==
After a routine shipwide efficiency analysis, Seven of Nine determines that three of Voyager's crewmen are not performing at acceptable levels. Whereas such a problem on a starship would normally be remedied by a transfer to less challenging assignments, this option is not available to the crew of the Voyager, which is stranded tens of thousands of light years from Earth.

Captain Janeway decides to take the three crewmen under her wing, and against the advice of Seven of Nine, brings them along on an astronomical study in the Delta Flyer in order to form a rapport with them. The three crewmen are science officer William Telfer, a hypochondriac; Tal Celes, a Bajoran whose substandard work requires constant double-checking by others; and the asocial Mortimer Harren, who is interested only in cosmological theories and has found an assignment where he can sequester himself on Deck 15 and pursue this subject between occasional duties.

During the mission, an unknown, invisible force strikes the Delta Flyer, knocking its propulsion offline and neutralizing 90% of its antimatter fuel. Janeway transmits a distress call to Voyager. Harren suggests that a comet-like assemblage of dark matter is responsible, and proposes ejecting the remaining antimatter, which will attract another impact; but Janeway declines, arguing that more evidence is needed for Harren’s theory before she will act on it. She decides to fire a photon torpedo at the force.

Suddenly, Telfer begins to dematerialize and disappear. When he reappears, he collapses, with something writhing beneath his skin. Janeway fires a phaser at him when it begins to manipulate his motor neurons, which causes a stick-like entity to burrow itself out of a wound on his neck. Janeway hopes it will now communicate with them, but is frustrated when Harren violates her explicit order and kills it with a phaser.

Janeway takes the Delta Flyer to a nearby gas giant planet to reinitialize its warp core, but an unseen, invisible object begins displacing the fragments of the planet’s ring, cutting a swath heading straight for the Flyer. Janeway orders the others into the escape pods, but Celes and Telfer adamantly remain, while Harren heads to his escape pod for the object in order to give the Flyer time to escape. Janeway beams him back with the transporter, and then fires the Flyer’s phasers at a fragment of the ring in front of the object, igniting a chain reaction. A bright light explodes throughout the Flyer.

Janeway awakens in sickbay. First Officer Commander Chakotay explains that after receiving her distress call, Voyager found the Flyer drifting above the gas giant with all four crew members unconscious. Janeway observes that in looking for lost members of her flock, the Good Shepherd ended up running into a wolf, but that in the end, she did find them.

== Casting ==
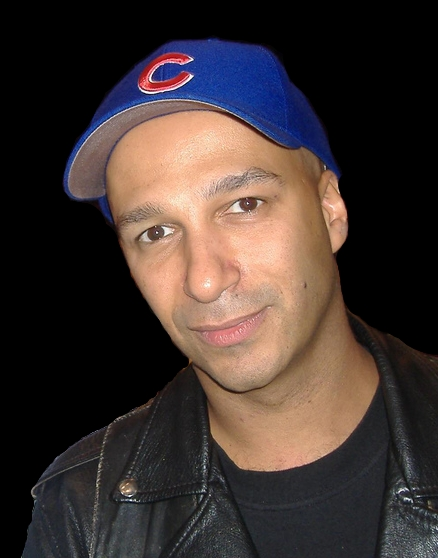
Musician Tom Morello made a cameo appearance as Crewman Mitchell.

Crewman Mitchell, who greets Janeway in Act One, is played by Tom Morello, guitarist of Rage Against the Machine and Audioslave. In 1998, Morello, who is a fan of Star Trek, contacted series producer Rick Berman for a cameo in the film Star Trek: Insurrection. Berman, one of whose sons was a fan of Rage Against the Machine, agreed. Although Morello was one of many aliens in a crowd shot in that film, he was later hired in January 1999 to appear as a human in "Good Shepherd". While Morello has only a few lines as Crewman Mitchell, Berman commented: "He did a great job. It was a little pick-me-up for everyone."

== Reception ==
Jammer's Reviews ranked "Good Shepherd" with 3 out of 4 stars with a summation of "Fresh and entertaining on the whole, but where's the ending?" Jamahl Epsicokhan highly recommended the "bulk" of the show saying it was a "break from the routine" and describing the "casual dialog" as "skillfully conceived" to "understand these people and their personalities, problems, and quirks...we grow to care about them." He commented that the episode had "the right approach, emphasizing character interaction and discussion." He also noted a similarity to Star Trek's later offering, Lower Decks, which emphasized the rank-and-file crewmen, as opposed to the senior staff.

== Releases ==
This episode was released as part of a season 6 DVD boxset on December 7, 2004.
