= Live Fast and Prosper =

- Star Trek: Voyager episode
- Episode no.: Season 6 Episode 21
- Directed by: LeVar Burton
- Written by: Robin Burger
- Production code: 242
- Original air date: April 19, 2000

Guest appearances
- Kaitlin Hopkins – Dala / "Kathryn Janeway"; Gregg Daniel – Mobar / "Tuvok"; Francis Guinan – Zar / "Chakotay"; Dennis Cockrum – Orek; Scott Lincoln – Miner #1; Timothy McNeil – Miner #2; Ted Rooney – Varn

Episode chronology
← Previous "Good Shepherd"	Next → "Muse"
- Star Trek: Voyager season 6

"Live Fast and Prosper" is the 141st episode of Star Trek: Voyager, the 21st episode of the sixth season. In the 24th-century science fiction universe of Star Trek, the crew of the USS Voyager must contend with identity thieves in the Delta Quadrant.

== Plot ==
Two people beam down to a mining colony. They introduce themselves as Captain Janeway and Tuvok, but they are imposters. The miners, unaware of any deception, agree to a trade: "Janeway" promises to beam down a supply of dilithium in exchange for a load of bolomite. She and "Tuvok" are well-practiced in their roles and knowledgeable about their characters; the miners trust them and are impressed with their generosity: "Janeway" says she plans to use the bolomite to help a colony of orphans. Back aboard their ship, "Janeway" and crew receive their shipment and speed away without delivering any dilithium. The scam was a success.

Meanwhile, on Voyager the genuine crew is having problems. A faulty component in Neelix's galley has disrupted systems all over the ship. It seems he picked up the component as a trade, in exchange for a load of supplies that he sent to a shelter for orphans, and failed to test it before installing it. In the middle of the mess the ship gets a call from Orek, the head of mining operations at a nearby planet. He is angry that Janeway has run off without dropping off the dilithium she had promised him. Naturally, she has no idea what he is talking about.

Orek shows her a recording of "Janeway" making the agreement with the miners. At the mention of orphans, an annoyed Janeway starts putting the pieces together. She sits Neelix down and listens as he explains where he got his kitchen component. He and Paris encountered a nun called Dala a few weeks back, and got to know her and her companion Mobar (a pair who look suspiciously like "Janeway" and "Tuvok"). They brought the two on board the Delta Flyer to negotiate a trade, giving them an opportunity to surreptitiously download information about Voyager. They then used what they had learned to pose as Janeway and Tuvok.

Orek agrees to let Janeway hunt down the impostors, who happen to be right in the middle of cheating someone else. The newest victim realizes he is being tricked, and seizes Dala's ship. Assuming Voyager is in on the scam, he fires at that ship as well. Janeway attempts to turn the tables and seize both ships so she can explain, but is fired on again. Dala's ship gets away, but the real Janeway beams her impostor aboard first, and Voyager also gets away.

Neelix meets the prisoner in the brig, trying to find a spark of honesty in her. Just as he appears to be making friends with her, she grabs his phaser and runs. Already familiar with the layout of the ship and the workings of the Delta Flyer, she escapes, steals the Flyer, and returns to her co-conspirators. But this was actually Janeway's plan: Paris and the Doctor are hiding on board the Flyer.

Preparing to flee the area, the thieves return to the caves where they have stashed all the booty stolen from their numerous victims. Dala then surprises her cohorts by turning on them. She subdues them with a weapon and then contacts Voyager, which is waiting for her call. When her fellow thieves demand an explanation, she adjusts her mobile emitter — she is really the Doctor in disguise. The real Tuvok arrives and takes the thieves captive; the real Dala awakens on the Delta Flyer, where Paris is holding her at bay.

Voyager returns all the stolen goods to their rightful owners.

== Production ==
This episode was directed by LeVar Burton, who directed several other episodes in the series. Burton played Geordi La Forge, first appearing in the series Star Trek: The Next Generation and reprising that role in the episode "Timeless", which he also directed. Overall, Burton would direct eight episodes of Voyager.

== Reception ==
Tor.com gave the episode a rating of nine out of ten.

== Releases ==
This episode was released as part of a Season 6 DVD boxset on December 7, 2004.
