= Mork Goes Erk =

- Mork & Mindy episode
- Episode no.: Season 1 Episode 17
- Directed by: Howard Storm
- Written by: Lloyd Turner; Gordon Mitchell
- Cinematography by: Stephen H. Burum; F. Bud Mautino, Meredith M. Nicholson
- Production code: Episode 018
- Original air date: February 8, 1979

Guest appearances
- Morgan Fairchild as Susan; Conrad Janis as Fred "Fredzo" McConnell; David Letterman as Ellsworth

Episode chronology
← Previous "Snowflakes Keep Dancing on My Head"	Next → "Yes Sir, That's My Baby"

"Mork Goes Erk" is the seventeenth episode of the first season of the American television sitcom Mork & Mindy. The episode aired on ABC on February 8, 1979. It was issued on VHS on January 1, 1998, as part of a two-episode special release that also included "Mork's First Christmas". It was issued on DVD on September 7, 2004, as part of the Mork & Mindy - The Complete First Season boxed set.

The episode was written by Lloyd Turner and Gordon Mitchell and directed by Howard Storm. In the episode, David Letterman portrays a self-help group leader named Ellsworth who offers "erk" (Ellsworth Revitalization Konditioning). The episode has been called a parody of the Erhard Seminars Training, or "est" course. The episode received mostly positive reviews, and was highlighted as one of the season's best episodes. David Letterman's performance also received good reviews.

== Plot ==
Mork, Mindy and Mr. Bickley are all feeling depressed. Mindy has just learned that Mork's supervisor, Orson, has arranged for Mork to be transferred to another planet, and Bickley is suffering from writer's block. Their friend, Susan, visits and suggests that they all attend a seminar on Ellsworth's Revitalization Konditioning. As they arrive at the seminar, Ellsworth nervously asks Susan if all of the attendees' checks are in order. He lays out the rules for the duration of the training, which include no leaving and no alcohol consumption. When Bickley hears this, he promptly gets up to leave.

The seminar's attendees are given Ellsworth's harsh version of reality. Ellsworth preaches self-adoration, which he says will get rid of emotional highs and lows. He centers this goal around the notion of "finding our own space", while utilizing an authoritarian style of control as a therapeutic method to solve problems. The other attendees are shown to be passive consumers who seek any way to fix their personal issues. However, Mork begins to question the foundation of the course's rules, as well as the nature of the philosophical material that Ellsworth has put forth, by pointing out hypocrisy among Ellsworth's contradictory statements. In the end, Mork triumphs over Ellsworth's philosophy with universal humanistic moral values. Ellsworth dismisses Mork's victory, exclaiming, "I've got my Rolls-Royce!". However, Ellworth has had his Rolls-Royce stolen.

== Cultural references ==
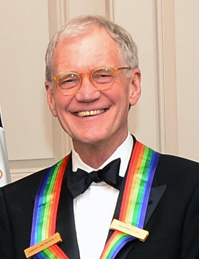
David Letterman portrays Ellsworth, a parody of Werner Erhard.

In a 1982 article in the journal, Theory & Society, Lewis & Clark College sociology professor, Robert Goldman, compared and contrasted Letterman's "Ellsworth" character and his training program to that of Werner Erhard's course, Erhard Seminars Training. Goldman noted that the episode spends time "lampooning Werner Erhard and est-like commercial pop psychologies". However, Goldman went on to note that the inherent problem with "Ellsworth Revitalization Konditioning" is not the training, but Ellsworth.

Ellsworth is seen as a parody of consumerism. "As the self-help entrepreneur, Ellsworth is portrayed as a walking collection of lifestyle-status points and sign-values... Conspicuous consumption and commodity fetishism define his personality." Goldman explained that this Mork and Mindy episode succeeds in distinguishing between criticism of Ellsworth's training, and criticism of Ellsworth, citing Ellsworth's character traits of "tyranny, selfishness, open greed, and flaunting of the accoutrements of his vulgar money-making".

== Reception ==
TV Guide's 2005 book, TV Guide: The Ultimate Resource to Television Programs on DVD, highlights "Mork Goes Erk" as one of three "classic episodes" of the first season (including "Mork's First Christmas" and "Mork's Mixed Emotions").

Matthew Tobey of Allmovie wrote that the episode was most notable because of David Letterman's appearance before he became more well-known. The Dallas Morning News also praised Letterman's performance as a "shady motivational speaker", commenting that the episode was a way for Letterman to hone his "smarminess" before his later work on Late Show with David Letterman. Jonathan Boudreaux of tvdvdreviews.com described Letterman as "a flakey EST-like guru", and called the episode "disjointed".

== See also ==
- est and The Forum in popular culture
- Human Potential Movement
- Large Group Awareness Training
- New age
- Parody
- Parody religion
- Pseudophilosophy
- Self-help
