= Muse (Star Trek: Voyager) =

- Star Trek: Voyager episode
- Episode no.: Season 6 Episode 22
- Directed by: Mike Vejar
- Written by: Joe Menosky
- Production code: 244
- Original air date: April 26, 2000

Guest appearances
- Joseph Will as Kelis; Kellie Waymire as Layna / "B'Elanna Torres" / "Seven of Nine"; Stoney Westmoreland as Patron; Kathleen Garrett as Tanis / "Kathryn Janeway"; Michael Houston King as Jero / "Harry Kim" / "Tom Paris" / "Tuvok" / "Chakotay"; Jack Axelrod as Chorus #1; John Schuck as Chorus #2; Tony Amendola as Chorus #3

Episode chronology
← Previous "Live Fast and Prosper"	Next → "Fury"
- Star Trek: Voyager season 6

"Muse" is the 142nd episode of Star Trek: Voyager, the 22nd episode of the sixth season.

The main cast character B'Elanna Torres is stranded in an ancient Greek-like society on an away mission gone wrong. Voyager struggles with a search.

The episode costumes were nominated for an Emmy award.

== Plot ==
An enraptured audience watches a play in a stone amphitheatre. The main characters are called B'Elanna Torres and Harry Kim, and they are on an adventure seeking dilithium when they are in a shipwreck. Harry gets out in an escape pod but B'Elanna crashes and is injured. Kelis the Poet, the playwright, steps in and narrates his rescue of B'Elanna. The audience is pleased by this interesting and creative plot twist. Afterwards, Kelis is congratulated by his wealthy patron who demands to see another play about these Voyager adventures - and he wants it done in one week. Desperate for a new story, Kelis travels to the source of his inspiration: The wreckage of the Delta Flyer which sits on a mountainside outside the village. Kelis creeps in and finds B'Elanna's unconscious body where he left her, tied up and with one of her arms covered with bloody slashes. B'Elanna has crash landed on a pre-warp society planet whose culture is similar to ancient Greece.

Well-meaning Kelis has been bleeding her, trying to treat the fever that has kept her incapacitated for the eight days since the crash. She has now recovered enough to fight back, so she directs him to heal her cuts with a dermal regenerator. When the cuts disappear, he is convinced she is really an "Eternal", a god in his people's ancient sagas. From his exploration of the computer and B'Elanna's logs, he knows that her fellow "gods" await her on a great ship called Voyager.

Despite B'Elanna supposedly being an Eternal, Kelis is not afraid to negotiate with her. B'Elanna promises to tell Kelis more stories he can use for his plays if he unties her. When he does, she grabs a phaser and chases him off. As she works to get the Flyer running again, the bold playwright returns with food, asking to hear stories in return for it. She is more interested in getting off the planet so she demands he bring her some dilithium. It is a common mineral in the area and he knows where to get it, but he will have to risk trespassing on his patron's property to harvest it. He decides it is worth it to hear more tales about Voyager.

Meanwhile, the Voyager crew has been spending over a week searching for their lost crewmates. Janeway reluctantly calls off the search for B'Elanna and Harry. Tom Paris is especially distraught, not wanting to accept the loss of his girlfriend and best friend respectively. Kelis works on his play which will feature more of the crew, but he is having trouble understanding the motivations of these strange characters. He pesters B'Elanna for more information about them and the two work out more arrangements: he brings her resources and she tells him about her crewmates.

Kelis has more reason to write a great play when his patron begins fighting with his enemy. If a war were to break out, B'Elanna would be discovered and captured, so she agrees to go back to the amphitheatre with Kelis. She sees how the play is progressing and is nauseated by all the romance. She insists there are more inspirational stories to tell. When he hears about the Borg and Janeway's Starfleet pacifism, he decides to write a tale of peace that will send a message to his patron.

Finally, Harry Kim shows up after having walked 200 kilometers from his own crashed escape pod. He has an emergency transmitter but no power, and once they plug it into the Flyer they are able to send a message to Voyager. The ship heads back to pick them up after receiving the message while still in range. On performance night, Kelis worries that his ending is not good enough to impress his patron. He sends a panicked message to B'Elanna, who comes back to help him end the play. She becomes an Eternal before the audience's very eyes when she is beamed away, making the play one that the patron will not forget.

== Production ==
This episode was written by Joe Menosky and directed by Mike Vejar.

Guest stars include Joseph Will, Kellie Waymire, Tony Amendola, Jack Axelrod, Michael Houston King, Kathleen Garrett, Stoney Westmorland, and John Schuck. Majel Barrett does voice acting as a computer voice.

== Reception ==
Jammer's Reviews gave the episode 3.5 out of 4.

This episode was nominated for an Emmy award for outstanding costumes.

== Releases ==
This episode was released as part of a season 6 DVD boxset on December 7, 2004.

== Bibliography ==
- Meyer, Uwe (2009). "„Die Muse“ – Populäre Antikerezeption am Beispiel einer Episode der Fernsehserie Star Trek: Voyager". In: Pegasus-Onlinezeitschrift IX/2, 2009. Retrieved on 2012-04-14 from http://www.pegasus-onlinezeitschrift.de/2009_2/erga_2_2009_meyer.pdf.
