= The Pitts =

American television series

- The cast (from left to right): David Henrie as Petey, Kellie Waymire as Liz, Lizzy Caplan as Faith and Dylan Baker as Bob
- Created by: Mike Scully; Julie Thacker
- Starring: Dylan Baker; Kellie Waymire; Lizzy Caplan; David Henrie
- Theme music composer: Terry Adams; Joey Spampinato; Tom Ardolino; Johnny Spampinato
- Composer: Eric Speier
- Country of origin: United States
- Original language: English
- No. of seasons: 1
- No. of episodes: 7

Production
- Running time: 30 minutes
- Production companies: Nothing Can Go Wrong Now Productions; 20th Century Fox Television

Original release
- Network: Fox
- Release: March 30 – April 20, 2003

The Pitts is an American sitcom that aired on Fox between March and April 2003. It is about a family and their bad luck. The show featured absurd, fantastical plots presented within the context of a seemingly normal family sitcom. It was cancelled after two months.

== Cast ==
- Dylan Baker as Bob Pitt, the father of the family
- Kellie Waymire as Liz Pitt, the mother of the family
- Lizzy Caplan as Faith Pitt, the older child of Bob and Liz
- David Henrie as Petey Pitt, the younger child of Bob and Liz

== Production ==
In February 2002, it was reported that Fox had ordered a sitcom pilot from Mike Scully and Julie Thacker called The Pitts revolving around an incredibly unlucky family that face outlandish disasters every week. The following month, Dylan Baker had been cast as one of the series leads. In April of that year, Kellie Waymire was reported to star opposite Baker.

In February 2003, it was reported that Scully had secured a deal with Philip Rosenthal to join the staff of Everybody Loves Raymond, as Scully's contract with 20th Century Fox Television was set to expire. Scully's formal onboarding to the Raymond staff was set to take effect in the event The Pitts was not renewed.

== Episodes ==
No.	Title	Directed by	Written by	Original release date	Prod. code	U.S. viewers (millions)
1	"Pilot"	Lee Shallat Chemel	Mike Scully & Julie Thacker-Scully	March 30, 2003	1AGV79	9.11
Bob hires a babysitter for the kids but does not realize she is the girl he stood up for prom night.
2	"A Bug's Wife"	Lee Shallat Chemel	Mike Scully & Julie Thacker-Scully	April 6, 2003	1AGV01	7.47
Faith gets a Volkswagen bug but it falls in love with her and plans to marry her in Las Vegas.
3	"Squarewolves"	Katy Garretson	Story by : Julie Thacker-Scully; Teleplay by : Alec Sulkin & Wellesley Wild	April 13, 2003	1AGV06	6.65
Bob and Liz become werewolves and wreak havoc in the nighttime.
4	"Dummy & Dummier"	Tom Cherones	Story by : Mike Scully & Julie Thacker-Scully; Teleplay by : Mike Scully	April 20, 2003	1AGV05	3.32
A dummy comes to life and haunts the family.
5	"Miss American Pipe"	Matthew Diamond	Tom Gammill & Max Pross	April 20, 2003	1AGV04	6.73
Faith loses her chances of being in a rock video after a pipe goes through her head.
6	"Ticket to Riot"	Lee Shallat-Chemel	Mike Scully & Julie Thacker-Scully	Unaired	1AGV02	TBD
The Pitts take the wrong bus and are held hostage by escaping prisoners.
7	"Bob's New Heart"	Matthew Diamond	Story by : Mike Scully & Julie Thacker-Scully; Teleplay by : Brian Scully	Unaired	1AGV03	TBD
Bob and Liz are convinced to join a dance club which turns out to be a satanic cult.

== Reception ==
The Pitts had a mostly negative reception from critics.

== Cancellation and failed revival ==
Fox ordered seven episodes of the series; the network cancelled the show after only five episodes aired. The last two episodes that aired on Fox aired on the same night, the first airing at 7:30/6:30 CT and the second airing at its regular timeslot at 9:30/8:30 CT. The final two episodes of the series aired two years later in the U.K.

On October 10, 2007, Fox announced an animated version of the show was in development. Of the main cast, Lizzy Caplan and Dylan Baker signed on to reprise their roles. Kellie Waymire died in 2003 and Allison Janney had been cast in her role. The part of Petey was to be played by Andy Milonakis replacing David Henrie who was already starring in Disney Channel's Wizards of Waverly Place.

On July 24, 2008, it was announced that the animated series had been taken out of production after a pilot had failed to impress Fox executives.
