= In Place of Anger =

- Six Feet Under episode
- Episode no.: Season 2 Episode 6
- Directed by: Michael Engler
- Written by: Christian Taylor
- Cinematography by: Alan Caso
- Editing by: Tanya Swerling
- Original release date: April 7, 2002
- Running time: 55 minutes

Guest appearances
- Patricia Clarkson as Sarah O'Connor; Harriet Sansom Harris as Catherine Collins; Ed O'Ross as Nikolai; Julie White as Mitzi Dalton Huntley; Justina Machado as Vanessa Diaz; Adam Scott as Ben Cooper; Graham Jarvis as Bobo; Aysia Polk as Taylor; Terrell Clayton as Eddie; Steve Ryan as Matthew Collins

Episode chronology
← Previous "The Invisible Woman"	Next → "Back to the Garden"

"In Place of Anger" is the sixth episode of the second season of the American drama television series Six Feet Under. It is the nineteenth overall episode of the series and was written by producer Christian Taylor, and directed by Michael Engler. It originally aired on HBO on April 7, 2002.

The series is set in Los Angeles, and depicts the lives of the Fisher family, who run a funeral home, along with their friends and lovers. It explores the conflicts that arise after the family's patriarch, Nathaniel, dies in a car accident. In the episode, Ruth's sister shows up unannounced, while David and Nate are approached by Kroehner with another big offer.

According to Nielsen Media Research, the episode was seen by an estimated 6.60 million household viewers and gained a Nielsen household rating of 4.1. The episode received highly positive reviews from critics, with Patricia Clarkson receiving high praise for her performance.

== Plot ==
Office workers host a party at a yacht. A man flirts with a woman, when they are interrupted by their co-worker Matthew Collins. Matthew is drunk, and insults them as he laments that their company may face bankruptcy. After they leave, he accidentally drops his bottle overboard. He gets upset, but accidentally falls as well, dying after drowning.

Ruth (Frances Conroy) is surprised when her sister Sarah (Patricia Clarkson) shows up unnanounced at the house. Sarah's carefree personality bothers Ruth, especially when she dismisses her progress at The Plan. She joins the family during dinner, with Ruth also inviting Nikolai (Ed O'Ross) to meet the family. Sarah bonds with Claire (Lauren Ambrose) by suggesting she should embrace her artistic side, while Nate (Peter Krause) and Brenda (Rachel Griffiths) announce their engagement.

When Kroehner takes Matthew's wife as client, David (Michael C. Hall) decides to offer a lower payment for the casket despite knowing they will not recoup their investment. Mitzi Dalton Huntley (Julie White) visits David and Nate, and decides to take them to a trip on her private plane to a resort. There, Mitzi reveals she wants to buy their funeral service again, offering them a large sum of money. David is tempted, but Nate rips the check, feeling that they have a bigger purpose than money. Brenda receives a client into her house, finding that he has an erection. She complies with his desire to masturbate him, but tells him he cannot ever return.

David and Ben (Adam Scott) continue dating. While leaving church, David is approached by Taylor (Aysia Polk), introducing her to Ben as a friend. Keith (Mathew St. Patrick) sees this from afar, but decides not to get involved. David and Ben go to the former's apartment, where Ben proclaims his feelings for him. David finally admits that he loves someone else, prompting a disappointed Ben to break up with him and leave. Ruth finally confronts Sarah for her attitude, reprimanding her for leaving her alone in taking care of the family while she was having fun. Sarah is offended by her remarks, as she feels she has not lived the life she hoped she would have. That night, Ruth shows Claire some of the artwork she made in her childhood, delighting Claire.

== Production ==
=== Development ===
The episode was written by producer Christian Taylor, and directed by Michael Engler. This was Taylor's third writing credit, and Engler's second directing credit.

== Reception ==
=== Viewers ===
In its original American broadcast, "In Place of Anger" was seen by an estimated 6.60 million household viewers with a household rating of 4.1. This means that it was seen by 4.1% of the nation's estimated households, and was watched by 4.33 million households. This was a 22% increase in viewership from the previous episode, which was watched by 5.37 million household viewers with a household rating of 3.3.

=== Critical reviews ===
"In Place of Anger" received highly positive reviews from critics. John Teti of The A.V. Club wrote, "Ben was David's way of distracting himself, and David decides he no longer needs that diversion. None of this is terribly fair to poor Ben, of course, but I have a feeling he’ll end up okay."

Entertainment Weekly gave the episode a "B+" grade, and wrote, "The contrast between free spirit Sarah and uptight Ruth is a touch too pat, but Clarkson's performance is splendid. And Griffiths has a great moment when, after she gratifies her client, her face goes from pleasure to guilt to shock in the space of a split second." Mark Zimmer of Digitally Obsessed gave the episode a perfect 5 out of 5 rating, writing "This is a great episode, full of humor but with some genuinely touching moments. Mitzi is as always a hoot, and Sarah's the sort of person you wish you knew in real life, but probably don't. Contrasted with the poignancy of Sarah's revelations, and more revelations about the man who dies at the beginning of the show, this episode strikes a great balance between comedy and pathos, and gets everything just about right."

TV Tome gave the episode a 7 out of 10 rating and wrote "However the episode does misfire as well, particularly down to the unsatisfying conclusion of David and Ben's relationship." Billie Doux of Doux Reviews gave the episode a 3 out of 4 stars and wrote "I loved Ruth's sister, Sarah. Impulsive, irresponsible, fun, oddly tragic, going about life on her own unusual terms. Ruth and Sarah were so different. On a basic level, the problem with their relationship is that they envy each others' choices. They're also threatened by each others' choices." Television Without Pity gave the episode a "B–" grade.

In 2016, Ross Bonaime of Paste ranked it 38th out of all 63 Six Feet Under episodes and wrote, "With the arrival of Ruth's sister Sarah, “In Place of Anger” gives us a new layer of depth to the Fisher family. Sarah is a wealth of information, bringing out wounds, like how a 15-year-old Nate lost his virginity to one of Sarah's thirty-year-old friends or how Ruth got stuck caring for her family while Sarah had “fun.” But what Sarah truly brings out is the artistic side in Claire — the existence of which, frankly, hadn't been made entirely clear up until this point. There are, however, plenty of plots in this episode that play like the writers are remembering some of these story lines still existed, such as Ruth's relationship with Nikolai and Kroehner still having their sights set on Fisher & Sons."
