= I'll Take You =

- Six Feet Under episode
- Episode no.: Season 2 Episode 12
- Directed by: Michael Engler
- Written by: Joey Soloway
- Cinematography by: Alan Caso
- Editing by: Tanya Swerling
- Original release date: May 19, 2002
- Running time: 56 minutes

Guest appearances
- Lili Taylor as Lisa Kimmel; Jeremy Sisto as Billy Chenowith; Joanna Cassidy as Margaret Chenowith; Robert Foxworth as Bernard Chenowith; Glenn Fitzgerald as Aaron Buchbinder; Richard Jenkins as Nathaniel Fisher; Ed O'Ross as Nikolai; Justina Machado as Vanessa Diaz; Aysia Polk as Taylor; David Norona as Gary Deitman; Efrain Figueroa as Andrew Perez

Episode chronology
← Previous "The Liar and the Whore"	Next → "The Last Time"

"I'll Take You" is the twelfth episode of the second season of the American drama television series Six Feet Under. It is the 25th overall episode of the series and was written by producer Joey Soloway, and directed by Michael Engler. It originally aired on HBO on May 19, 2002.

The series is set in Los Angeles, and depicts the lives of the Fisher family, who run a funeral home, along with their friends and lovers. It explores the conflicts that arise after the family's patriarch, Nathaniel, dies in a car accident. In the episode, Nate learns that Brenda is hiding something from him, while David and Keith try to win over a social worker for Taylor's custody. Meanwhile, Federico's past with Nathaniel is depicted.

According to Nielsen Media Research, the episode was seen by an estimated 4.29 million household viewers and gained a Nielsen household rating of 2.7. The episode received critical acclaim, who praised the fight scene between Nate and Brenda, as well as the focus on Federico. For the episode, Freddy Rodriguez received a nomination for Outstanding Supporting Actor in a Drama Series at the 54th Primetime Emmy Awards.

== Plot ==
At a beauty salon, a barber meets with his usual customers, and argues with one of his co-workers over an old woman, Leticia Perez, who has been visiting every Saturday. When he checks on her, he finds that she died.

David (Michael C. Hall) and Keith (Mathew St. Patrick) prepare for a visit from a social worker, who will determine if Keith is responsible enough to be granted custody of Taylor (Aysia Polk). While Keith hides anything gay for the visit, they find that the social worker is actually gay himself, and they win him over. Ruth (Frances Conroy) tries to fix her relationship with Nikolai (Ed O'Ross), but eventually comes to realize they are not meant for each other. While Nikolai watches Blade II, Ruth breaks up with him, which does not bother him in the slightest.

Claire (Lauren Ambrose) attends an art college, where she bonds with some classmates and finds that some of Billy's artworks have made their way there. She later talks with Billy (Jeremy Sisto), who has been progressing since his time in rehabilitation. Federico (Freddy Rodriguez) is informed of Leticia's death, as she was his neighbor. She and Vanessa (Justina Machado) are further shocked when they find that she left $149,000 to Rico for their good relationship. Federico also reminisces over his beginning at Fisher & Sons, where he established a good relationship with Nathaniel (Richard Jenkins). Keith is cleared from a shooting incident from a few months ago, relieving David, who just found out Kroehner has filed for Chapter 11. However, Keith gets into another problem when he brutally assaults a man who abuses his wife during a welfare check.

Nate (Peter Krause) visits Aaron Buchbinder (Glenn Fitzgerald), a close friend diagnosed with cancer. They talk over Nate's relationships, with Aaron feeling his biggest pain comes when he gets romantically involved. While drinking with Brenda (Rachel Griffiths) in the porch, they are approached by a young man, whom Brenda previously had sex with. Nate recognizes his cap and words as the same from Brenda's manuscript, and confronts her over the content. She finally confesses her sex addiction, leading to a verbal fight over their respective affairs. Nate angrily leaves, dropping his engagement ring, devastating Brenda. Ruth is later called by Lisa (Lili Taylor), who shocks her by revealing that she gave birth to Nate's daughter, Maya, two weeks earlier. While Ruth is stunned upon finding she is grandmother, she later visits Lisa and embraces Maya.

== Production ==
=== Development ===
The episode was written by producer Joey Soloway, and directed by Michael Engler. This was Soloway's second writing credit, and Engler's third directing credit.

== Reception ==
=== Viewers ===
In its original American broadcast, "I'll Take You" was seen by an estimated 4.29 million household viewers with a household rating of 2.7. This means that it was seen by 2.7% of the nation's estimated households, and was watched by 2.89 million households. This was a 26% decrease in viewership from the previous episode, which was watched by 5.79 million household viewers with a household rating of 3.6.

=== Critical reviews ===
"I'll Take You" received critical acclaim. John Teti of The A.V. Club wrote, "“I'll take you” can cut different ways. The act of choosing can be an act of resignation, as Aaron views it, or it could be an act of joy, as Margaret and Bern Chenowith view it in their heartfelt renewal of vows. The choice of another human being comes in many different colors, and this episode explores them."

Entertainment Weekly gave the episode an "A" grade, and wrote, "This episode could have gone over the top, veering as it does between exceptional sweetness (Rico's memories of Nathaniel) and extraordinary bitterness (the Nate-and-Brenda screaming match, which is on a par with Tony and Carmela’s throwdown from The Sopranos' season 4 finale). But both are handled with deftness and precision, and the underused Freddy Rodriguez gets an overdue chance to take center stage." Mark Zimmer of Digitally Obsessed gave the episode a 4 out of 5 rating, writing "Another strong episode, if not quite as good as the previous. It's good to see a little more attention paid to Rico, whose character has been underwritten in most of season two. And there's one particularly amusing bit when Keith and David realize that their preparations for the social worker's visit were all in vain."

TV Tome gave the episode a 9 out of 10 rating and wrote "Absolutely excellent. "I'll Take You" is a perfect lead in to what should be a superb finale and high points are also warranted to Richard Marvin's beautiful score that close the episode. Makes me almost forget the use of Shakira at its beginning." Billie Doux of Doux Reviews gave the episode a perfect 4 out of 4 stars and wrote "Brenda got what she must have subconsciously wanted: her freedom. That break-up scene was a long time coming, and it was vicious and devastating. I don't think Nate and Brenda can come back from "fucking cunt from hell."" Television Without Pity gave the episode an "A" grade.

In 2016, Ross Bonaime of Paste ranked it 26th out of all 63 Six Feet Under episodes and wrote, "“I'll Take You” succeeds with huge character moments, although it all feels incredibly convenient at times. For example, out of nowhere, Kroener files for bankruptcy and after Vanessa loses her job, Rico inherits $149,000. That all worked out well! But “I'll Take You” does give some great backstory about how Rico came to work for Fisher & Sons, and what drew him to such gruesome work. And then there's the big reveal of two huge secrets that make ‘I'll Take You” great. Lisa calls Fisher & Sons, telling Ruth that she is now a grandmother and in one of the series' most well-performed scenes, Nate and Brenda break up over each other's infidelities. It's an incredibly tough scene that's still difficult (no matter how many times you’ve seen it) to watch."

=== Accolades ===
Freddy Rodriguez submitted the episode to support his nomination for Outstanding Supporting Actor in a Drama Series at the 54th Primetime Emmy Awards. He would respectively lose to John Spencer for The West Wing.
