= The Plan (Six Feet Under) =

- Six Feet Under episode
- Nathaniel and Nate Fisher in episode "The Plan"
- Episode no.: Season 2 Episode 3
- Directed by: Rose Troche
- Written by: Kate Robin
- Cinematography by: Alan Caso
- Editing by: Tanya Swerling
- Original air date: March 17, 2002
- Running time: 56 minutes

Episode chronology
← Previous "Out, Out Brief Candle"	Next → "Driving Mr. Mossback"

"The Plan" is the third episode of the second season of the American drama television series Six Feet Under. It is the sixteenth overall episode of the series and was written by Kate Robin, and directed by Rose Troche. It originally aired on HBO on March 17, 2002.

The series is set in Los Angeles, and depicts the lives of the Fisher family, who run a funeral home, along with their friends and lovers. It explores the conflicts that arise after the family's patriarch, Nathaniel, dies in a car accident. In the episode, Ruth enters a self-help seminar to find guidance in her life. The episode features a parody of the program used by est and The Forum.

According to Nielsen Media Research, the episode was seen by an estimated 4.64 million household viewers and gained a Nielsen household rating of 3.0. The episode received positive reviews from critics, who praised the writing and performances.

== Plot summary ==
The episode begins with the death of Michael John Piper, whose wife is a psychic. As he dies, Mrs. Piper states that she can see a light emanating from above his head. Nate begins to experience muscular twitching and loss of verbal skills, which after some internet research David determines to be a condition known as AVM. Later, as Mrs. Piper is selecting a casket for the funeral assisted by David, she informs him that she is being advised by her late husband.

In a scene in the kitchen, Ruth comes downstairs and informs Nate, David and Claire that she will be attending a self-improvement seminar called "The Plan". Her friend Robbie had urged her to attend the course. Claire is worried that "The Plan" is some kind of cult, and Nate remarks that it must be "one of those self-actualization things from the '70s where they yell at you for twelve hours and don't let you go to the bathroom". Upon arrival at the seminar, the leader begins to use jargon and metaphor which compares a "blueprint" for home renovation to self-improvement of one's life. She singles out Ruth and berates her for "tiptoeing around her own house like she's afraid of waking someone up".

Claire attends a counseling session at school, and David brings Nate to the Independent Funeral Directors lunch, where Nate proceeds to rant about the evils of corporations as related to their industry. Claire later returns to the counselor's office, where a police detective questions her about her boyfriend Gabe's involvement in a convenience store robbery, and Claire is angry with her counselor for breaking their trust. Brenda and Nate have a conversation about college-life while she is selecting courses for her adult education, and the conversation leads to Brenda's current lack of interest in sex. Brenda later decides to leave the genetics class she had enrolled in, after getting in a public argument with the instructor.

Ruth comes home late at night from her seminar, and finds Claire waiting for her on the couch. Ruth mentions that she will be attending more seminars of "The Plan" because she has already paid for the coursework and does not want to appear rude. Ruth begins to use jargon from the course in her conversation with Claire, and then Ruth complains that she cannot yet go to sleep for she must first do "homework" from the course. This homework includes writing a letter to her dead mother forgiving her for "all the terrible things she did to me", and writing a letter to herself, describing how she will "renovate" her life. As Nate prepares for the funeral, his father Nathaniel visits him, and they discuss philosophical opinions regarding death and the afterlife. A poem by Walt Whitman is read aloud at the funeral. After the funeral, Claire requests assistance from Nate, but David interrupts them with follow-up news from their Independent Funeral Directors meeting. Keith and his mother have a heated discussion about the care of Taylor, and the neglected responsibilities of his sister Carla. Brenda flirts with a patron at a bar, and he gives her his business card moments before Nate arrives to meet her.

At "The Plan", the seminar leader gives the group a new assignment: to go outside to ready banks of phones, and call their family members to inform them of specifically how they wish to "renovate their homes" together. Robbie goads Ruth into calling a family member, but she fakes a conversation with Claire while listening to an automated message. Later, Gabe calls Claire, and asks her to come meet him. Nate and Brenda have dinner together, where she tells him of her academic experience and he discusses concepts of death with her. In the seminar, the leader asks everyone to close their eyes and imagine that everyone else is laughing at them for being stupid, and then asks the participants if they get the joke. Everyone does, except Ruth, who rants at the course instructor. After her rant, the leader congratulates her for "knocking down her old house", and proceeds to tell her that now she can rebuild a new house. Ruth and Robbie then hang out at a bar where they flirt and Ruth asserts herself in conversation. While driving Gabe, Claire witnesses him shoot at another car while they are stopped, but does not see if he has hit anyone. Claire later grabs Gabe's gun, and leaves him to go home and seek help from David, who calls Keith. Keith questions Claire in a supportive tone, while Nate and David are more concerned and confused. However, Keith explains to them that Claire was conflicted due to her love for Gabe.

== Production ==
=== Development ===
The episode was written by Kate Robin, and directed by Rose Troche. This was Robin's second writing credit, and Troche's first directing credit.

=== Music ===
Sources

- "Opus 29, No. 1, Andante" by Franz Schubert
- "Young Girl" by Roy Kohn
- "Invierno" by Andy Caldwell
- "Somewhere in a Dream" by Joel Evans
- "You Were Right" by Built to Spill
- "Strong Nature" by Meeting Minds
- "Hey Mister" by Custom
- "Man of the Road" by Wayne Hancock

== Analysis ==
Reading Six Feet Under: TV to Die For by Akass et al. compared the episode to Werner Erhard's est and The Forum, as did the Pittsburgh City Paper. Akass cites the episode while analyzing the phenomenon of self-improvement, and notes that: "Repairing her shingles often leaves Ruth in shackles". She writes that: "..the series performs the logic of self-help, both its silly and seductive sides". However, she also points out that Ruth's rant at the end of her seminar is cathartic for Ruth, and she ends her analysis of the episode by asking: "So, what do we make of our times when all this supposed nonsense actually works?"

Donald Kummings cites the episode in his A Companion to Walt Whitman, while analyzing the effect of a poem by Walt Whitman on a grieving family. Walt Whitman had been character Michael John Piper's favorite poet. Kummings notes "The facial expression of the bereaved wife indicates that she is pleased and consoled by these lines". Kummings also makes mention of the psychic theme that runs throughout the episode, noting: "Indeed psychic connection with the dead is an ongoing motif here, since both funeral director brothers communicate with their father during the episode". The episode is also analyzed in Marriner's Finding the Open Road: A Guide to Self-construction Rather Than Mass Production.

== Reception ==
=== Viewers ===
In its original American broadcast, "The Plan" was seen by an estimated 5.68 million household viewers with a household rating of 3.5. This means that it was seen by 3.5% of the nation's estimated households, and was watched by 3.69 million households. This was a 22% increase in viewership from the previous episode, which was watched by 4.64 million household viewers with a household rating of 3.0.

=== Critical reviews ===
"The Plan" received positive reviews from critics. John Teti of The A.V. Club wrote, "This is a breakthrough success for Ruth — a moment in which she doesn't, as Robby had put it, “tiptoe around everyone.” In an episode full of lies that people tell themselves, it's appropriate that Six Feet Under's grandmaster of self-delusion tacks in the opposite direction."

Entertainment Weekly gave the episode a "B–" grade, and wrote, "There's a whole lot of the Claire-and-Gabe saga in this one, and it doesn't quite work: The show is at its best when it plays it close to real life, and this story line smacks a bit too much of gangster-movie melodrama." Mark Zimmer of Digitally Obsessed gave the episode a 4 out of 5 rating, writing "The single funniest scene in the entire episode is Ruth's expletive-laden rant as she tells everyone at a Plan meeting to go to hell, but with unexpected results."

TV Tome gave the episode a 9 out of 10 rating and wrote "All in all, I'm impressed. This episode had some truly genius moments." Billie Doux of Doux Reviews gave the episode a 3 out of 4 stars and wrote "The usual good SFU episode." Television Without Pity gave the episode an "A" grade.

In 2016, Ross Bonaime of Paste ranked it 61st out of all 63 Six Feet Under episodes and wrote, "“The Plan” continues with Six Feet Under's second season meandering, as characters continue to try and figure out where their lives should take them next. Ruth is still heading down the self-actualization route and rebels against it, which only results in taking her deeper in, while Brenda tries out a college class before quitting on the first day. Both believe they're fighting against what is holding them back, but really it all just keeps them in the same ruts they were already in. But “The Plan” also incrementally moves our casts relationships along, as Brenda and Nate have quit having sex, David and Keith get slightly closer and Claire goes to the cops about Gabe."

== See also ==
- Est and The Forum in popular culture
- Large Group Awareness Training
