= Cathartic =

Substance which accelerates defecation

In medicine, a cathartic is a substance that accelerates defecation. This is similar to a laxative, which is a substance that eases defecation, usually by softening feces. It is possible for a substance to be both a laxative and a cathartic. However, agents such as psyllium seed husks increase the bulk of the feces.

Cathartics such as sorbitol, magnesium citrate, magnesium sulfate, or sodium sulfate were previously used as a form of gastrointestinal decontamination following poisoning via ingestion. They are no longer routinely recommended for poisonings. High-dose cathartics may be an effective means of ridding the lower gastrointestinal tract of toxins; however, they carry a risk of electrolyte imbalances and dehydration. Catharsis can be an effect of pesticide poisonings, such as with elemental sulfur.
