= Kellie Waymire =

U.S. actress (1967–2003)

- Born: Kellie Suzanne Waymire; July 27, 1967; Columbus, Ohio, U.S.
- Died: November 13, 2003 (aged 36); Los Angeles, California, U.S.
- Education: Southern Methodist University (BFA); University of California, San Diego (MFA)
- Occupation: Actress
- Years active: 1993–2003
- Partner: Gary Judson Smoot

Kellie Suzanne Waymire (July 27, 1967 – November 13, 2003) was an American stage, television, and film actress. She was known for her television roles on Six Feet Under, Friends, and Star Trek: Enterprise.

== Early life and education ==
Waymire was born in Columbus, Ohio to Jack and Vickie Waymire. She had two siblings. The family moved frequently, living in Lake Tahoe, Nevada; Denver, Colorado; Tampa, Florida; and Houston, Texas. In Houston, Waymire attended Lamar High School where she became interested in acting and was the drama club's president. She then attended Southern Methodist University (SMU) where she won the Greer Garson Award.

Waymire completed a Bachelor of Fine Arts in Theater at SMU, and earned a Master of Fine Arts from the University of California, San Diego in 1993.

== Career ==
After graduating from college, Waymire moved to New York City. She began her television career in the role of Emily Haynes on the soap opera One Life to Live in 1993.

In 1997, she moved to Los Angeles and continued her career in a number of primetime television shows, including The Practice, Judging Amy, The X-Files, Wolf Lake, CSI: Crime Scene Investigation, NYPD Blue, and Yes Dear.

Waymire was predominantly cast in offbeat or humorous roles. Two of her highest-profile roles were recurring ones on Six Feet Under, where she played Melissa, a prostitute; and on Star Trek: Enterprise, as Crewman Elizabeth Cutler. She had previously portrayed the role of Layna in Star Trek: Voyager in the episode "Muse". She guest-starred in the Season 9 Seinfeld episode "The Blood", as a sickly mother who wants someone to take care of her son in the event of her death.

In 2003, Waymire was cast as a regular in the short-lived Fox sitcom The Pitts. It was canceled after four weeks. Among her final onscreen roles were guest spots on Friends (in the episode "The One Where Ross Is Fine", aired a month before her death), Everwood, and Wonderfalls, the last two of which aired after her death. The former Everwood was dedicated to her memory. She appeared in a number of feature films, including a role as Jane in the comedy-drama Playing by Heart (1998).

In addition to her film and television work, Waymire was active in regional theater around the United States. She played the lead in A.R. Gurney's play Sylvia at San Diego's Old Globe Theatre in 1996. She appeared in a revival of the Noël Coward play Present Laughter at the Pasadena Playhouse in 1998, and in many other stage productions across the country. At the time of her death, she was starring as Anne in the stage adaptation of Kate Crackernuts at the 24th Street Theatre in Los Angeles.

== Death ==
On November 13, 2003, Waymire died in her home in Venice, Los Angeles, California of cardiac arrest caused by an undiagnosed cardiac arrhythmia, likely related to mitral valve prolapse, a condition with which she had been diagnosed as a teenager. Her funeral was held on November 23, 2003, in West Milton, Ohio.

On December 8, 2003, a public memorial was held at the Ralph Freud Playhouse, housed in Macgowan Hall at UCLA.

The Kellie Waymire Scholarship Fund, through the UC San Diego Foundation, was established in her honor.

== Filmography ==
=== Film ===
Year	Title	Role	Notes
1998	Playing by Heart	Jane	
1998	Dig a Hole, Find a Finger		
1999	Buddy Boy	Ireland	
2000	Sunset Strip	Mary	
2000	Screenland Drive	Nina	
2001	Maniacts	Beth Windsor	
2003	The Vest	Mom	Short
2003	Something More	Mrs. Avery	Short

=== Television ===
Year	Title	Role	Notes
1993-1994	One Life to Live	Emily Haynes	Recurring
1997	When the Cradle Falls	Lucy Becknell	TV movie
1997	Seinfeld	Vivian	Episode: "The Blood"
1997	Cracker	Toby's Pick-up Victim	Episode: "Sons and Lovers"
1998	Ally McBeal	Chrissa	Episode: "Worlds Without Love"
1998	The Practice	Dr. Marshall	Episode: "One of Those Days"
1998	Maggie	Jenny	Episode: "Every Little Star"
1998	Nothing Sacred	Cecil	Episode: "Holy Words"
1999	Stark Raving Mad	Tess	Episode: "The Man Who Knew Too Much"
1999	Snoops	Diana Keppler	Episode: "Constitutions"
2000	Cover Me	Mrs. Krost	Episode: "Domestic Terrorism"
2000	Then Came You	Denise	Episode: "Then Came a Wedding"
2000	Star Trek: Voyager	Lanya	Episode: "Muse"
2000	M.Y.O.B.	Mary Beth Farber	Episode: "Boys in the Band"
2000	Strong Medicine	Angela	Episode: "Misconceptions"
2000	Popular	Penelope Poppins	Episode: "Baby, Don't Do It!"
2000	Freedom	Maggie Ford	Episode: "The Chase"
2000	The Fugitive	Deputy Dixmont	Episode: "Miles to Go"
2001	The X-Files	Tammi Peyton	Episode: "Surekill"
2001	Judging Amy	Vickie Spencer	Episode: "The Claw Is Our Master"
2001	Kate Brasher	Nell Macrae	Episode: "Simon"
2001	CSI: Crime Scene Investigation	Carla Dantini	Episode: "Justice Is Served"
2001	Yes, Dear	Rosanna	Episode: "No Room to Spare"
2001–2002	Wolf Lake	Miranda Devereaux	5 episodes
2001–2002	Star Trek: Enterprise	Crewman Elizabeth Cutler	Episodes: "Strange New World", "Dear Doctor", "Two Days and Two Nights"
2002	Six Feet Under	Melissa	Recurring role (season 2)
2003	The Pitts	Liz Pitt	Main role
2003	NYPD Blue	Candace Hewitt	Episode: "Meet the Grandparents"
2003	Friends	Colleen	Episode: "The One Where Ross Is Fine"
2003	Less Than Perfect	Party Guest	Uncredited, Episode: "Picture Perfect Party"
2004	Everwood	Helen McGinns	Episode: "Family Dynamics"
2004	Wonderfalls	Penelope	Episode: "Safety Canary", (final appearance)
