= Aysia Polk =

American child actress

- Born: August 10, 1990 (age 35)
- Occupation: child actress
- Years active: 1997–2005
- Notable work: Angela Walker on American Dreams, Taylor on Six Feet Under

Aysia Polk (born August 10, 1990) is an American child actress active from 1997 until 2005.

== Background ==
Polk had a recurring role on American Dreams playing Angela Walker from 2002–2005, and on Six Feet Under playing Taylor from 2002–2003.

She appeared in the movie Biker Boyz and had guest-starring roles on shows such as Moesha, The Hughleys and The Parkers.

She has also appeared in JAG, ER and Touched by an Angel.
