= Willing =

Willing may refer to:

- pertaining to Will (disambiguation)
  - assigning items through a will and testament
  - assenting through Volition (psychology)

== Places ==
- Willing, New York, a town in Allegany County
- Mount Willing (disambiguation)
- Willing Lake, a lake in Rice County, Minnesota, United States

== People with the surname ==
- Ann Willing Bingham (1764–1801) born Anne Willing, American socialite
- Ava Lowle Willing, American socialite
- Charles Willing (1710–1754), English-American colonial merchant
- Elizabeth Willing Powel (1743–1830), born Elizabeth Willing, American socialite
- Foy Willing (1914–1978), American singer-songwriter
- George M. Willing (1829–1874), American physician
- James Willing, representative of the Continental Congress
- Jennie Fowler Willing (1834–1916), Canadian-American educator, author, preacher, social reformer, suffragist
- John Rhea Barton Willing (1864–1913), American socialite and violin collector
- Martina Willing, German paralympian
- Mary Willing Byrd (1740–1814) born Mary Willing, American colonial socialite
- Mary Willing Clymer (1774–1852) born Mary Willing, American socialite
- Nick Willing, British director
- Oscar Willing (1889–1962), American golfer
- Thomas Willing (1731–1821), American financier
- Victor Willing (1928–1988), British painter
- Georg Franz-Willing (1915–2008), German historian
- Charles Willing Byrd (1770–1828), American politician
- G. Willing Pepper (1909–2001), American businessman

== Other uses ==
- Willing Expedition, a 1778 military expedition
- Hilda M. Willing (skipjack)
- "Willing", a song by Times of Grace from The Hymn of a Broken Man

== See also ==
- Will (disambiguation)
