= Maria Matilda Bingham =

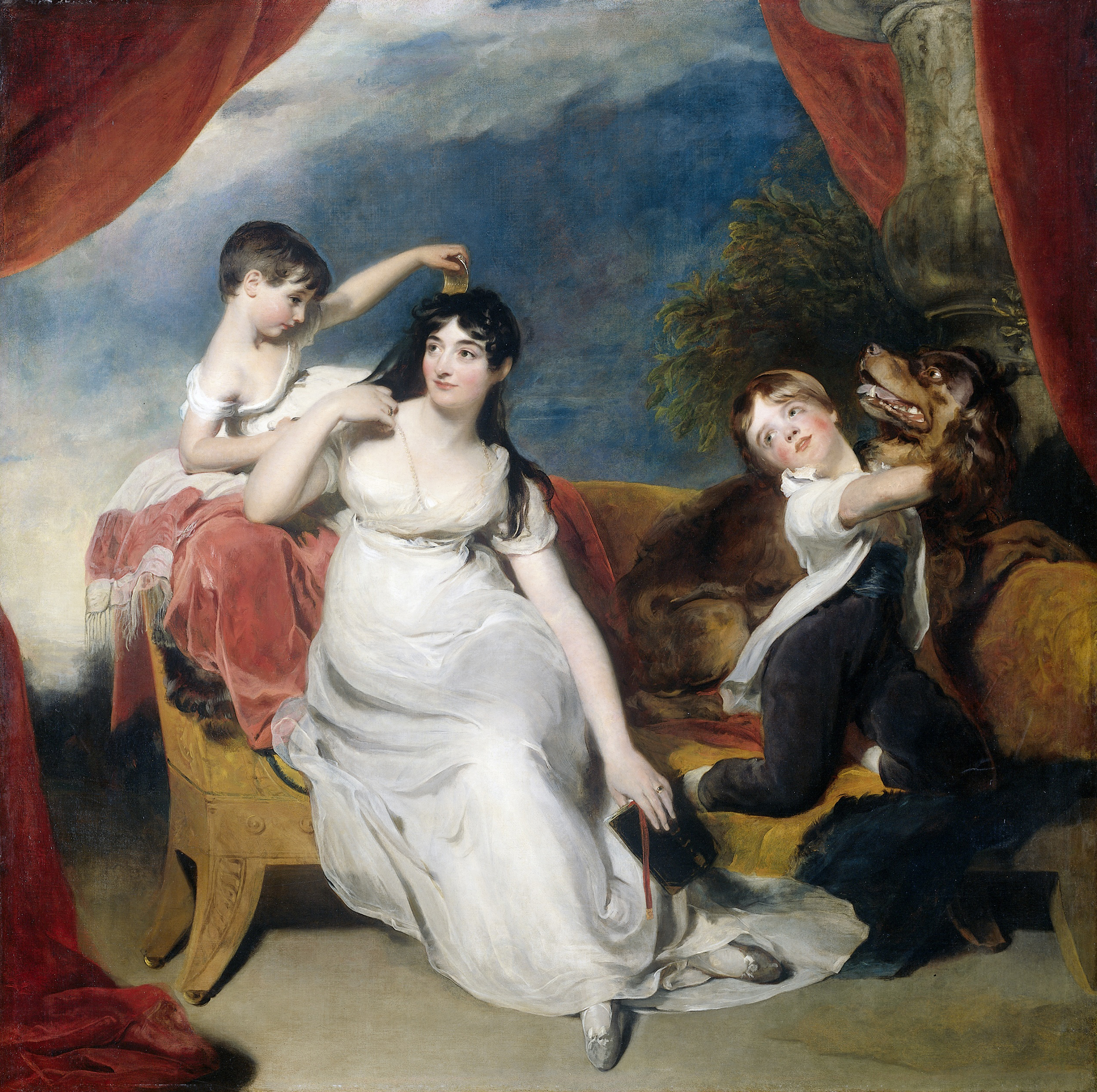
Maria Mathilda Bingham with Two of her Children, by Thomas Lawrence, c. 1810–1818, at the Rijksmuseum.

Maria Matilda, Marquise du Blaisel (née Maria Matilda Bingham; 1783–1849) was an American born heiress who married several prominent European aristocrats and statesmen.

== Early life ==
Maria was born in Binghamton, New York, in 1783. She was the second daughter of William Bingham and Ann Willing Bingham. Her elder sister, Ann Louisa Bingham, in 1798 became the wife of Alexander Baring, later the first Baron Ashburton. Her younger brother, William Bingham, was married to Marie-Charlotte Chartier de Lotbiniere, seigneuresse de Rigaud, the second daughter and co-heiress of Michel-Eustache-Gaspard-Alain Chartier de Lotbinière.

Following her birth, her father was a delegate to the Continental Congress for Pennsylvania from 1786 to 1788. He later served as a U.S. Senator and President pro tempore of the U.S. Senate in 1797. Bingham helped broker the Louisiana Purchase in 1803 and was one of the richest men in America, having made his fortune during the American Revolution through trading and ownership of privateers. After her father's death in 1804, Maria and her sister both stayed in England.

Her maternal grandfather was Thomas Willing, who served as president of the First Bank of the United States.

== Personal life ==
Maria married three times. On April 11, 1799, at the age of 15, she became the Comtesse de Tilly upon her elopement and secret marriage to French aristocrat, Jacques-Pierre-Alexandre, Comte de Tilly (1761–1816), in Philadelphia. After the marriage's quick end, Tilly "demanded an annual pension as his price to leave the country," and wrote to Maria "insisting he would have the rights to her inheritance upon the death of her wealthy parents." He was paid £5,000 and an annual pension of £500, and, in March 1800, "the Philadelphia newspapers announced that the Pennsylvania state legislature had passed an act declaring null and voide the marriage of Maria Matilda and Alexandre de Tilly." After their brief marriage, he returned to Europe, where the King of Prussia named him his chamberlain in 1801. According to Tilly, her mother, who died shortly after the episode, was a lover of Louis-Marie, vicomte de Noailles (the brother-in-law of the Marquis de Lafayette), who had introduced Tilly to Maria and was her father's business partner.

On 19 April 1802, she married her sister's brother-in-law, Henry Baring (1777–1848) in England. Henry, a son of Harriet (née Herring) Baring and Francis Baring, 1st Baronet, served as a Member of Parliament for Colchester and Bossiney during their marriage. Before their 1824 divorce, Maria and Henry were the parents of five children, three sons and two daughters, including:

- Anna Maria Baring (b. 1803), who married William Gordon Coesvelt.
- Henry Bingham Baring (1804–1869), a Member of Parliament for the rotten borough of Callington in Cornwall. He later represented the Marlborough constituency in Wiltshire. He married Lady Augusta Brudenell, a daughter of Robert Brudenell, 6th Earl of Cardigan, in 1827.
- James Drummond Baring (1806–1901)
- Frances Emily Baring (1813–1886), who married Henry Bridgeman Simpson in 1830.
- William Frederick Baring (1822–1903), who married Emily Jenkins, daughter of Sir Richard Jenkins (chairman of the East India Company), in 1845.

After their divorce, her husband remarried to Cecilia Anne Windham, a daughter of Vice-Admiral William Lukin Windham, with whom he had another eight children.

On April 17, 1826, at the Chapel of the British Ambassador in Paris, Maria married Auguste, Marquis du Blaisel (1790–1870), thereby becoming the Marquise du Blaisel. Her husband, a Chamberlain to the Emperor of Austria, was a son of Camille Joseph du Blaisel and his wife née Baroness Anne Elisabeth de Tornaco.

Maria died in England in 1849. After her death, her widower remarried to Zoé de Digoine du Palais, a daughter of Chevalier Léopold de Digoine.

=== Descendants ===
Through her son Henry, she was a grandmother of Lieutenant-General Charles Baring, the father of Sir Godfrey Baring, 1st Baronet, a Liberal Member of Parliament for the Isle of Wight and later Barnstaple.

Through her eldest daughter Anna Maria, she was a grandmother of Anna Maria Helena Coesvelt, who married Charles-Antonin, Count de Noailles, second son of Antoine-Claude-Just de Noailles, duc de Mouchy and prince-duc de Poix. Best known by this married title as Helena, comtesse de Noailles, she used her wealth and influence to improve the lot of women, financing the English Woman's Journal of the Langham Place Circle.
