= Gerardus Wynkoop II =

American politician

Gerrardus Wynkoop

35th Speaker of the Pennsylvania House of Representatives
- In office 1786–1787
- In office 1793–1793
- Preceded by: William Bingham
- Succeeded by: George Latimer

Personal details
- Born: September 30, 1732 Northampton Township, Bucks County, Pennsylvania
- Died: June 28, 1812 (aged 79) Northampton Township, Bucks County, Pennsylvania
- Spouse: Elizabeth Bennet (1758-?)

Gerrardus Wynkoop (September 30, 1732 – June 18, 1812) was a member of the Pennsylvania House of Representatives from Bucks County and served as speaker of the House in 1793.

== State Assembly prior to 1790 ==
=== Votes ===
- November 23, 1778 – due to a disputed election in Chester County, whether persons, other than those with an exception by law, who took the oath of allegiance between June 1, 1778, and the last election should be entitled to a vote: nay (17 yea, 31 nay)
- Before October 7, 1786 – creating a committee to draft a bill that would allow the Receiver General of the Land Office to obtain back payments and interest for land purchased before July 4, 1776: nay (25 yea, 32 nay)
- December 28, 1786 – reviving the charter of the Bank of North America: yea (32 yea, 28 nay)
- December 28, 1786 – clause to place restrictions on the Bank of North America: nay (28 yea, 33 nay)
- March 6, 1787 – moving the state capital to Harrisburg: nay (33 yea, 19 nay)
- March 28, 1788 – act to amend or explain portions of an act to gradually abolish slavery (the March 28 act was favorable to abolition): yea (40 yea, 16 nay)
- February 19, 1789 – for a committee to create a bill to restore the property of the college/academy/free school of Philadelphia to its trustees: yea (46 yea, 18 nay)

=== Elections (Bucks County) ===
Wynkoop won elections as a representative to the Assembly in the following years. Names listed with him are the others from Bucks County who won. (Note: The spelling of the last name of the politician whose first name is Valentine is listed exactly as it is referenced in the original sources. The correct spelling is unknown.)

- 1779 (along with Benjamin Fell, William Scott, Arthur Watts, Joseph Savage)
- 1781 (along with James Wilkinson, Thomas Long, James Tate, Charles Kachline)
- 1786 – 975 votes (along with Samuel Foulke – 979, John Chapman – 993, Valentine Opp – 937)
- 1787 (along with John Chapman, Valentine Opp, Samuel Foulk)
- 1788 (along with John Chapman, Valentine Opp, Samuel Foulk)
- 1789 (along with John Chapman, Valentine Opp, James Bryan)

=== Speaker ===
On December 22, 1786, at the resignation of Thomas Mifflin as speaker of the Assembly, Wynkoop was elected speaker. He received forty-five votes and was escorted to the chair by Daniel Clymer. The oath was administered by a Mr. Evans. By December 26, 1786, around noon, Wynkoop resigned as speaker and Mifflin was re-elected.

=== Dissolving the Assembly ===
Before the Pennsylvania Constitution was adopted in 1790, the state had a unicameral legislature. Wynkoop was a member of that legislature. On Saturday, September 4, 1790, the Assembly made an address to the people of the state of Pennsylvania, indicating the body was resigning from power due to concerns that their authority had ceased at the adoption of the new state Constitution. The speaker of the Assembly, Richard Peters, declined to be seated. Wynkoop was instead seated in the speaker's chair for this address.

=== Miscellaneous notes ===
Wynkoop, along with Jacob Hiltheimer, escorted Richard Peters to the speaker's chair after his election. Peters was the final speaker of the unicameral general assembly.

According to Wynkoop's obituary, he served nineteen years in the Assembly. It also notes that he served as speaker for several of those years. However, he was elected Bucks County Assessor in 1771 and 1773, which puts this claim in dispute. It could be correct if the writer meant to include both the State Assembly and the House of Representatives (Wynkoop lost the election in 1794), assuming Wynkoop won his first election to the Assembly in 1775.

== Pennsylvania House of Representatives ==
=== Elections (Bucks County) ===
- 1790 – 1,652 votes (along with John Chapman – 1651, James Bryan – 1636, Ralph Stover – 1593)
- 1791 (along with John Chapman, James Bryan, Ralph Stover)
- 1792 (had to be elected in order to be elected speaker, but election returns not found)
- 1793 (along with John Chapman, Joseph Erwin, Ralph Stover)
- 1794 – came in fifth place with 537 votes, losing the election (top four chosen)

=== Speaker ===
Wynkoop served as Speaker of the Pennsylvania House of Representatives in 1793.

== Other political offices/positions ==
=== Assessor for Bucks County ===
- 1771
- 1773

=== Presidential Elector ===
- Election of 1792

Wynkoop chaired a meeting on September 20, 1792, in Lancaster to select candidates for Congressional seats and Presidential electors. The list of electors does not include his name. However, an article dated August 27, 1792, does list his name as a Presidential elector.

== Miscellaneous notes ==
According to Wynkoop's obituary, he showed great care for widows and orphans. He was in the communion of the Dutch Reformed Church for over forty years.
