= The Will =

The Will may refer to:

== Film ==
- The Will (1921 film), a British silent drama film
- The Will (1939 film), an Egyptian film
- The Will (2020 film), an American romance film

== Literature ==
- The Will (1905 book), a book by Mirza Ghulam Ahmad
- The Will, a 2000 novel by Reed Arvin

== Newspapers ==
- The Will (newspaper), a Nigerian newspaper

== Television ==
- The Will (TV series), a 2005 American reality series
- "The Will" (Dynasty 1982), an episode
- "The Will" (Dynasty 1985), an episode
- "The Will" (Six Feet Under), an episode

== See also ==
- Will (disambiguation)
