= Will (given name) =

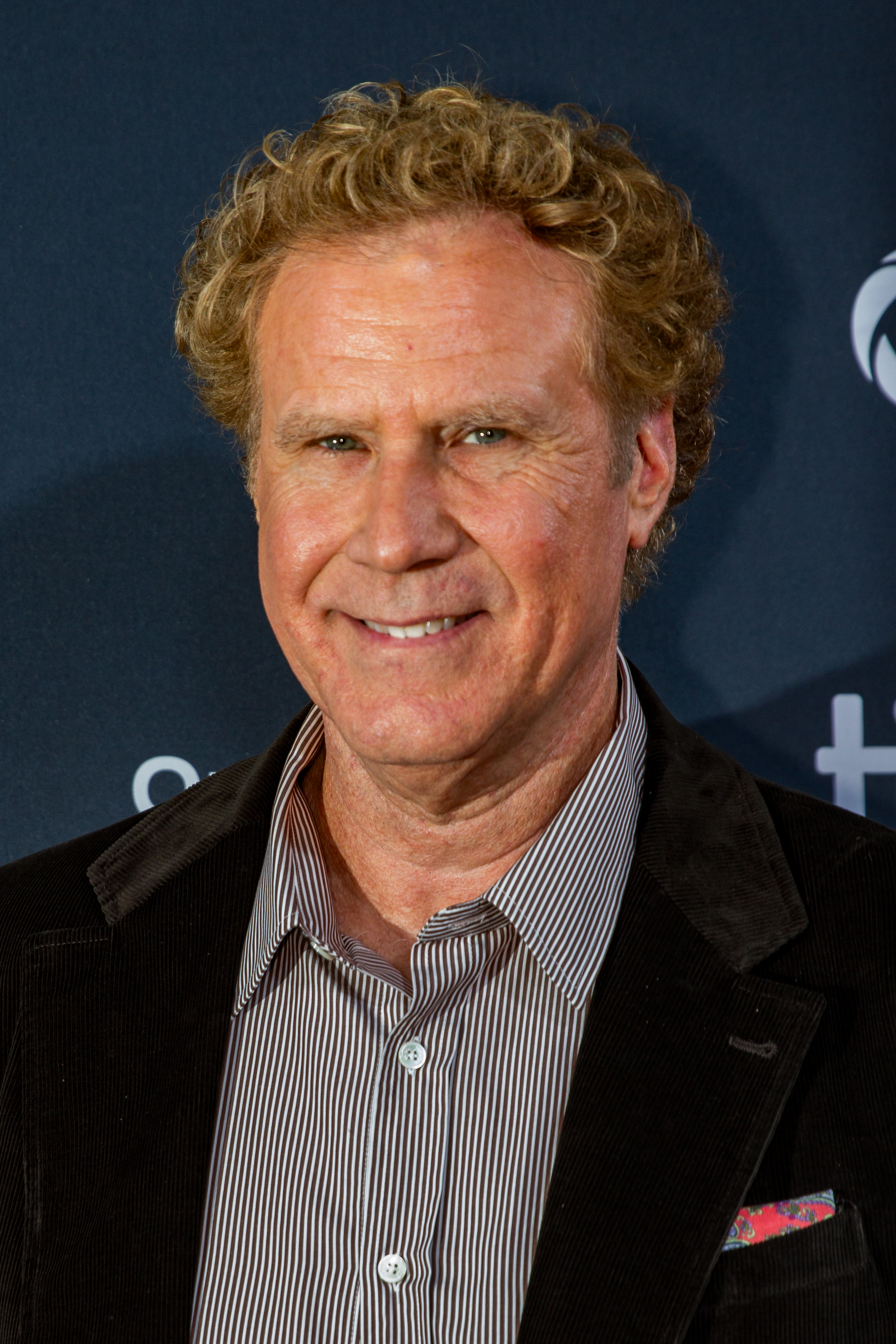
- Will Ferrell in 2024
- Pronunciation: /wɪl/
- Gender: Male

Other names
- Related names: William, Willow, Willard, Wilfred, Wilbert

Will or Wil is a given name, often a short form (hypocorism) of William, Wilson, Wilfred, and other names beginning with Wil-.

Notable people with the name include:

== Men ==
- Will Accooe (1874–1904), American musician and composer
- Will Hill Acker (1899–1951), American football player and coach
- Will Acton (born 1987), American-Canadian ice hockey player
- Will Adam, Anglican archdeacon
- Will Adamsdale (born 1974), English actor
- Will Addison (born 1992), Ireland international rugby union footballer
- Will Adkin (born 1990), English cricketer
- Will Ahern (1896–1983), American vaudeville entertainer
- Will Ahmed, American entrepreneur
- Will Aimson (born 1995), English footballer
- Will Ainsworth (born 1981), American politician
- Will Aitken (born 1949), American-Canadian writer
- Will Albright, American racecar driver
- Will Alexander (poet) (born 1948), American poet
- Will W. Alexander (1884–1956), First president of Dillard University
- Will Allen (cornerback) (born 1978), American football player
- Will Allen (safety) (born 1982), American football player
- Will Allen (urban farmer) (born 1949), American basketball player and urban farmer
- Will Allison (born 1968), American novelist and editor
- Will Allman (born 1997), English rugby union player
- Will Alsop (1947–2018), British architect
- Will Alstergren (born 1962), Australian jurist
- Will Alves (born 2005), English footballer
- Will Amos (born 1974), Canadian politician and lawyer
- Will Anderson (animator), Scottish-born film animator
- Will Anderson (fullback) (1897–1982), American football player
- Will Anderson (Scrabble player) (born 1984), American Scrabble player
- Will Anderson (singer) (born 1986), American singer-songwriter
- Will Anderson Jr. (born 2001), American football player
- Will Annan (born 1996), Scottish footballer
- Will Antwi (born 1982), British-born Ghanaian footballer
- Will Appleton (1889–1958), New Zealand mayor, and rugby league administrator
- Will Appleyard (born 1999), English association football player
- Will Arbery, 21st-century American playwright
- Will Arnett (born 1970), Canadian actor
- Will Arnott (1999–2024), British boccia player
- Will Aronson (born 1981), Musical artist
- Will Artino (born 1992), Taiwanese-American basketball player
- Will Ashcroft (born 2004), Australian rules footballer
- Will Ashley (actor) (born 2002), Filipino actor
- Will Ashon (born 1969), Musical artist
- Will Ashton (1881–1963), Australian artist
- Will Atkinson (born 1988), English footballer
- Will Atkinson (musician) (1908–2003), English musician
- Will Attenborough (born 1991), English actor and climate campaigner
- Will Avery (basketball) (born 1979), American basketball player
- Will Bagley (1950–2021), American historian
- Will Barclay (born 1969), American politician
- Will Barnet (1911–2012), American artist
- Will Biederman, American engineer
- Will Black (born 2006), Canadian American football player
- Wil Boessen (born 1964), Dutch football manager and former player
- Will Brownsberger (born 1957), American politician
- Will Burkart, American comedian
- Will Bynum (born 1983), American basketball player
- Wil Calhoun, American television producer and writer
- Will Chase (born 1970), American actor and singer
- Will Clapp (born 1995), American football player
- Will Clark (born 1964), American baseball player
- Will Clyburn (born 1990), American professional basketball player
- Wil Cordero (born 1971), Puerto Rican baseball player
- Will Craig (born 1994), American baseball player
- Will Dissly (born 1996), American football player
- Will Durant (1885–1981), American writer and historian
- Will Durst (born 1952), American humorist
- Will Echoles (born 2006), American football player
- Will Eisner (1917–2005), American cartoonist
- Will Eno (born 1965), American playwright
- Will Estes (born 1978), American actor
- Will Ferrell (born 1967), American actor
- Will Finn (born 1958), American animator
- Will Flemming (born 1979), American sportscaster
- Will Fries (born 1998), American football player
- Will Forte (born 1970), American actor, comedian, screenwriter, and producer
- Will Fuller (born 1994), American football player
- Will Geer (1902–1978), American actor and social activist
- Will Graham (evangelist) (born 1975), American evangelist
- Will Grier (born 1995), American football player
- Will Grigg (born 1991), English footballer
- Will Hall (American football) (born 1980), American football coach
- Will Hall (writer) (born 1966), American mental health advocate, writer, and counselor
- Will Harris (American football) (born 1997), American football player
- Will Hastings (born 1996), American football player
- Will Hay (1888–1949), English comedian
- Will H. Hays (1879–1954), American politician
- Will Heard (born 1991), English singer-songwriter
- Will Heldt (born 2005), American football player
- Will Hernandez (born 1995), American football player
- Will Hill (born 1990), American football player
- Will Holden (American football) (born 1993), American football player
- Will Holland (born 1998), American baseball player
- Will Hutchins (1930–2025), American actor
- Wil S. Hylton, American journalist
- Will Inman (poet) (1923–2009), American poet
- Will Johnson (disambiguation), multiple people
- Wil Jones (basketball, born 1947), American basketball player
- Will Kacmarek (born 2003), American football player
- Will Keith Kellogg (1860–1951), American businessman
- Will Kemp (actor, born 1977), English actor and dancer
- Will Kimbrough (born 1964), American singer-songwriter
- Will Klein (baseball) (born 1999), American baseball player
- Will Larue, Canadian racing driver
- Will Lee (disambiguation), multiple people
- Will Levis (born 1999), American football player
- Wil London (born 1997), American sprinter
- Wil Lutz (born 1994), American football player
- Will Lyman (born 1948), American voice actor
- Will Mallory (born 1999), American football player
- Will Mastin (1878–1975), American entertainer
- Wil McCarthy (born 1966), American science fiction novelist
- Will McClay (born 1966), American football player and coach
- Will McDonald IV (born 1999), American football player
- Will Murray (1953–2026), American author and scholar of pulp fiction
- Will Muschamp (born 1971), American football head coach
- Wil Myers (born 1990), American baseball player
- Wil Nieves (born 1977), Puerto Rican baseball player
- Will Nightingale (born 1995), English footballer
- Will Ospreay (born 1993), English professional wrestler
- Will Overstreet (born 1979), American football player
- Will Patton (born 1954), American actor
- Will Pauling (born 2003), American football player
- Will Poulter (born 1993), English actor
- Will Perdue (born 1965), American basketball player
- Will Putnam (born 2000), American football player
- Will Quadflieg (1914–2003), German actor
- Will Quince (born 1982), British politician
- Will J. Quinlan (1877–1963), American artist
- Will Quintrell (1880–1946), Musical artist
- Will Rayman (born 1997), American-Israeli basketball player
- Will Reichard (born 2001), American football player
- Will Richard (born 2002), American basketball player
- Will Riley (born 2006), Canadian basketball player
- Wil Robinson (born 1949), American basketball player
- Will Rogers (1879–1935), American humorist
- Will Rogers (American football) (born 2001), American football player
- Will Ryan (1949–2021), American voice actor
- Will Sampson (1933–1987), American actor and painter
- Will Sasso (born 1975), Canadian actor
- Will Sheehey (born 1992), American basketball player and coach
- Will Sheppard (born 2002), American football player
- Will Shipley (born 2002), American football player
- Will Shortz (born 1952), American puzzle creator
- Wil Shriner (born 1953), American actor
- Will Smith (born 1968), American actor and rapper
- Will Solomon (born 1978), American basketball player
- Will Sommers (died 1560), the best-known court jester of King Henry VIII
- Will Streets (1886–1916), English soldier and poet of the First World War
- Will Sutton (born 1991), American football player
- Will Tschetter (born 2003), American basketball player
- Will Tilston (born 2007), British actor
- Wil Trapp (born 1993), American soccer player
- Wil Traval (born 1980), Australian actor
- Wil van der Aalst (born 1966), Dutch computer scientist, and professor
- Will Vinton (1947–2018), American filmmaker
- Wil Waluchow (born 1953), Canadian philosopher
- Will Weaver (basketball) (born c. 1984), American basketball coach
- Wil Wheaton (born 1972), American actor
- Will Whitehorn (born 1960), British business executive
- Will Wade (born 1982), American basketball coach
- Will Wade (Georgia politician) (born 1978), American politician
- Will Wagner (American football), American football player and coach
- Will Wagner (baseball) (born 1998), American baseball player
- Will Wagstaff (born 1960), British ornithologist and naturalist
- Will Walker (Australian footballer) (born 1999), Australian rules footballer
- Will Wallace (born 1901), American film director and actor
- Will Walling (1872–1932), American actor
- Will Wampler (born 1991), American politician
- Will Wand (born 2001), English rugby union player
- Will Waring (born 1950), Camera operator and director
- Will Warren (born 1999), American baseball player
- Will Weatherford (born 1979), American politician
- Will Weaver (born 1950), American writer
- Will Weaver (basketball) (born 1984), American basketball coach
- Will Welch (born 1990), English rugby union player
- Will Welch (editor) (born 1981), American magazine editor
- Will Weng (1907–1993), American crossword puzzle constructor
- Will Wesson (born 1986), American freestyle skier
- Will Wheatley (1786–1848), British jockey
- Will Wheaton (born 1972), American singer-songwriter
- Will Wheeler (born 1974), American politician
- Will White (1854–1911), American baseball player and manager
- Will White (American football), American college football player
- Will White (Australian footballer) (born 2004), Australian rules footballer
- Will Whitehorn (born 1960), British business executive
- Will Whitticker (born 1982), American football player
- Will Wight (born 1989), American writer
- Will Wikle (born 1978), Big Brother US contestant and pornographic actor
- Will Wilcox (born 1986), American professional golfer
- Will Williams (born 1992), New Zealand cricketer
- Will Williams (long jumper) (born 1995), American long jumper
- Will Wilson (artist) (born 1957), American artist
- Will Wilson (baseball) (born 1998), American baseball player
- Will Wilson (photographer) (born 1969), Native American photographer
- Will Wilson (rugby union) (born 1997), English rugby union player
- Will Wilson (Texas politician) (1912–2005), American judge
- Will Windham, American football player and coach
- Will Witherspoon (born 1980), American football player
- Will Witty (born 1995), English rugby union footballer
- Will Wolford (born 1964), American football player
- Will Wood (born 1993), American musician, singer-songwriter and comedian
- Will Wood (footballer) (born 1996), English footballer
- Will Wooten, American prosecutor
- Will Worth, American football player
- Will Wright (actor) (1891–1962), American character actor
- Will Wright (cyclist) (born 1973), Welsh cyclist
- Will Wright (footballer, born 1997) (born 1997), English footballer
- Will Wright (footballer, born 2008) (born 2008), English footballer
- Will Wright (game designer) (born 1960), American video game designer
- Will Wyatt (born 1942), British television executive
- Will Wynn (born 1961), American businessman and politician
- Will Wynn (American football) (1949–2013), American football player
- Will Yeatman (born 1988), American football player
- Will Yeguete (born 1991), French basketball player
- Will Yip (born 2000), American producer, songwriter, and musician
- Will Youmans (born 1978), American writer and activist
- Will Young (born 1979), British singer and actor
- Will Young (cricketer) (born 1992), New Zealand cricketer
- Will Z., Belgian musician
- Will Zalatoris (born 1996), American professional golfer
- Will Zang, Chinese filmmaker
- Will Zellers (born 2006), American ice hockey player
- Will Zens (1920–2013), American film director
- Will Znidaric, American film and television editor and producer

== Women ==
- Wil Burgmeijer (born 1947), Dutch speed skater
- Wil de Visser (born 1952), Dutch footballer
- Will Allen Dromgoole (1860–1934), American author and poet
- Wil Lou Gray (1883–1984), American educator
- Wil Schuurman (born 1943), Dutch politician
- Wil van Gogh (1862–1941), Dutch nurse and feminist, youngest sister of Vincent van Gogh
- Will van Kralingen (1951–2012), Dutch actress
- Wil Velders-Vlasblom (1930–2019), Dutch politician

== Fictional characters ==
- Will Blake, in the Goosebumps series
- Will Byers, one of the main characters of Stranger Things
- Will Gardner, on the American TV series The Good Wife
- Will Graham (character), protagonist of Thomas Harris' 1981 novel Red Dragon
- Will Griggs, on the Australian soap opera Neighbours
- Will Horton, on the American soap opera Days of Our Lives
- Wil Ohmsford, in the fantasy novel The Elfstones of Shannara and the TV series The Shannara Chronicles
- Will Scarlet, one of Robin Hood's Merry Men
- Will Truman, one of the title characters of the TV sitcom Will & Grace
- Will Turner, in the Pirates of the Caribbean film series

== See also ==
- Will (disambiguation)
- Will (surname)
