= Thomas Willing =

American politician (1731–1821)

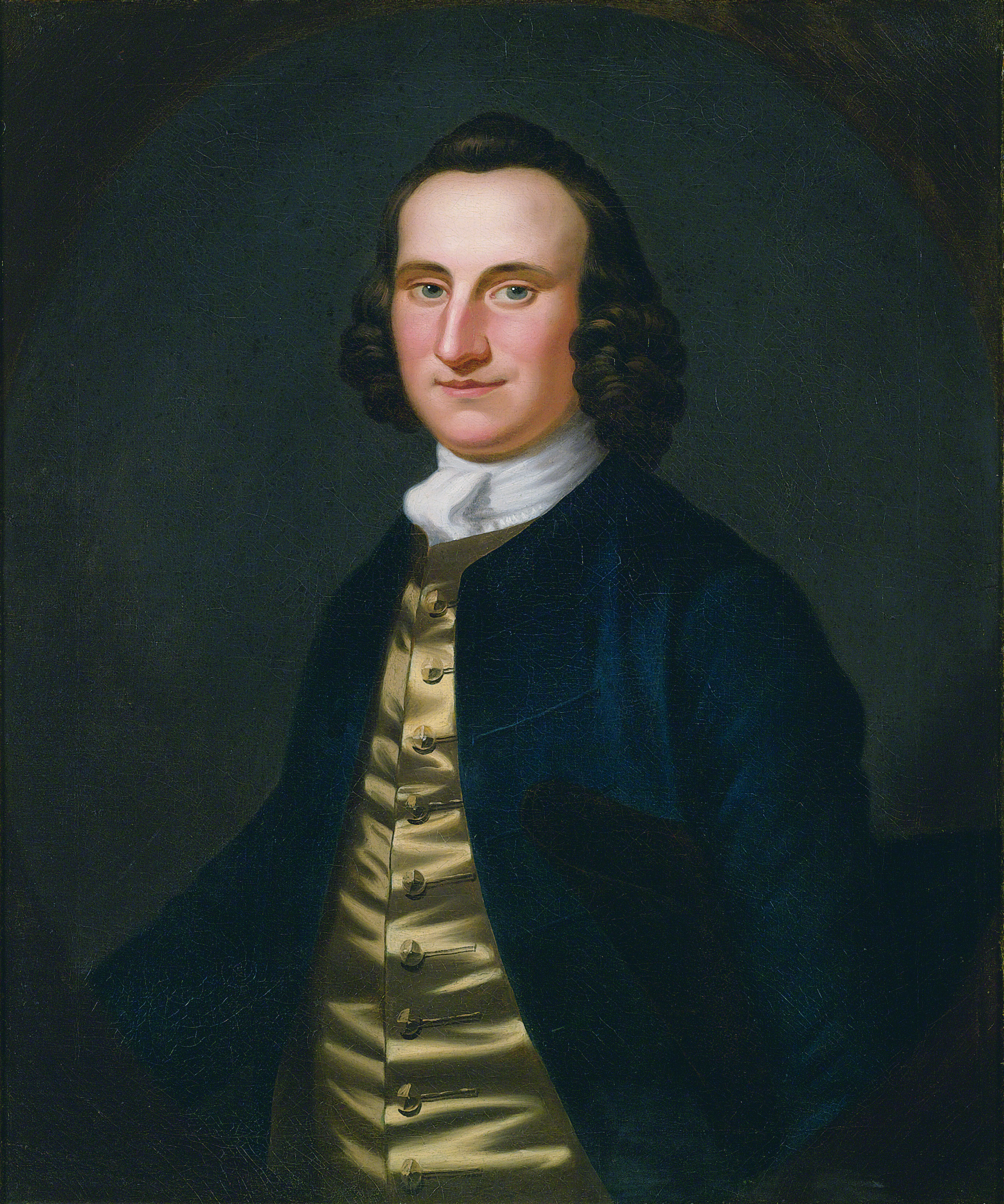
- Portrait by John Wollaston, c. 1752

President of First Bank of the United States
- In office October 25, 1791 – November 10, 1807
- President: George Washington; John Adams; Thomas Jefferson
- Preceded by: Position established
- Succeeded by: David Lenox

President of the Bank of North America
- In office January 7, 1782 – March 19, 1791
- President: George Washington
- Preceded by: Position established
- Succeeded by: John Nixon

Mayor of Philadelphia
- In office October 4, 1763 – October 2, 1764
- Preceded by: Henry Harrison
- Succeeded by: Thomas Lawrence

Personal details
- Born: December 19, 1731 Philadelphia, Pennsylvania, British America
- Died: January 19, 1821 (aged 89) Philadelphia, Pennsylvania, U.S.
- Resting place: Christ Church Burial Ground
- Spouse: Anne McCall (m. 1763; died 1781)
- Children: 13, including Ann and Mary
- Relatives: Charles Willing (father); James Willing (brother); Mary Willing Byrd (sister); Elizabeth Willing Powel (sister); Edward Shippen (great-grandfather)
- Education: Inner Temple

Thomas Willing (December 19, 1731 – January 19, 1821) was an American merchant, banker, and politician. He served as mayor of Philadelphia and as a delegate from Pennsylvania to the Continental Congress. He was also the first president of the Bank of North America and later of the First Bank of the United States. During his career, Willing amassed considerable wealth as a transatlantic merchant trading in "wheat, sugar, rum, and occasionally enslaved Africans". One account credits him with bankrolling the American Revolution. Another describes him as the richest man in America around 1800.

== Early life ==
Thomas Willing was born in Quaker Philadelphia, to an Anglican family, the son of Charles Willing (1710–1754), who twice served as mayor of Philadelphia, and Anne Shippen (1710-1791), granddaughter of Edward Shippen, who was the second mayor of Philadelphia. His brother, James Willing, was a Philadelphia merchant, who later served as a representative of the Continental Congress and led a 1778 military expedition to raid holdings of British loyalists in Natchez, Mississippi.

Thomas completed preparatory studies in Bath, England, then studied law in London at the Inner Temple.

== Career ==
In 1749, after studying in England, he returned to Philadelphia, where he engaged in mercantile pursuits in partnership with Robert Morris. They established the firm Willing, Morris and Company in 1757, which exported flour, lumber and tobacco to Europe while importing sugar, rum, molasses, and slaves from the West Indies and Africa. Their partnership continued until 1793. He was elected to the revived American Philosophical Society in 1768. According to Pennsylvania tax records, Willing owned three enslaved people in 1769, but none as of 1782.

=== Political career ===
A member of the common council in 1755, he became an alderman in 1759, associate justice of the city court on October 2, 1759, and then justice of the court of common pleas February 28, 1761. Willing then became Mayor of Philadelphia in 1763. In 1767, the Pennsylvania Assembly, with Governor Thomas Penn's assent, had authorized a Supreme Court justice (always a lawyer) to sit with local justices of the peace (judges of county courts, but laymen) in a system of Nisi Prius courts. Governor Penn appointed two new Supreme Court justices, John Lawrence and Thomas Willing. Willing served until 1767, the last under the colonial government.

A member of the Committee of Correspondence in 1774 and of the Committee of Safety in 1775, he served in the Continental Congress. In 1775 and 1776 he voted against the Declaration of Independence, but later subscribed £5,000 to supply the revolutionary cause.

=== Banker ===
From 1781 to 1791, Willing served as president of the Bank of North America, preceding John Nixon. In 1791, President George Washington appointed Willing along with two others as commissioners of the newly created First Bank of the United States. He was elected president of the bank later that year, and during his tenure, he became the richest man in America. In August 1807, Willing suffered a slight stroke, and within a few months, he resigned his position with the bank for health reasons.

== Personal life ==
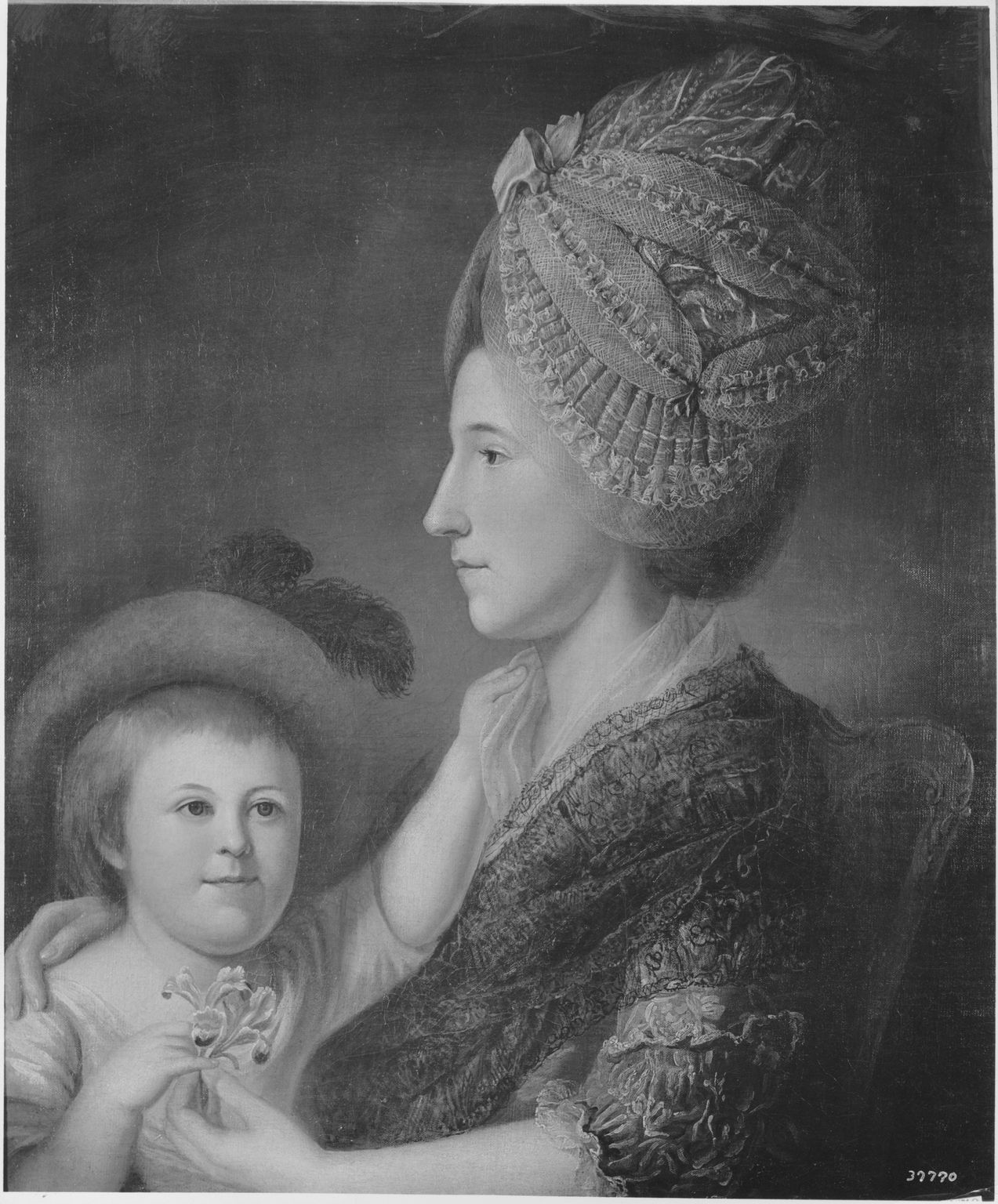
Portrait of Willing's wife Anne and son William by Charles Willson Peale

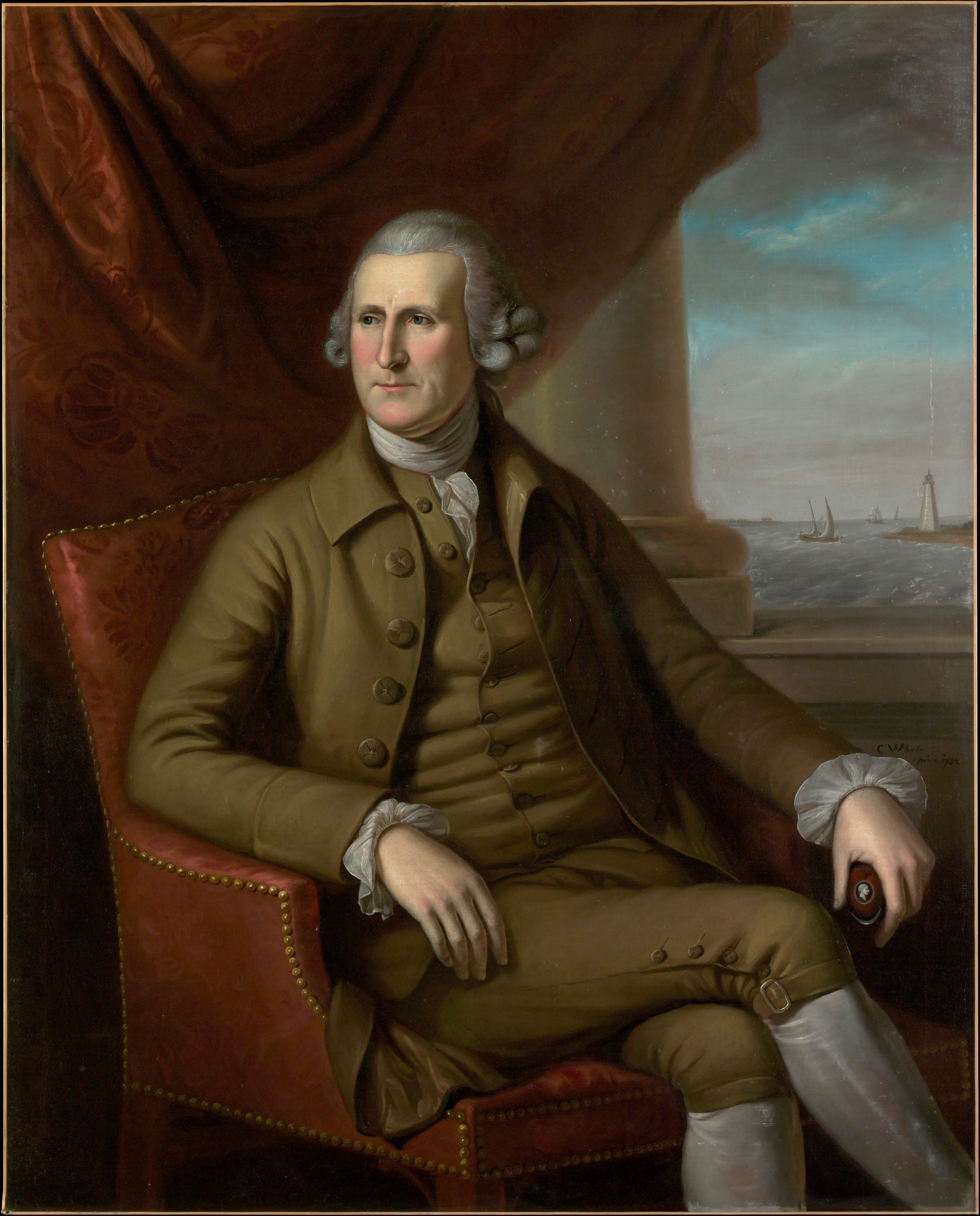
1782 portrait of Willing by Charles Willson Peale

In 1763, Willing married Anne McCall (1745–1781), daughter of Samuel McCall (1721–1762) and Anne Searle (1724–1757). Together, they had thirteen children, including:

- Anne Willing (1764–1801), who married William Bingham (1752–1804)
- Thomas Mayne Willing (1767–1822), who married Jane Nixon (1775–1823)
- Elizabeth Willing (1768–1858), who married William Jackson (1759–1828)
- Mary Willing (1770–1852), who married Henry Clymer (1767–1830)
- Dorothy Willing (1772–1842), who married Thomas Willing Francis, a cousin
- George Willing (1774–1827), who married Rebecca Harrison Blackwell (1782–1852)
- Richard Willing (1775–1858), who married Eliza Moore (1786–1823)
- Abigail Willing (1777–1841), who married Richard Peters (1780–1848).

Willing died in 1821 in Philadelphia, where he is interred in Christ Church Burial Ground.

=== Descendants ===
Willing was the great-uncle of John Brown Francis (1791–1864), who was a governor and United States Senator from Rhode Island.

Willing was also the grandfather of Ann Louisa Bingham (b. 1782), who married Alexander Baring, 1st Baron Ashburton (1774–1848), in 1798, and Maria Matilda Bingham (1783–1849), who was briefly married to Jacques Alexandre, Comte de Tilly, a French aristocrat and later married her sister's brother-in-law, Henry Baring (1777–1848), until their divorce in 1824. Maria later married the Marquis de Blaisel in 1826. Their brother, and Willing's grandson, William Bingham (1800–1852) married Marie-Charlotte Chartier de Lotbiniere (1805–1866), the second of the three daughters and heiresses of Michel-Eustache-Gaspard-Alain Chartier de Lotbinière by his second wife Mary, daughter of Captain John Munro, in 1822.

== See also ==
- Stephen Simpson, an outspoken journalist and fierce critic of the First National Bank and its practices.
- List of richest Americans in history

| Preceded by Henry Harrison (mayor) | Mayor of Philadelphia; 1763–1764 | Succeeded by Thomas Lawrence (II) |
