= William Bingham =

American politician (1752–1804)

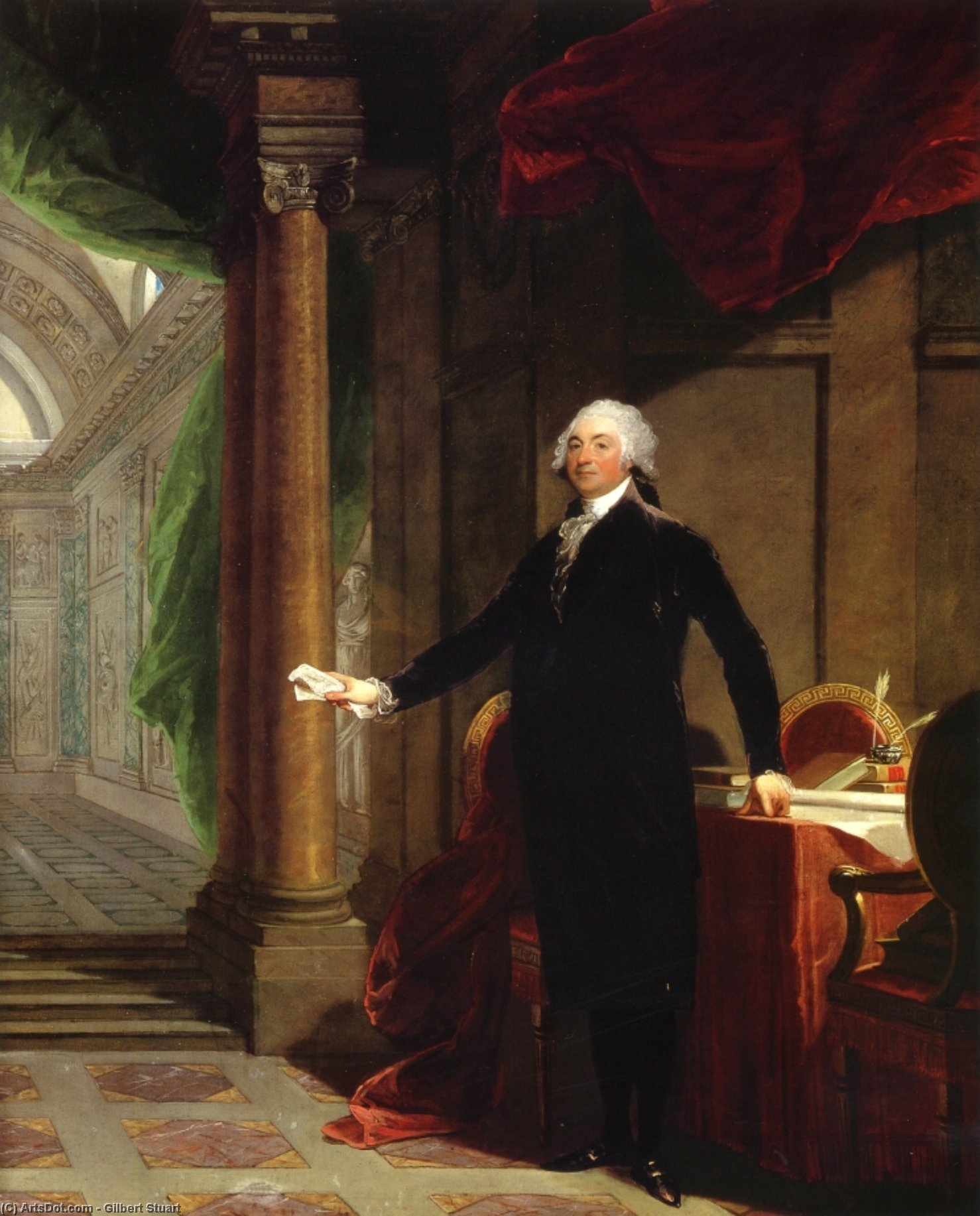
- Portrait by Gilbert Stuart, 1797

President pro tempore of the United States Senate
- In office February 16, 1797 – July 6, 1797
- Preceded by: Samuel Livermore
- Succeeded by: William Bradford

United States Senator from Pennsylvania
- In office March 4, 1795 – March 3, 1801
- Preceded by: Robert Morris
- Succeeded by: Peter Muhlenberg

37th and 38th Speaker of the Pennsylvania House of Representatives
- In office December 4, 1791 – April 10, 1792
- Preceded by: Himself (as Speaker of the Assembly)
- Succeeded by: Gerardus Wynkoop II

Member of the Pennsylvania House of Representatives
- In office 1793–1794

Secretary of the Committee of Secret Correspondence
- In office November 29, 1775 – April 17, 1777
- Preceded by: Office established
- Succeeded by: Thomas Paine

Personal details
- Born: March 8, 1752 Philadelphia, Province of Pennsylvania, British America
- Died: February 7, 1804 (aged 51) Bath, England
- Resting place: New York City
- Party: Federalist
- Spouse: Ann Willing
- Children: Maria Matilda; Anne Louisa; William
- Education: University of Pennsylvania
- Profession: Banker

William Bingham (March 8, 1752 – February 7, 1804) was an American statesman and wealthy merchant from Philadelphia. He represented Pennsylvania as a delegate to the Continental Congress from 1786 to 1788 and served as a United States senator from 1795 to 1801. Bingham was among the wealthiest Americans of his era, with some accounts describing him as the richest person in the United States in 1780.

== Early life ==
William Bingham was born on March 8, 1752, in Philadelphia. He graduated from the College of Philadelphia (now the University of Pennsylvania) in 1768.

== Philadelphia Society ==
Bingham first travelled to Europe in 1773 and, upon, returning to America joined the Philadelphia Society. Sent by the Committee of Secret Correspondence to Martinico (today's Martinique), to reside ostensibly as a merchant and to establish communications through that colony with Silas Deane, the committee's agent in France. He departed America aboard the frigate Reprisal on July 3, 1776. During his voyages, he established links with French merchants at Martinique, captured several British ships, and returned in 1777 to America with several full loads of munitions, guns, and other vital goods necessary for the fighting of a war.

== Business interests ==
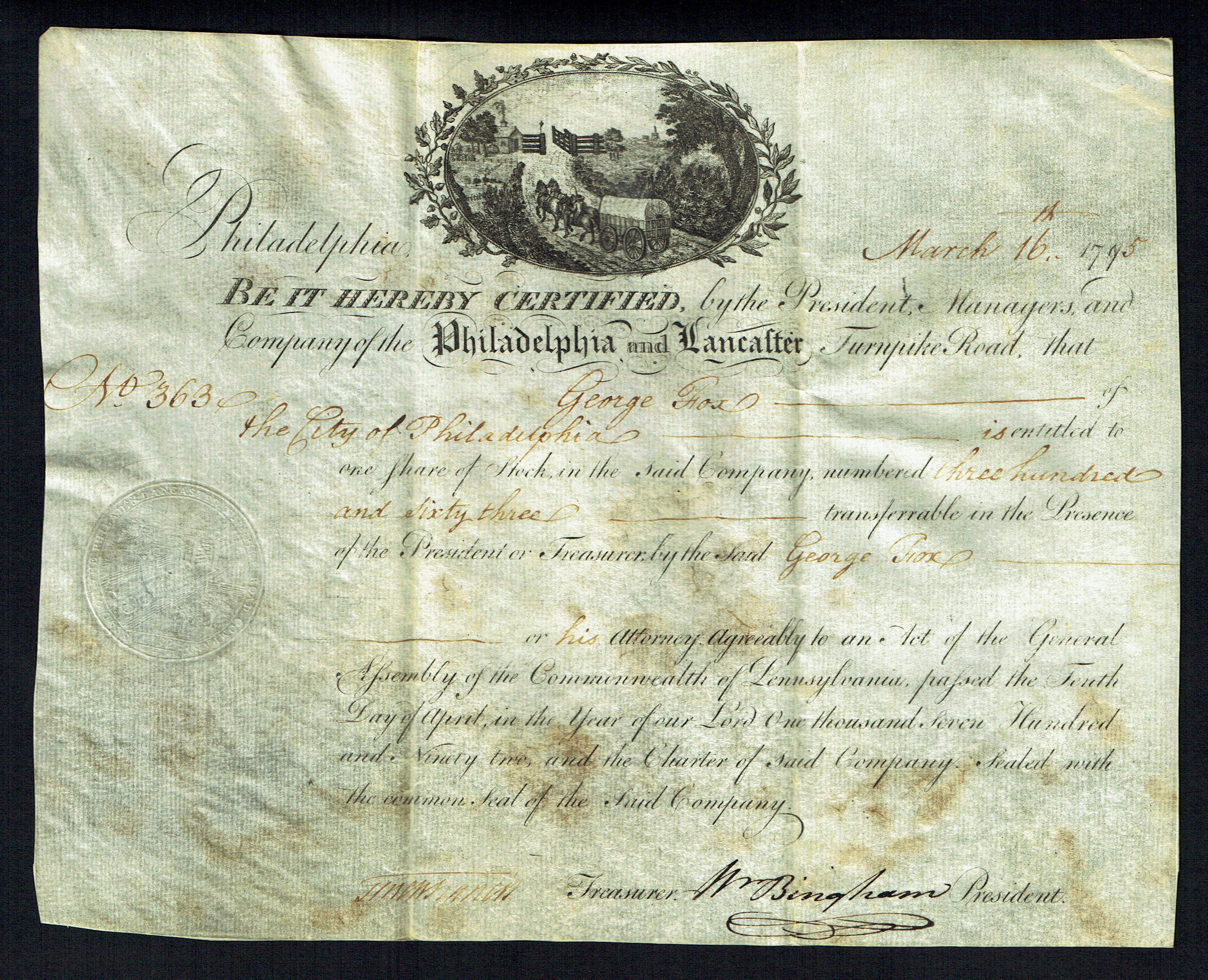
Share of the "Company of the Philadelphia and Lancaster Turnpike Road", issued March 16, 1795, signed by William Bingham

Toward the end of the American Revolution, Bingham was regarded as the richest man in the United States. He had made his fortune through joint ownership of privateers and trading. He became a major land developer, purchasing lands in upstate New York (present-day Binghamton) and 2 million acres (8,000 km^{2}) in Maine (later known as the Bingham Purchase). He helped broker the Louisiana Purchase with Francis Baring and Henry Hope. Their agent Alexander Baring married his daughter Anne.

He was the founder and the first president of the Philadelphia and Lancaster Turnpike.

Bingham was director of several other enterprises. He maintained shipping ventures after the Revolutionary war, through his mercantile house Bingham, Inglis, and Gilmor. He was a leading member of the Pennsylvania Society for the Encouragement of Manufactures and Useful Arts and donated a Philadelphia property to be converted into a textile factory.

=== Mounted general ===
During the 1780s, Bingham marshaled the Second Troop of Philadelphia Light Horse, an outfit of 50 dragoons. They were glamorously clad and saw little action. William Jackson was first major and later became Bingham's land agent. Bingham escorted President-elect George Washington through Pennsylvania with his troop on his April 1789 journey from Valley Forge to New York City to assume the presidency.

Bingham was elected to the American Philosophical Society in 1787.

== Politics ==
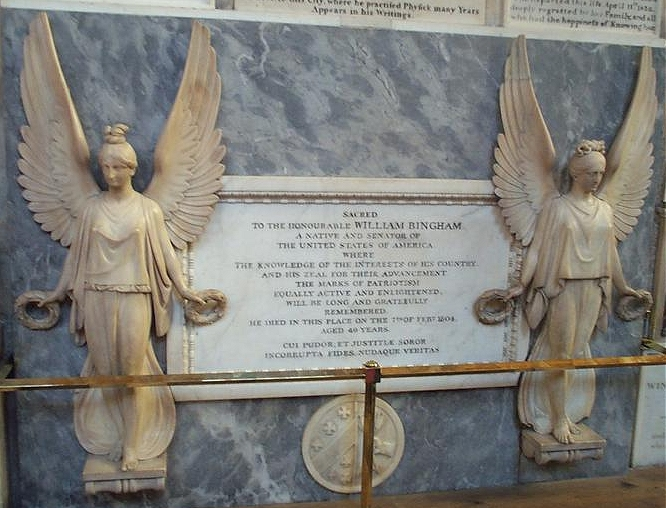
Memorial to Bingham in Bath Abbey, Bath, England

During the provisional government of the United States at Philadelphia, he wrote the by-laws for the national Bank of North America. He saw the national debt as beneficial in that it attracted interest into the affairs of the government. During the first presidency, Treasurer Alexander Hamilton sought Bingham as his mentor in managing taxes, tariffs, and in constructing a national bank.

=== Speaker of Pennsylvania House ===
In America, he represented Pennsylvania as a delegate to the Continental Congress from 1786 to 1788. In 1790 and 1791 he was elected to the Pennsylvania House of Representatives, serving as its first speaker in 1791. He oversaw development of the land during a fledgling period of America as a member of the Society of Roads and Inland Navigation, where he worked closely with Albert Gallatin of western Pennsylvania. After unsuccessfully running in the 1792 election for Pennsylvania's at-large congressional district, he was later elected to the Pennsylvania State Senate from 1793 through 1794. He built roads and a bridge from Philadelphia to Lancaster, Pennsylvania called the Lancaster Pike.

=== U.S. Senator ===
By 1795, he was elected to the United States Senate where he served as a Federalist and Nationalist while it was originally at Philadelphia, but he left for England in 1801 when his wife had taken ill. In the midst of public debate and dissent focused on the Jay Treaty he was subjected to political violence in Philadelphia in the summer of 1795. He was an active supporter of John Adams and when Adams was elected president, Bingham served as the Senate's President pro tempore in the Fourth Congress. On March 4, 1797, with the start of the Fifth Congress he administered the oath of office to Vice President Thomas Jefferson. He was criticized by Jeffersonian politicians for "extravagance, ostentation and dissipation". In 1813, nearly ten years after his death, John Quincy Adams said that the Presidency, the Capital and the Country had been governed by Bingham and his family connections.

The several Bingham estates were renowned for hosting many prominent aristocrats from Europe as well as Federalist meetings. At the Bingham estate, Federalists agreed to hold preliminary votings before propositions were brought before Congress publicly, thus creating unanimity among party lines.

== Binghamton ==
He was also a land surveyor, and looked to develop areas currently a part of Southern New York, and Northern Pennsylvania. One of his prime prospects was at the confluence of the Chenango River and Susquehanna River. Judge Joshua Whitney Jr., settler and Bingham's agent, called this town Binghamton to honor him. Furthermore, Binghamton's resident university Binghamton University recognizes Bingham through the naming of Bingham Hall.

== Family ==
He married Anne Willing, daughter of Thomas Willing, President of the First Bank of the United States, and they had two daughters and a son.

- Ann Louisa Bingham (1782–1848). In 1798, she married Alexander Baring, 1st Baron Ashburton. They were the parents of nine children.
- Maria Matilda Bingham (1783–1849), who, at the age of 15, was briefly married to a French aristocrat, Jacques Alexandre, Comte de Tilly. Afterwards she married her sister's brother-in-law, Henry Baring. They were the parents of five children. Maria and Henry were divorced in 1824; she married the Marquis de Blaisel in 1826.
- William Bingham (1800–1855), who married Marie-Charlotte Chartier de Lotbinière (1804-1865), Seigneuresse de Rigaud, in 1822. She was the second of the three daughters and heiresses of Michel-Eustache-Gaspard-Alain Chartier de Lotbinière, by his second wife Mary, daughter of Captain John Munro. They lived in Montreal, Paris and London; and were the parents of six children. William Bingham died in Paris in September 1855 and was buried at the Cimetière du Montparnasse with his wife and younger son.

Although his wife and two daughters factored prominently in the social affairs of American politics, Bingham's wife Anne died while his only son William was one year old. William Sr. left William Jr. to grow up in America with his grandfather Thomas Willing.

Bingham died on February 7, 1804, in Bath, England and is interred in Bath Abbey. His estate remained in the family until the death of William Alexander Baring Bingham (1858–1915) but it was not settled until 1964.

=== Portraits ===
Bingham commissioned artist Gilbert Stuart to paint the Lansdowne Portrait, a 1796 full-length portrait of President George Washington that became a gift to Lord Lansdowne. As British Prime Minister, Lansdowne had secured a peaceful end to the American Revolutionary War, and the portrait was commissioned soon after the American approval of the Jay Treaty. Stuart also painted portraits of Bingham, his wife and children.

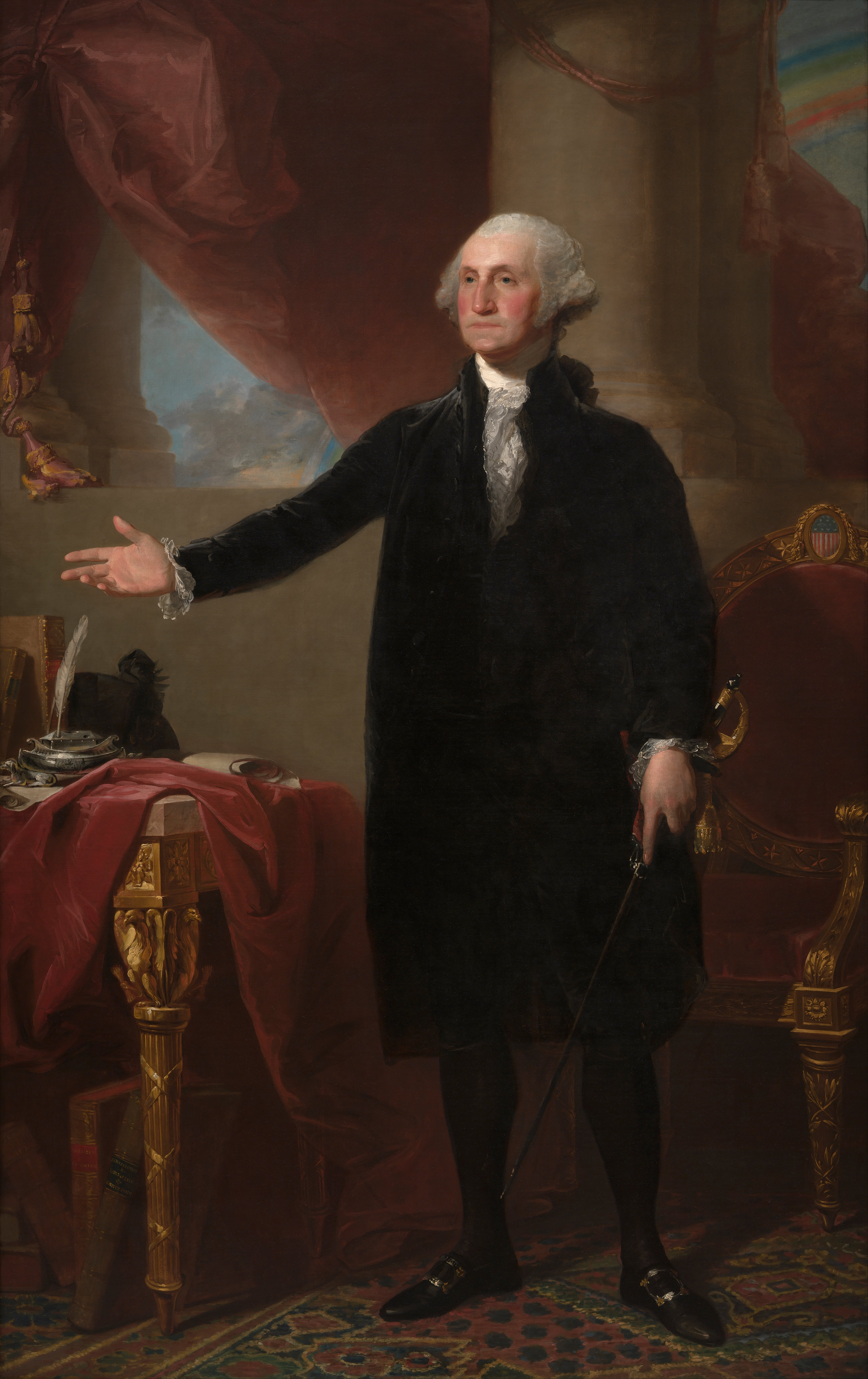
George Washington Lansdowne Portrait (1796) by Gilbert Stuart, National Portrait Gallery (United States).

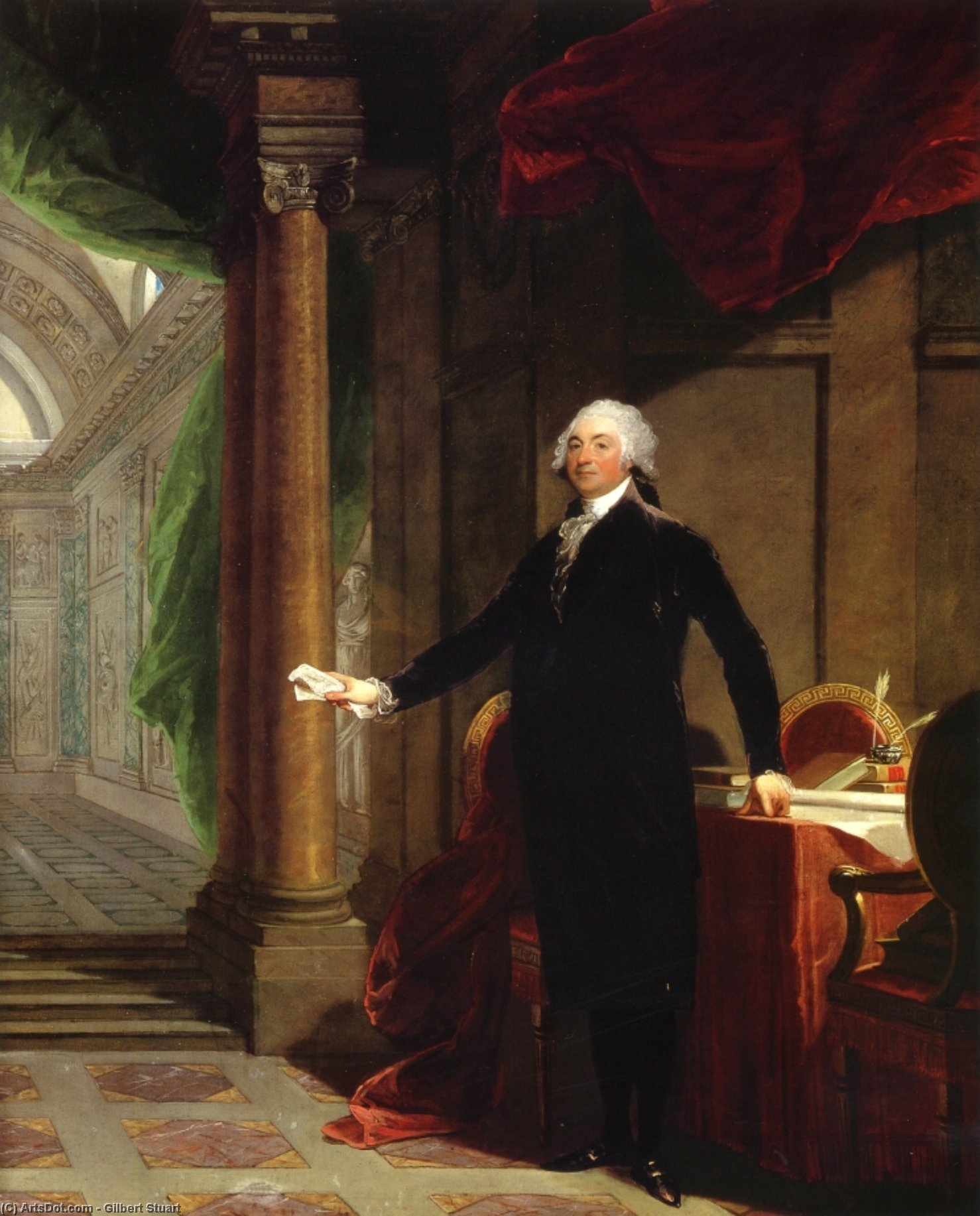
William Bingham (1797), by Gilbert Stuart, Baring archive, ING Bank NV, London.

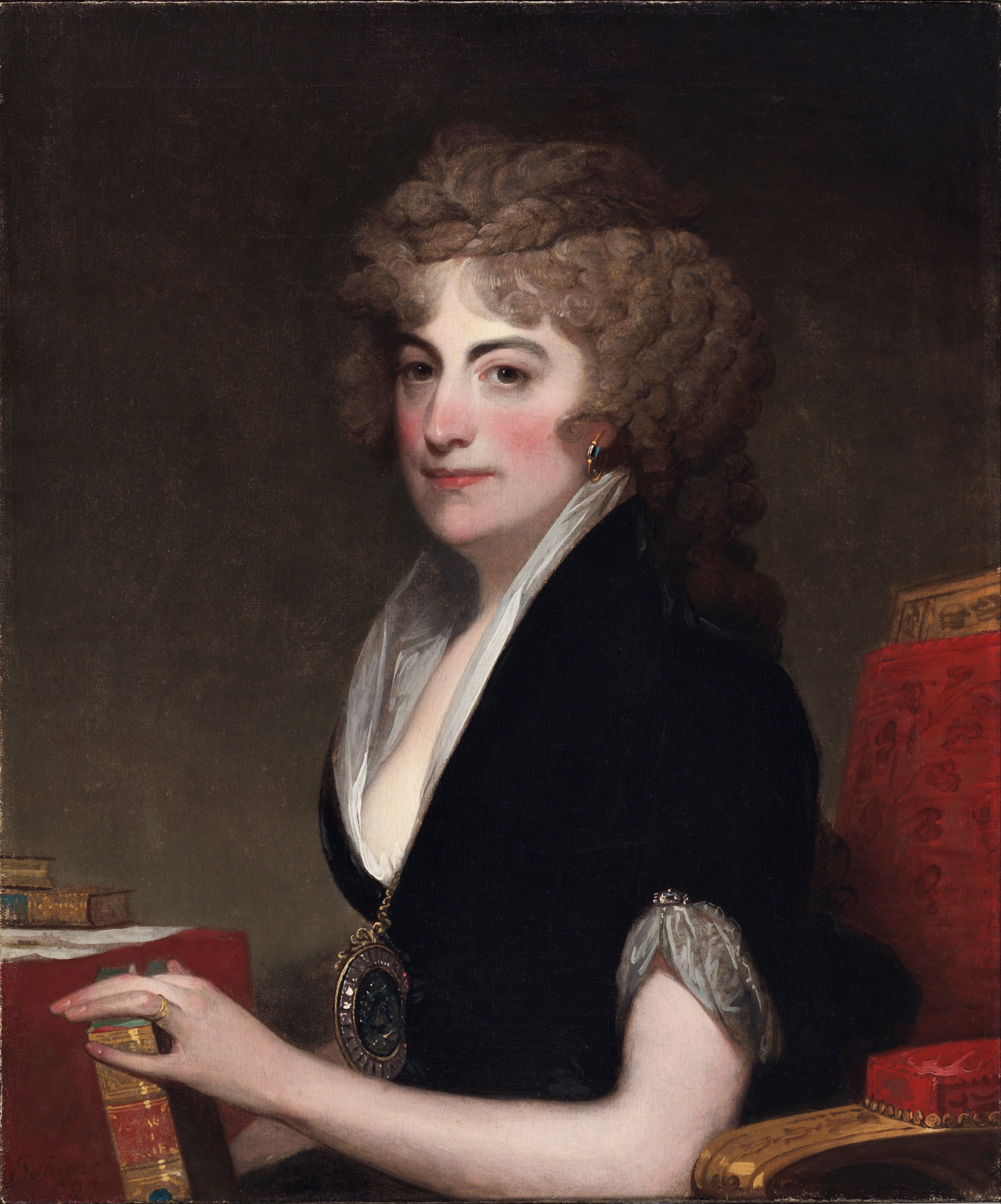
Anne Willing Bingham (1797) by Gilbert Stuart, Philadelphia Museum of Art.

== See also ==
- Speaker of the Pennsylvania House of Representatives
- List of richest Americans in history

U.S. Senate
Preceded by Robert Morris	U.S. senator (Class 3) from Pennsylvania; 1795–1801; Served alongside: James Ross	Succeeded by John Peter G. Muhlenberg
Political offices
Preceded by Samuel Livermore	President pro tempore of the United States Senate; 1797	Succeeded by William Bradford
Preceded by Office Created	Speaker of the Pennsylvania House of Representatives; 1791–1792	Succeeded by Gerardus Wynkoop II
