= Ann Baring, Baroness Ashburton =

American-born British peeress

The Right Honourable The Lady Ashburton
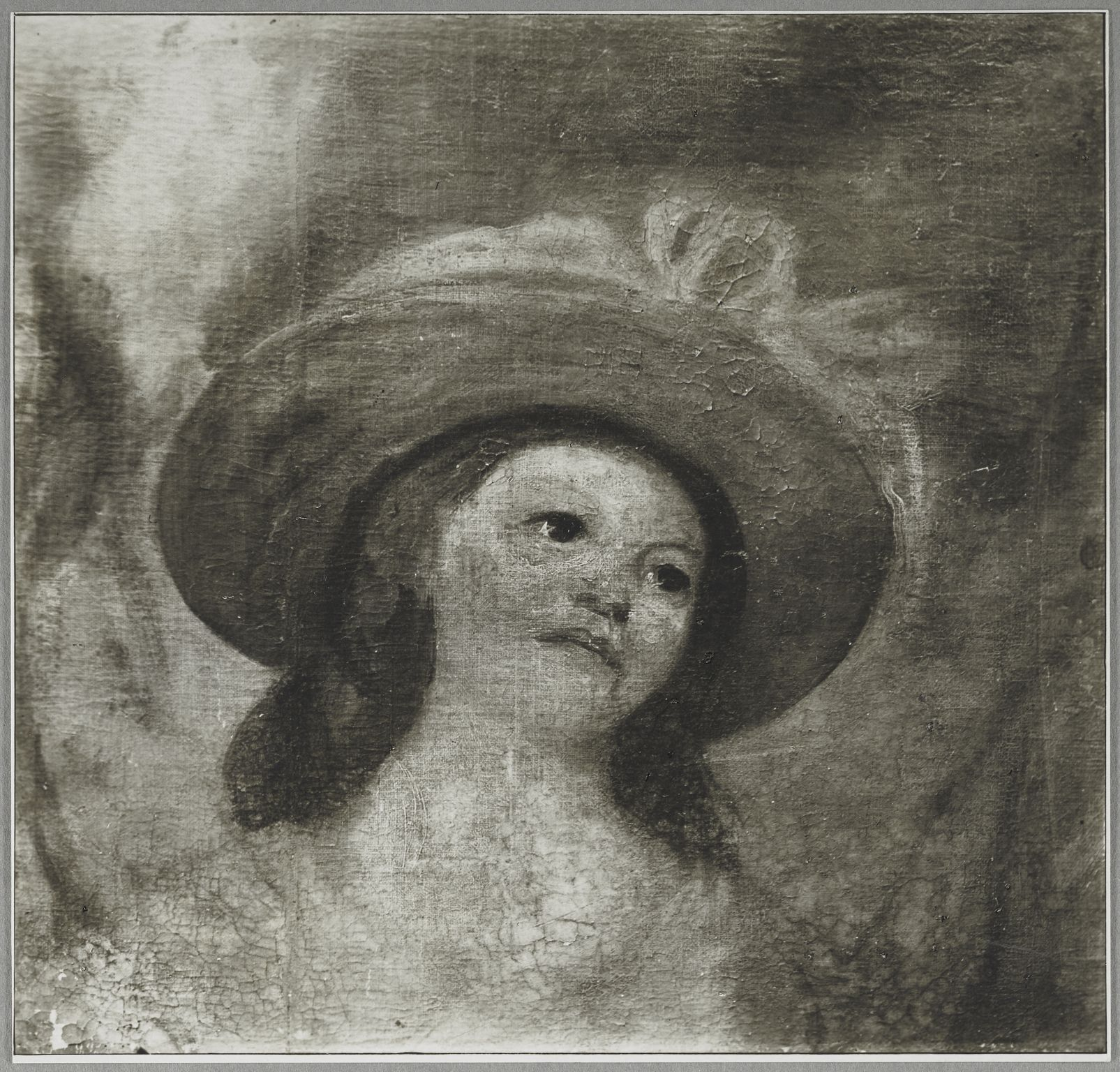
- Section from an unfinished Bingham family portrait by Gilbert Stuart

Personal details
- Born: Ann Louisa Bingham; 6 January 1782
- Died: 5 December 1848 (aged 66) Bay House, Gosport, England
- Spouse: Alexander Baring, 1st Baron Ashburton (m. 1798; died 1848)
- Relations: Maria Matilda Bingham (sister)
- Children: 9, including Bingham Baring, 2nd Baron Ashburton, Francis Baring, 3rd Baron Ashburton, Harriet Thynne, Marchioness of Bath
- Parent(s): William Bingham; Ann Willing Bingham

Ann Louisa Baring, Baroness Ashburton (née Ann Louisa Bingham; 6 January 1782 – 5 December 1848) was the wife of Alexander Baring, Lord Ashburton and first child of William Bingham and Ann Willing Bingham.

== Early life ==
Ann Louisa Bingham was born on 6 January 1782, the day before the Bank of North America sold its first charter shares; her father and grandfather worked closely with Alexander Hamilton to write the by-laws. Her father was rumored to be the richest man in America after the Revolutionary War.

Her younger sister, Maria Matilda Bingham, married three times: first to French aristocrat Jacques Alexandre, Count of Tilly; afterwards to Anne Louisa's brother-in-law, Henry Baring; and after their divorce in 1824, she married the Marquess of Blaisel in 1826.

== Personal life ==
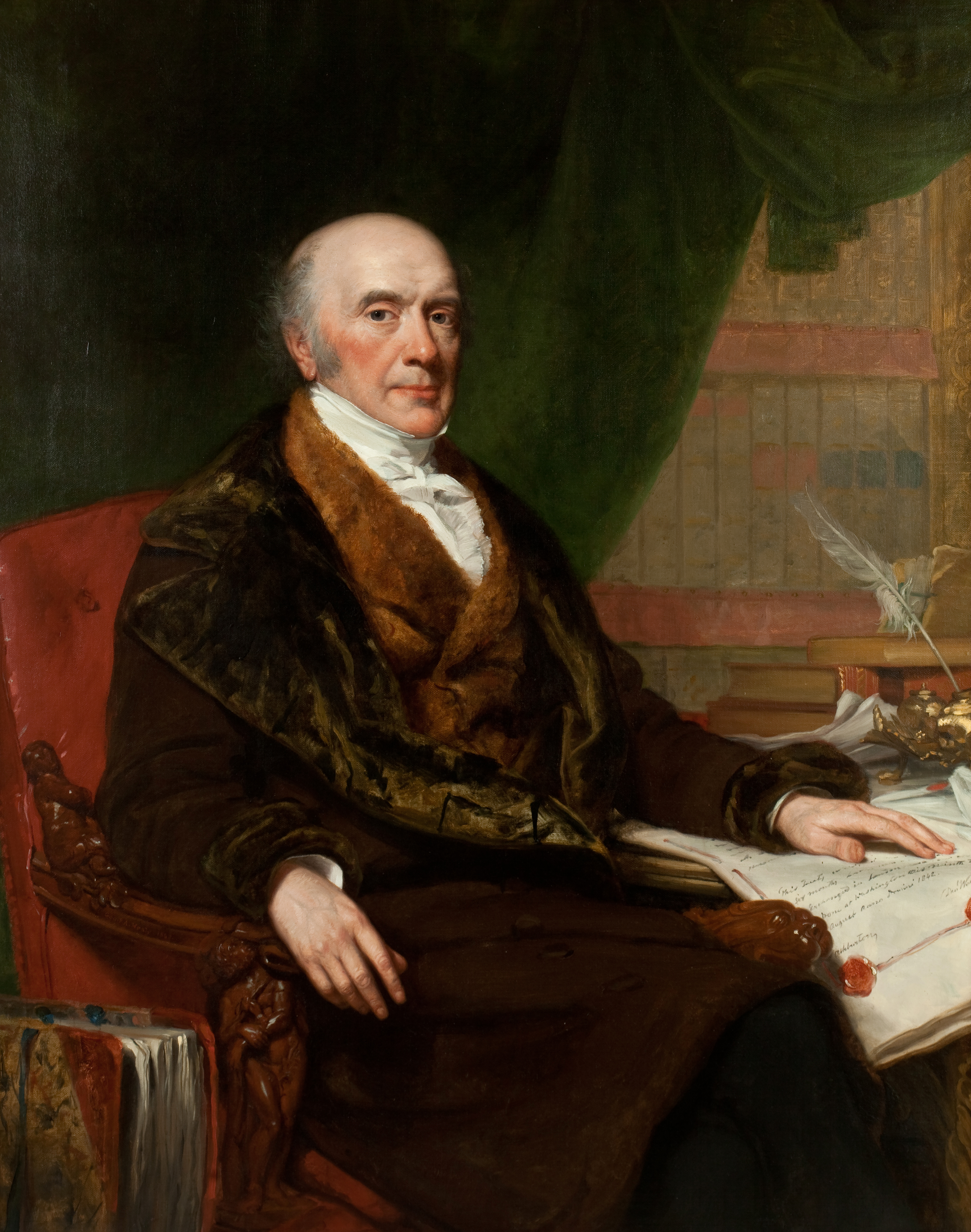
1842 portrait of Ann's husband Lord Ashburton by George Peter Alexander Healy

On 23 August 1798, Ann was married to Alexander Baring (1774–1848), a son of Harriet Herring and Sir Francis Baring, 1st Baronet. Among his siblings were Sir Thomas Baring, 2nd Baronet and Henry Baring (an MP for Bossiney and Colchester), His father, alongside his uncle John Baring, established the London merchant house of John and Francis Baring Company, which eventually became Barings Bank. Together, Ann and Alexander had nine children:

- Bingham Baring, 2nd Baron Ashburton (1799–1864), who married Lady Harriet Montagu, eldest daughter of George Montagu, 6th Earl of Sandwich.
- Francis Baring, 3rd Baron Ashburton (1800–1868), who married Hortense Maret (c. 1812–1882), daughter of Hughes-Bernard Maret, 1st Duke of Bassano, Prime Minister of France.
- Hon. Harriet Baring (1804–1892), married Henry Thynne, 3rd Marquess of Bath.
- Hon. Rev. Frederick Baring (1806–1868), Rector of Itchen Stoke, married Frederica Ashton on 24 April 1831.
- Hon. Anne Eugenia Baring (d. 1839), married Humphrey St John-Mildmay.
- Alexander Baring (1810–1832), who died on board HMS Alfred in the Mediterranean.
- Hon. Arthur Baring (1818–1838), who died unmarried.
- Hon. Louisa Emily Baring (d. 1888)
- Hon. Lydia Emily Baring (d. 1868)

In 1835, her husband was created the first Baron Ashburton in the Peerage of the United Kingdom.

Lord Ashburton died on 12 May 1848 at Longleat, Wiltshire. Lady Ashburton died several months later on 5 December 1848 at Bay House in Gosport.

=== Descendants ===
Through her eldest son, she was a grandmother of Hon. Mary Florence Baring (1860–1902), who married William Compton, 5th Marquess of Northampton. Through her second son, she was a grandmother of Alexander Baring, 4th Baron Ashburton (1835–1889), and Hon. Maria Anne Louisa Baring (1833–1928), who married William FitzRoy, 6th Duke of Grafton.
