= Pilot (Six Feet Under) =

- Six Feet Under episode
- Episode no.: Season 1 Episode 1
- Directed by: Alan Ball
- Written by: Alan Ball
- Original air date: June 3, 2001
- Running time: 62 minutes

Guest appearances
- Richard Jenkins as Nathaniel Fisher Sr.; Jeremy Sisto as Billy Chenowith- (uncredited)

Episode chronology
| ← Previous — | Next → "The Will" |

"Pilot" (also called "Six Feet Under") is the pilot episode of the American drama television series Six Feet Under. Written and directed by series creator Alan Ball, the episode originally aired in the United States on the premium cable network HBO on June 3, 2001.

== Plot ==
On Christmas Eve 2000, Nathaniel Fisher Sr., owner of Fisher & Sons Funeral Home in Los Angeles, died after he was hit by a bus while driving his brand new hearse. Nathaniel Sr.'s oldest son and namesake, Nate, has flown in from Seattle for the holidays and is informed about his father's untimely death immediately after a sexual encounter with Brenda Chenowith in the airport. Brenda drives Nate to the mortuary where he is re-united with his mother, Ruth, and younger sister, Claire. Brenda departs and after identifying the body, she and Nate return to the family home where Nathaniel Sr.'s younger son, David, is waiting.

Various tensions and conflicts emerge following Nathaniel Sr.'s death and beyond. Claire has been experimenting with drugs, Ruth reveals that she had a long-standing affair with a fellow churchgoer, and David has been concealing his homosexuality and relationship with Keith, a policeman, from his family. David also shows resentment towards Nate for leaving the family and the business which he now manages. Nate becomes frustrated at his family and himself, expressing dissatisfaction with his life. Nathaniel Sr.'s spectre appears to members of his family and engages them in conversation. Ruth requests that Nate delay his return to Seattle and he agrees.

== Production ==
Eric Balfour was only supposed to be introduced as "Claire's Meth Date" for the show's pilot, but director Alan Ball found his chemistry so satisfying with Lauren Ambrose that his role was developed into the character Gabe Dimas. Similarly, Dina Waters's and Gary Hershberger's roles were only listed as "Chatty Mourner" and "Kroehner Representative", whose roles were developed into Tracy Montrose Blair and Matthew Gilardi respectively, and would go on to have recurring roles.

The episode features humorous funeral home related commercials that would start each act, but the idea was abandoned and the pilot is the only episode in which they were used.

== Reception ==
The pilot episode was positively received and earned several award wins and nominations. Creator Alan Ball won for Outstanding Directing for a Drama Series at the 54th Primetime Emmy Awards, while the episode received nominations for Outstanding Art Direction for a Single Camera Series, Outstanding Makeup for a Series (Non-Prosthetic), Outstanding Single Camera Picture Editing for a Series, and Outstanding Single Camera Sound Mixing for a Series. Alan Ball also won for Outstanding Directorial Achievement in Dramatic Series for the 2001 Directors Guild of America Awards. The episode won an Art Directors Guild Award for Excellence in Production Design in 2001.
