= Mary Willing Clymer =

American socialite

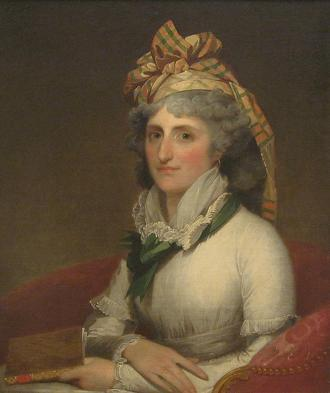
- 1797 portrait
- Born: Mary Willing; 1770
- Died: 1852 (aged 81–82)
- Known for: Philadelphia social figure
- Spouse: Henry Clymer (m. 1794)
- Children: 8
- Parent(s): Thomas Willing; Anne McCall

Mary Willing Clymer (1770–1852) was an American socialite in Philadelphia during the city's time as capital of the United States.

== Life ==
Mary Willing Clymer was born Mary Willing on September 15, 1770, in Philadelphia, Pennsylvania, one of thirteen children born to parents Thomas Willing and Anne McCall. Her father was a former Mayor of Philadelphia (1763–1764) and a Pennsylvania Supreme Court justice (1767–1777). He went on to become the president of the Bank of North America and First Bank of the United States after the American Revolution.

Mary wed Henry Clymer on July 9, 1794 and the couple had eight children. Henry was the son of George Clymer, who signed both the Declaration of Independence and the U.S. Constitution. Mary sat for a portrait by famed painter Gilbert Stuart in 1797. The portrait's caption notes that she was, "one of Philadelphia's premier social figures during the era when the city was the nation's capital".

== Sources ==
- ancestry.com Burnell, Jim George Clymer the Signer (accessed 16 October 2011)
- Biographical Directory of the United States Congress Clymer, George (accessed 16 October 2011)
- Independence National Historical Park portrait gallery
