= Will =

Will may refer to:

== Common meanings ==
- Will and testament, instructions for the disposition of one's property after death
- Will (philosophy), or willpower
- Will (sociology)
- Will, volition (psychology)
- Will, a modal verb - see Shall and will

== Arts, entertainment, and media ==
=== Films ===
- Will: G. Gordon Liddy, a 1982 TV film
- Will (1981 film), an American drama
- Will (2011 film), a British sports drama
- Will, a Japanese documentary film featuring Masahiro Higashide
- Bandslam, a 2008 film with the working title Will

=== Literature ===
- Will (novel), by Christopher Rush
- Will (Will Self memoir), 2019
- Will (Will Smith memoir), 2021
- Will, an autobiography by G. Gordon Liddy

=== Music ===
- Will (band), a Canadian electronic music act
- Will (Julianna Barwick album), a 2016 album by Julianna Barwick
- Will (Leo O'Kelly album), a 2011 album by Leo O'Kelly
- Will, a 1999 album by Akina Nakamori
- "Will" (Ayumi Hamasaki song), 2005
- "Will" (Mika Nakashima song), 2002
- "Will" (Joyner Lucas song), 2020

=== Radio ===
- WILL (AM), an NPR member station licensed to Urbana, Illinois, United States
- WILL-FM, an NPR member station licensed to Urbana, Illinois, United States
- WRMR (FM), a radio station licensed to Jacksonville, North Carolina, United States, which called itself "Will FM" from 2006 to 2008
- WYHW, a radio station licensed to Wilmington, North Carolina, which called itself "Will FM" from 2008 to 2009

=== Other uses in arts, entertainment, and media ===
- Will (TV series), a TV series on the life of William Shakespeare
- Will: The Death Trap II, a video game
- WILL-TV, a PBS member station licensed to Urbana, Illinois, United States
- Will Wylde, a fictional character from the animated series Wylde Pak

== Law ==
- Wisconsin Institute for Law and Liberty, a conservative law firm
- Women in Law and Litigation ("WILL"), in India

== People ==
- Will (comics) (1927–2000), a comic strip artist
- Will (given name), a list of people and fictional characters named Will or Wil
- Will (surname)
- Will (Brazilian footballer) (born 1973)
- Will (singer), Italian singer-songwriter

== Ships ==
- Will (1797 ship), a slave ship
- Will (Thames barge), a 1925 Thames sailing barge

== Other uses ==
- Will County, Illinois, United States
- WiLL, a brand used by a small group of Japanese companies
- Weakside linebacker, or will, in gridiron football

== See also ==
- Bill (disambiguation)
- The Will (disambiguation)
- William (disambiguation)
- Willing (disambiguation)
- Wills (disambiguation)
