= Ann Willing Bingham =

American socialite

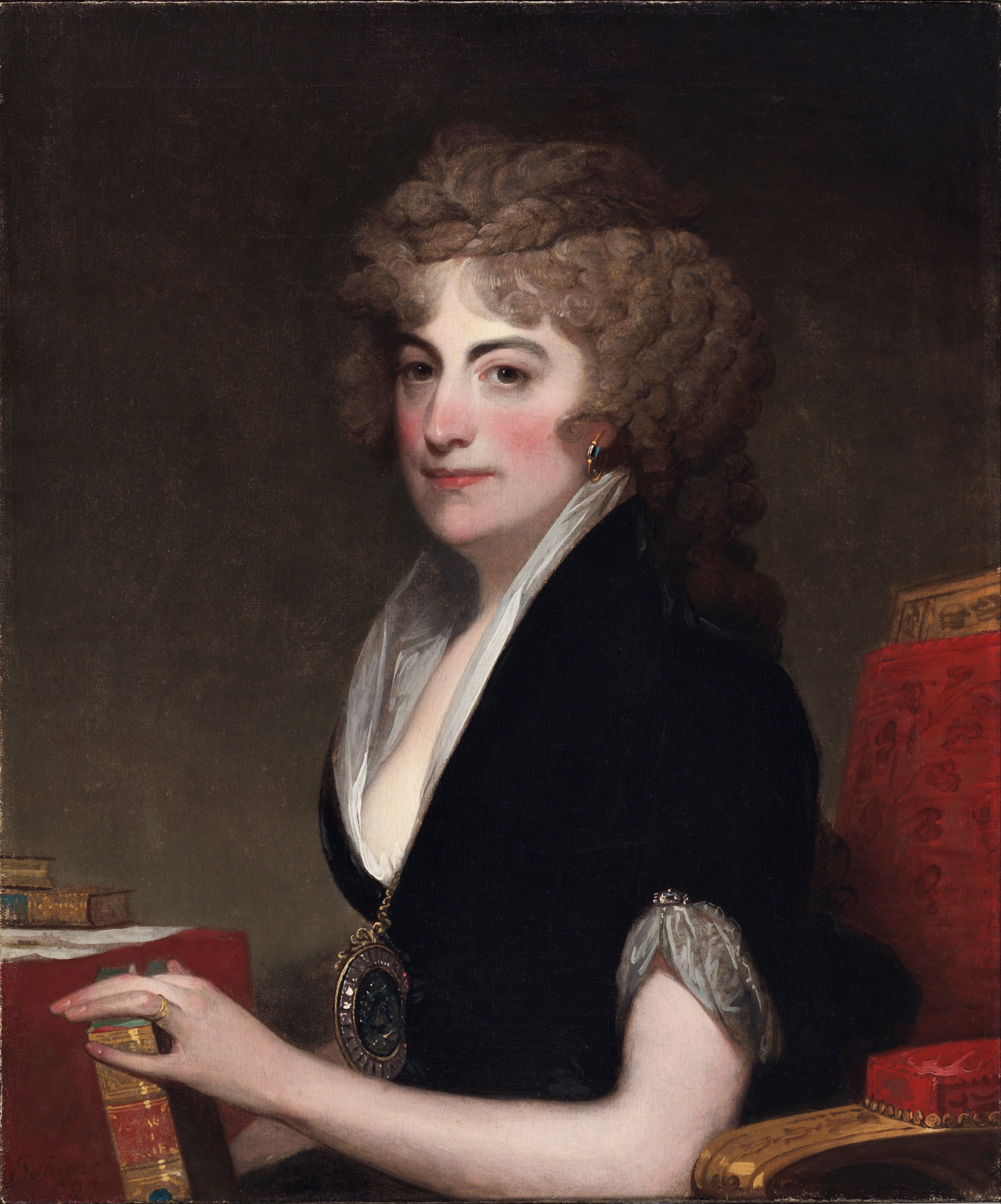
- Anne Willing Bingham (1797), Philadelphia Museum of Art
- Born: August 1, 1764; Philadelphia, Pennsylvania
- Died: May 11, 1801 (aged 36); Bermuda
- Spouse: William Bingham
- Children: 3, including Ann and Maria
- Parent: Thomas Willing
- Relatives: James Willing (uncle); Charles Willing (grandfather); Elizabeth Willing Powel (aunt)

Ann (or Anne) Willing Bingham (August 1, 1764 – May 11, 1801) was an American socialite from Philadelphia. During the federal government's residency there, she presided over salon-like dinners and entertainments comparable to those of Madame Roland in France and Lady Holland in England.

== Early life ==
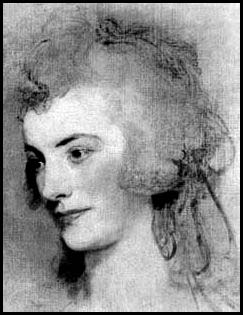
Ann at 21, sketch by Gilbert Stuart, 1785.

She was the eldest daughter of thirteen children born to Anne (née McCall) Willing and Thomas Willing, the first president of the First Bank of the United States.

Her paternal grandparents were Charles Willing, who twice served as mayor of Philadelphia, and Anne (née Shippen) Willing (a granddaughter of Edward Shippen, who was the second mayor of Philadelphia). Her uncle, James Willing, was a Philadelphia merchant who later served as a representative of the Continental Congress. Her maternal grandparents were Samuel McCall and Anne (née Searle) McCall.

== Legacy ==
=== Correspondence with Thomas Jefferson ===
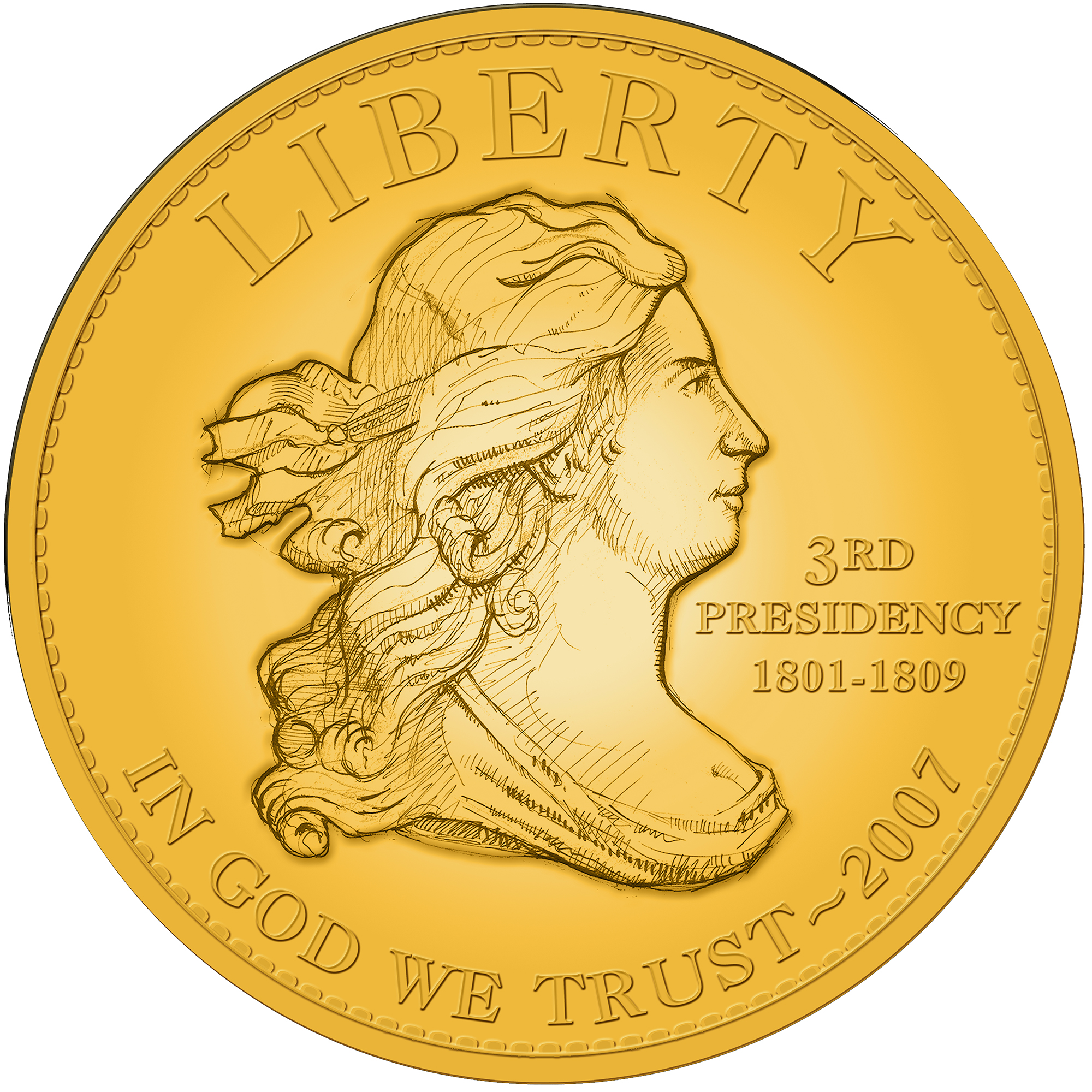
2007 Presidential Spouse commemorative gold coin, allegedly portraying Ann Willing Bingham as Lady Liberty.

She corresponded, among others, with President Thomas Jefferson. Bingham traveled widely alongside her husband, including to Paris, which was said she particularly loved. Writing to Bingham from Paris in a letter dated February 7, 1787, Jefferson argued that "the tranquil pleasures of America [were] preferable to the empty bustle of Paris." "In Paris you're consumed with ennui, with no object beyond the present moment," Jefferson wrote. "In America, on the other hand, the society of your husband, the fond cares for the children, the arrangements of the house, the improvements of the grounds, fill every moment with a healthy and an useful activity. Every exertion is encouraging, because to present amusement, it joins the promise of some future good."

Bingham argued that women in the U.S. should play an active role in politics, citing women who did so at the time in France as examples. In a 1787 letter to Jefferson, she wrote, "The Women of France interfere in the politics of the Country, and often give a decided Turn to the Fate of Empires...[T]hey have obtained that Rank of Consideration in society, which the Sex are intitled to...[American women] are therefore bound in Gratitude to admire and revere them, for asserting our Privileges."

=== Purported model for American coinage ===
Bingham was the model for multiple portraits by painter Gilbert Stuart. It has been suggested that Bingham was the model for Lady Liberty on American "Draped Bust" coinage during the first decade of the 19th century.

== Personal life ==
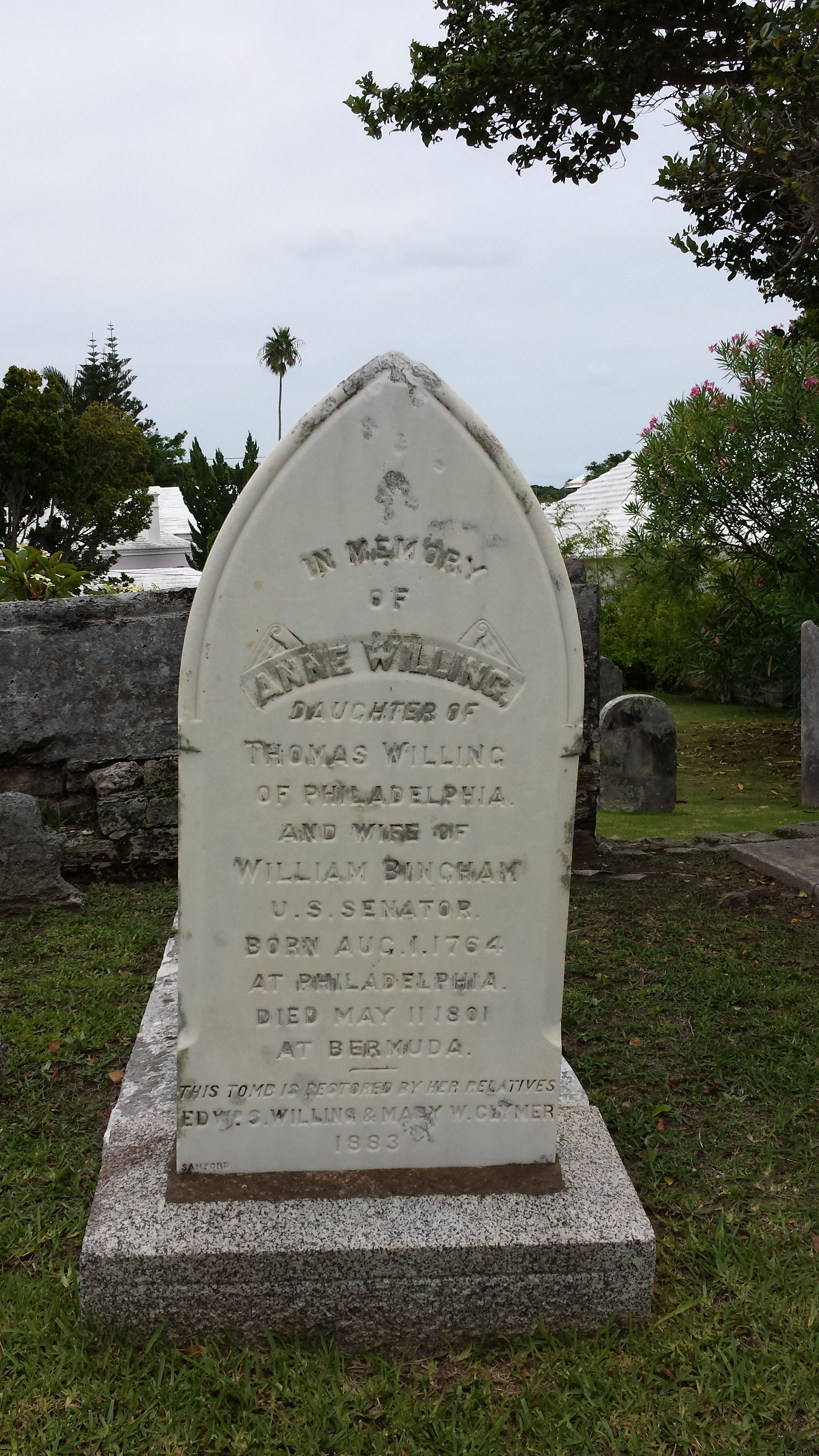
Ann Willing Bingham's tombstone at St. Peter's Church, St. George's, Bermuda.

Ann was married to wealthy William Bingham, a United States senator from Pennsylvania. By the end of the American Revolution, he was regarded as one of the richest men in Pennsylvania, having made his fortune through trading and ownership of privateers. Together, they were the parents of two daughters and a son, including:

- Ann Louisa Bingham (b. 1782), who married Alexander Baring, 1st Baron Ashburton in 1798. They were the parents of nine children.
- Maria Matilda Bingham (1783–1849), who, at the age of 15, was briefly married to a French aristocrat, Jacques Alexandre, Comte de Tilly. Afterwards she married her sister's brother-in-law, Henry Baring. They were the parents of five children. Maria and Henry were divorced in 1824; she married the Marquis de Blaisel in 1826.
- William Bingham (1800–1852), who married Marie-Charlotte Chartier de Lotbiniere (1805–1866), Seigneuresse de Rigaud, in 1822. Marie-Charlotte was the second of the three daughters and heiresses of Michel-Eustache-Gaspard-Alain Chartier de Lotbinière, by his second wife Mary, daughter of Capt. John Munro. They lived in Montreal, Paris and London; and were the parents of six children. William Bingham settled in England and died in Kent in 1852.

A few weeks after having given birth to her last child, Bingham fell ill of "galloping consumption" and left for Madeira, but died en route in Bermuda, where she is buried in the Saint Peter's Church Graveyard. Her husband continued to Europe and died of a stroke in England in 1804.

== Notes ==
- The Golden Voyage: The Life and Times of William Bingham, 1762–1804 by Robert C. Alberts, Houghton-Mifflin, 1969
