= Will (surname) =

Will is a surname found in the English-speaking world.

People with this surname include:

- Clifford Martin Will (born 1946), Canadian-born mathematical physicist
- Conrad Will (politician) (1779–1835), American physician, politician, and pioneer
- Conrad Will (triathlete) (1941–2002), American early pioneer in the sport of triathlon
- George Will (born 1941), American conservative writer
- Nathaniël Will (born 1989), Dutch footballer

== See also ==
- Will (disambiguation)
