= Mount Willing =

Mount Willing may refer to the following:

== Antarctica ==
- Mount Willing, Antarctica, a mountain in the Prince Charles Mountains

== United States ==
- Mount Willing, Alabama
- Mount Willing, South Carolina, a populated place and former cotton plantation in Saluda County, South Carolina
