= John Nixon (financier) =

American financier and militia officer (1733–1808)

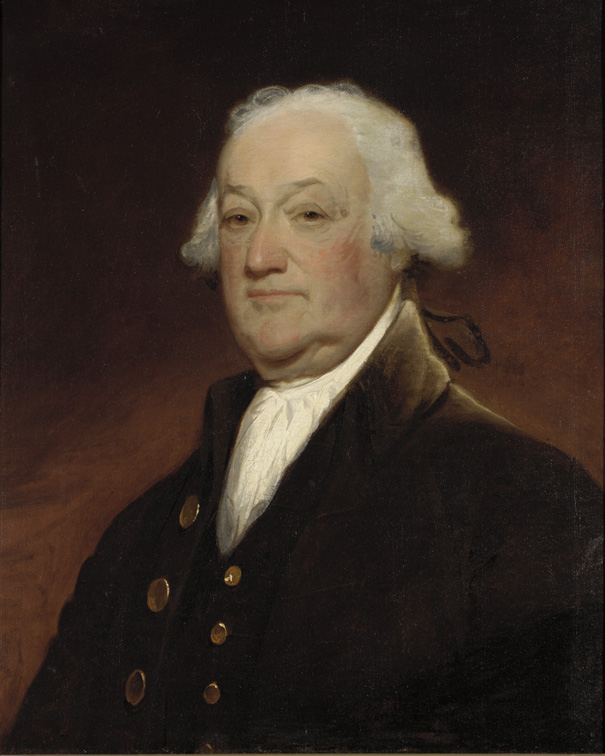
- portrait by Gilbert Stuart
- Born: 1733; Philadelphia
- Died: December 31, 1808; Philadelphia
- Resting place: St. Peter's Churchyard
- Occupation: Banker
- Children: Henry Nixon

John Nixon (1733 – December 31, 1808) was a financier and official from Philadelphia who served as a militia officer in the American Revolutionary War. On July 8, 1776, he made the first public proclamation of the Declaration of Independence, reading it from the steps of Pennsylvania State House, now Independence Hall in Philadelphia.

== Early life ==
Nixon was born in Philadelphia, in the Province of Pennsylvania in British America, in 1733, the son of a shipping merchant.

== Career ==
Following passage of the Stamp Act in 1765, Nixon signed the non-importation agreement against the Act, became active in opposing the encroachments of the English government upon American liberties, and was a member of the first committee of correspondence in the colonial era Province of Pennsylvania.

In April 1775, he became lieutenant-colonel of the third battalion of the Philadelphia Associators, a Patriot militia unit. He was also a member of the Committee of Safety. From May to July 1776, he commanded the Continental Army's defenses of the Delaware River at Fort Island, and was then put in charge of the defenses of Philadelphia, which was then the colonial capital and the meeting place of the revolutionary Second Continental Congress.

In 1776, Nixon was promoted colonel and later served under George Washington at the Battle of Princeton. He became a member of the Navy Board, and two years later was with Washington again during the harsh winter at Valley Forge from 1777 to 1778.

In 1780, he became a director of the Bank of Pennsylvania and later assisted in organizing the Bank of North America, where he served as president from 1792 until his death.

== Death ==
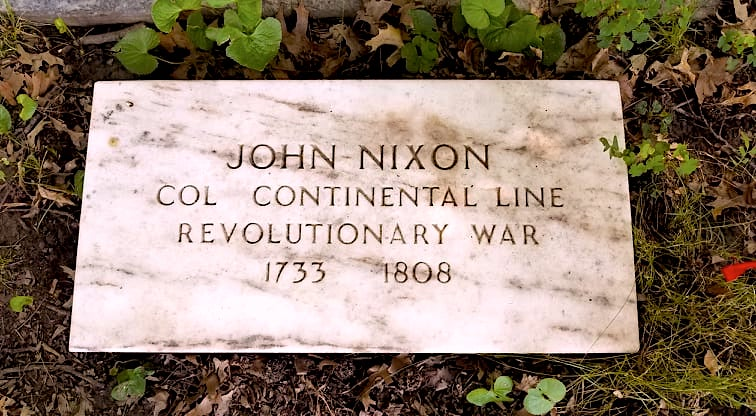
Nixon's gravestone at St. Peter's Church in Philadelphia

Nixon died on December 31, 1808, and was interred in the churchyard of St. Peter's Church in Philadelphia.

== Biographical sketch ==
NIXON, John, soldier, was born in Philadelphia, Pa., in 1733. His father was a wealthy shipping merchant who left his son his business at his death in 1756. John Nixon was among those who signed the non-importation agreement of 1765, from which time on he was one of the leaders of the patriot cause in Philadelphia. He was a member of the first committee of correspondence and of the committee of public safety, served in the provincial conventions of 1774 and 1775, and in April. 1775, was chosen lieutenant-colonel of the 3rd Philadelphia battalion. In May, 1776, he commanded the defences of the Delaware, from which he was transferred in July, 1776, and was assigned to the command of the city guard of Philadelphia. He was the first to read the declaration of independence to an assemblage of citizens after its adoption. In the summer of 1776 his battalion served at Amboy. In the following December, Nixon, having in the meantime succeeded to the chief command, reinforced Washington at Trenton and participated in the battle of Princeton. In 1776 Nixon served on the navy board and in 1778 he spent the winter at Valley Forge. When a bank to provision the army was formed in 1780 he became its first director. He was also one of the founders of the Bank of North America, established in 1783, and its president from 1792 until his death, which occurred December 31, 1808.
