= The Will (Six Feet Under) =

- Six Feet Under episode
- Episode no.: Season 1 Episode 2
- Directed by: Miguel Arteta
- Written by: Christian Williams
- Cinematography by: Bruce Douglas Johnson
- Editing by: Christopher Nelson
- Original release date: June 10, 2001
- Running time: 52 minutes

Guest appearances
- Ed Begley Jr. as Hiram Gunderson; Richard Jenkins as Nathaniel Fisher Sr.; Tracy Middendorf as Adele Swanson

Episode chronology
← Previous "Pilot"	Next → "The Foot"

"The Will" is the second episode of the first season of the American drama television series Six Feet Under. The episode was written by co-executive producer Christian Williams, and directed by Miguel Arteta. It originally aired on HBO on June 10, 2001.

The series is set in Los Angeles, and depicts the lives of the Fisher family, who run a funeral home, along with their friends and lovers. It explores the conflicts that arise after the family's patriarch, Nathaniel, dies in a car accident. In the episode, the Fishers are informed of Nathaniel's testimony, causing friction in the family.

According to Nielsen Media Research, the episode was seen by an estimated 3.89 million household viewers and gained Nielsen household rating of 2.5. The episode received positive reviews from critics, who praised the performances, themes and directing.

== Plot ==
At his house, Chandler Swanson (Mark Devine) invites some of his partners to invest in Beauty Vision, a life-management system. He subsequently jumps into his pool, but his family is horrified when they realize he died by hitting his head at the bottom of the pool.

Chandler's widow Adele (Tracy Middendorf) meets with David Fisher (Michael C. Hall) to arrange his funeral. He convinces her in buying a specific casket, but her credit card is blocked. Afterwards, the family attends the reading of Nathaniel's will, where Nathaniel left his money and shares to Claire (Lauren Ambrose), but she is angry that she must either go to college or wait until she is 25 years old to get her inheritance. He also left Fisher & Sons in 50% equity to both David and Nate (Peter Krause). This upsets David, as he worked harder than Nate on the funeral home. The situation worsens when Nate is tasked with delivering a body, but he stops for two hours to dine with Brenda (Rachel Griffiths), causing the body's condition to deteriorate.

Ruth (Frances Conroy) is frustrated with her sons' fight, and goes on a hiking trip with her boyfriend Hiram (Ed Begley, Jr.). This gives her the opportunity to reflect on her life, and decides to leave the funeral business to David and Nate. The Fishers discover that Adele will not be able to afford the expenses; Chandler's business venture was a pyramid scheme, leaving her with so many debts at his name. Seeing her situation, Nate privately decides to rent her a casket, which goes against the funeral home's procedures. Feeling lost with her life, Claire decides to hang out with Gabe (Eric Balfour), smoking marijuana as she tries to deal with her mother's behavior.

David is surprised by the sudden arrival of his ex-finacée, Jennifer (Missy Yager), who offers her condolences for his father's death. Despite having agreed to meet with Keith (Mathew St. Patrick) and his friends, David decides to go dining with Jennifer to open up about his relationship with his father. When he visits Keith's apartment drunk, Keith does not allow him to enter, as he found out where he actually went. Later, as David and Nate have another argument, they are called by Brenda, who wants to meet them at a bus stop. The bus is revealed to be the same one that killed Nathaniel, causing David to break down.

== Production ==
=== Development ===
The episode was written by co-executive producer Christian Williams, and directed by Miguel Arteta. This was Williams' first writing credit, and Arteta's first directing credit.

== Reception ==
=== Viewers ===
In its original American broadcast, "The Will" was seen by an estimated 3.89 million household viewers with a household rating of 2.5. This means that it was seen by 2.5% of the nation's estimated households, and was watched by 2.59 million households. This was a 22% decrease in viewership from the previous episode, which was watched by 4.97 million household viewers with a household rating of 3.6.

=== Critical reviews ===
"The Will" received positive reviews from critics. John Teti of The A.V. Club wrote, "One of the great things about Six Feet Under is that way that the characters' underlying dissatisfaction can explode at the most unexpected moments. What a shocking exchange between Ruth and David mid-episode. [...] Jesus! The energy of the room changes immediately, but it's not cheap. It feels justified."

Entertainment Weekly gave the episode a "B+" grade, and wrote, "Though the pacing is a little poky because the characters are still being fleshed out, the episode effectively sets up one of Six's central conflicts: the clash between dutiful son David and reluctant partner Nate." Mark Zimmer of Digitally Obsessed gave the episode a 4 out of 5 rating.

TV Tome gave the episode a 9 out of 10 rating and wrote "Better than the first episode? Hard to say but definitely on a par." Billie Doux of Doux Reviews gave the episode 3 out of 4 stars and wrote "What was interesting was that, while Nate made some serious boners (like having his and Brenda's "first date" while Fisher and Sons' latest client rotted away in the parking lot), Nate showed that he might actually have some talent for the business that he ran away from his entire life." Television Without Pity gave the episode a "C+" grade.

In 2016, Ross Bonaime of Paste ranked it 28th out of all 63 Six Feet Under episodes and wrote, "The reading of Nathaniel's will causes everyone to question what his true intentions were. Nate gains half a company that he never wanted and David has to share the business he's worked his whole life towards, creating new problems within the already troubled family dynamic. But “The Will” is all about the healing process, as Nate and David bond over their grief, while Ruth embraces being single for the first time since she was a teenager. The wounds aren't going to go away anytime soon, but the process is slowly working its way through the Fishers."
