= Willing Expedition =

The Willing Expedition, also called Willing's Depredation, was a 1778 military expedition launched on behalf of the American Continental Congress by Captain James Willing during the American War of Independence.

== Background ==
James Willing was a former Natchez resident who had achieved the rank of Captain in the Continental Navy. He visited Baton Rouge in 1777 bringing an offer from the Continental Congress for West Florida to join the rebellion against the British Crown and a proposal to become the fourteenth state. Although some West Floridians had sympathy with the cause of the American independence, most were content with their situation which included an elected assembly, and were far more concerned about the Spanish presence in nearby New Orleans from which they required British protection.

Willing reported back to Congress that West Florida was a threat to American independence and was authorized to take a force of troops down the Mississippi River and compel the settlers to take an oath of neutrality. The principle backer of the scheme was Robert Morris, whose decision to endorse Willing's plan proved controversial. He advanced south along the Mississippi River into West Florida. After occupying Natchez and plundering the nearby plantations, Willing was eventually defeated by a force of Loyalists and was later captured by the British.

== British raids ==
Willing assembled a small militia and began raiding British outposts. Willing and his militia occupied Natchez on February 19, 1778, and announced that a 5,000 strong militia under George Rogers Clark was following him down the river. He received tacit cooperation from Bernardo de Gálvez, the Governor of Spanish Luisiana and Commander of the troops of his Catholic Majesty. Galvez cooperated because he believed that if West Florida were captured, it would then be handed over to Spain. The militia reached Fort Bute and captured a British vessel there. Willing then advanced southward, but many of the local settlers crossed the river and took shelter on the Spanish side. He forced a committee of local landowners to pledge they would not take up arms against the army of the United States.

== Aftermath ==
In response to Willing's raid the British dispatched more troops to the area, part of a wider plan to redistribute troops to the Gulf of Mexico following the entry of France into the war.

== Bibliography ==
- Meyes, Rose. A History of Baton Rouge 1699-1812.
- Bemis, Samuel Flagg. The Diplomacy of the American Revolution.
- Charles, Rappleye. Robert Morris: Financier of the American Revolution.
