= James Willing =

American naval captain (1750–1801)

- Born: 1750; Philadelphia, Province of Pennsylvania, British America
- Died: 1801 (aged 50–51)
- Occupation: Merchant
- Known for: Willing Expedition
- Parent(s): Charles Willing; Anne Shippen Willing
- Relatives: Thomas Willing (brother)

James Willing (1750–1801) was a representative of the American Continental Congress who led a 1778 military expedition during the American Revolutionary War. Known as the Willing Expedition, the effort involved raiding British forts, plantations, and other properties of loyalists in the colonial British West Florida settlement of Natchez. Later that year, he sought protection from the British by hiding out in New Orleans, but was taken prisoner by them on his attempt to return to Philadelphia.

== Early life ==
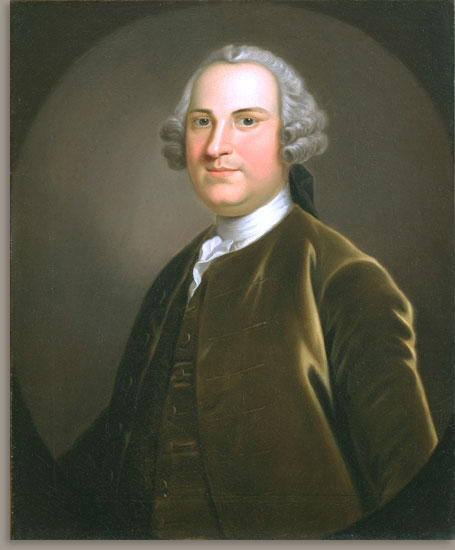
Portrait of Charles Willing, James' father, by John Wollaston

James Willing came from a prominent family in Philadelphia. His father was Charles Willing, who twice served as mayor of Philadelphia, and his mother Anne Shippen was the granddaughter of Edward Shippen, who was the second mayor of Philadelphia. His older brother Thomas Willing was an American merchant and a delegate to the Continental Congress from Pennsylvania, and the first president of the First Bank of the United States.

In his early life, Willing was a merchant and operated a general store in the colonial British West Florida settlement of Natchez. During the American Revolution, the majority of the population of Natchez remained loyal to the British crown. Willing was not a successful merchant and returned to Philadelphia, where he was commissioned as a naval captain in the Continental Navy.

== Willing Expedition ==
In 1777, as a representative of the Continental Congress, Willing traveled to Natchez to try to convince the residents to join the American movement for independence. While he was graciously received, his proposal was rejected. The landowners were indebted to the king for granting them property and allowing them a form of representative government. Willing reported back to the Continental Congress that "West Florida was a serious threat to the cause of independence".

Oliver Pollock and Bernardo de Gálvez, the Governor of Spanish Louisiana and Commander of the troops of his Catholic Majesty began organizing military raids against British West Florida and sent over US$70,000 worth of munitions to Fort Pitt. Pollock received a letter from Robert Morris and William Smith who were members of the Committee of Secret Correspondence stating that Willing would be leading an expedition against loyalist settlements along the river above New Orleans. Pollock and George Rogers Clark raised funds to financially support the military expedition. Willing along with twenty-nine men of the 13th Virginia Regiment left Fort Pitt on January 11, 1778 and sailed down the Ohio River on board the gunboat USS Rattletrap.

Willing and his party reached Natchez on February 19, 1778, and began raiding British forts, plantations, and other properties of British loyalists. On February 21, Willing forced the residents of Natchez to take an oath of allegiance to the United States of America. Those who swore the oath (the signatories included William Hiern, Charles Percy, and plantation owner Samuel Wells) agreed not to take up arms against the United States of America, in exchange for assurances that the people they enslaved would not be seized nor freed, and that Willing would treat with Choctaws nearby to prevent attacks. Willing continued to plunder and raid the countryside during the period known as the Willing Expedition. He and his party looted property with an estimated worth of $1.5 million. By May 24 his efforts were exhausted and he retreated to New Orleans for protection from the British.

A few months after this, Pollock paid for Willing to return to Philadelphia by ship, but Willing's ship was intercepted by the British off the coast of Delaware. He was taken prisoner and held in New York. It is unclear how long he was held. DuVal says he was held for "a year or so", while Haynes asserts that the British conducted a prisoner exchange on September 3, 1781, exchanging Willing for a captured British officer. However, a note on Willing's company's muster roll in 1782 indicates that Willing was absent, suggesting that he was still a prisoner of the British.

Willing was living in Haverford Township, Pennsylvania, at the end of his life. He died there in 1801. According to his will, he had an illegitimate daughter named Elizabeth, by a Natchez woman named Mary Ruth.

== Sources ==
- "Expedition of Captain James Willing". The American Monthly Magazine. 20. The National Society. 1902.
- DeRosier, Arthur H. Jr. (2015). William Dunbar: Scientific Pioneer of the Old Southwest. University Press of Kentucky. ISBN 9780813157672.
- DuVal, Kathleen (2016). Independence Lost: Lives on the Edge of the American Revolution. Random House. ISBN 978-0-8129-8120-9.
- James, D. Clayton (May 1, 1993) [1968]. Antebellum Natchez. LSU Press. ISBN 978-0-8071-1860-3.
- Haynes, Robert V. (2011). The Natchez District and the American Revolution. University Press of Mississippi. ISBN 9781617032394.
- Meyers, Rose (1999). History of Baton Rouge, 1699–1812. LSU Press. ISBN 9780807124314.
- Piecuch, Jim (2013). Three Peoples, One King: Loyalists, Indians, and Slaves in the American Revolutionary South, 1775–1782. University of South Carolina Press. ISBN 978-1-61117-193-8.
- Powell, Lawrence N. (2012). The Accidental City. Harvard University Press. ISBN 978-0-674-06544-4.
- Rappleye, Charles (2010). Robert Morris: Financier of the American Revolution. New York: Simon & Schuster. pp. 289–488. ISBN 978-1416570912.
