= Bank of North America =

American bank established in 1781

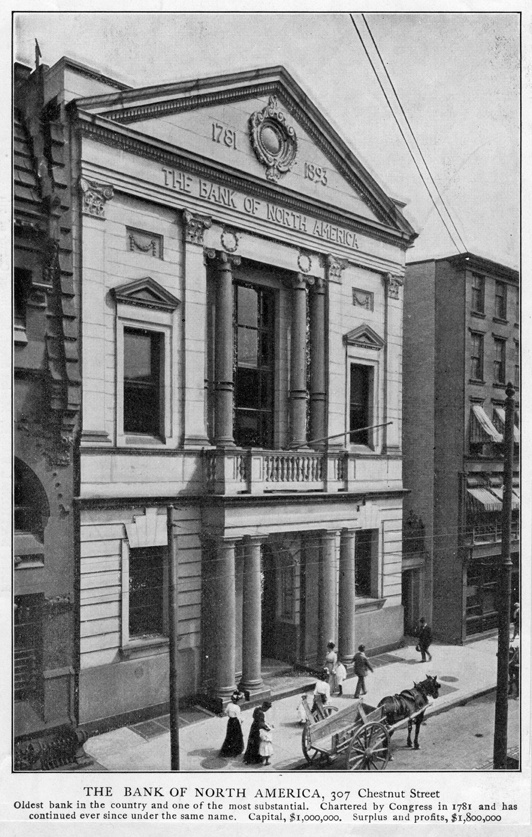
- Bank of North America's original location at 307 Chestnut Street in Philadelphia
- Type: Public (1781–1785); Private (1785–1929)
- Industry: Financial services
- Founded: December 31, 1781, in Philadelphia, Pennsylvania
- Founders: Robert Morris, Alexander Hamilton, William Bingham, and others
- Fate: Merger
- Successor: Pennsylvania Company for Insurances on Lives and Granting Annuities (1929); Wells Fargo (2008)
- Headquarters: Philadelphia, Pennsylvania, United States
- Area served: United States
- Key people: Thomas Willing (president 1781–1792); Tench Francis Jr. (cashier)

The Bank of North America was the first chartered bank in the United States, and served as the country's first de facto central bank. It was chartered by the Congress of the Confederation on May 26, 1781, and opened in Philadelphia, Pennsylvania, on January 7, 1782.

The bank's establishment was based on a plan presented by Superintendent of Finance Robert Morris on May 17, 1781, including recommendations by Revolutionary-era Founding Father Alexander Hamilton, who was later appointed the first U.S. secretary of the treasury by George Washington. Although Hamilton later noted the bank's "essential" contribution to the American Revolutionary War, the Pennsylvania government objected to its privileges and reincorporated it under state law, making it unsuitable as a national bank under the U.S. Constitution. Congress instead chartered the First Bank of the United States, a new bank, in 1791, while the Bank of North America continued as a private concern.

== Revolutionary war period ==
=== Congressional charter ===
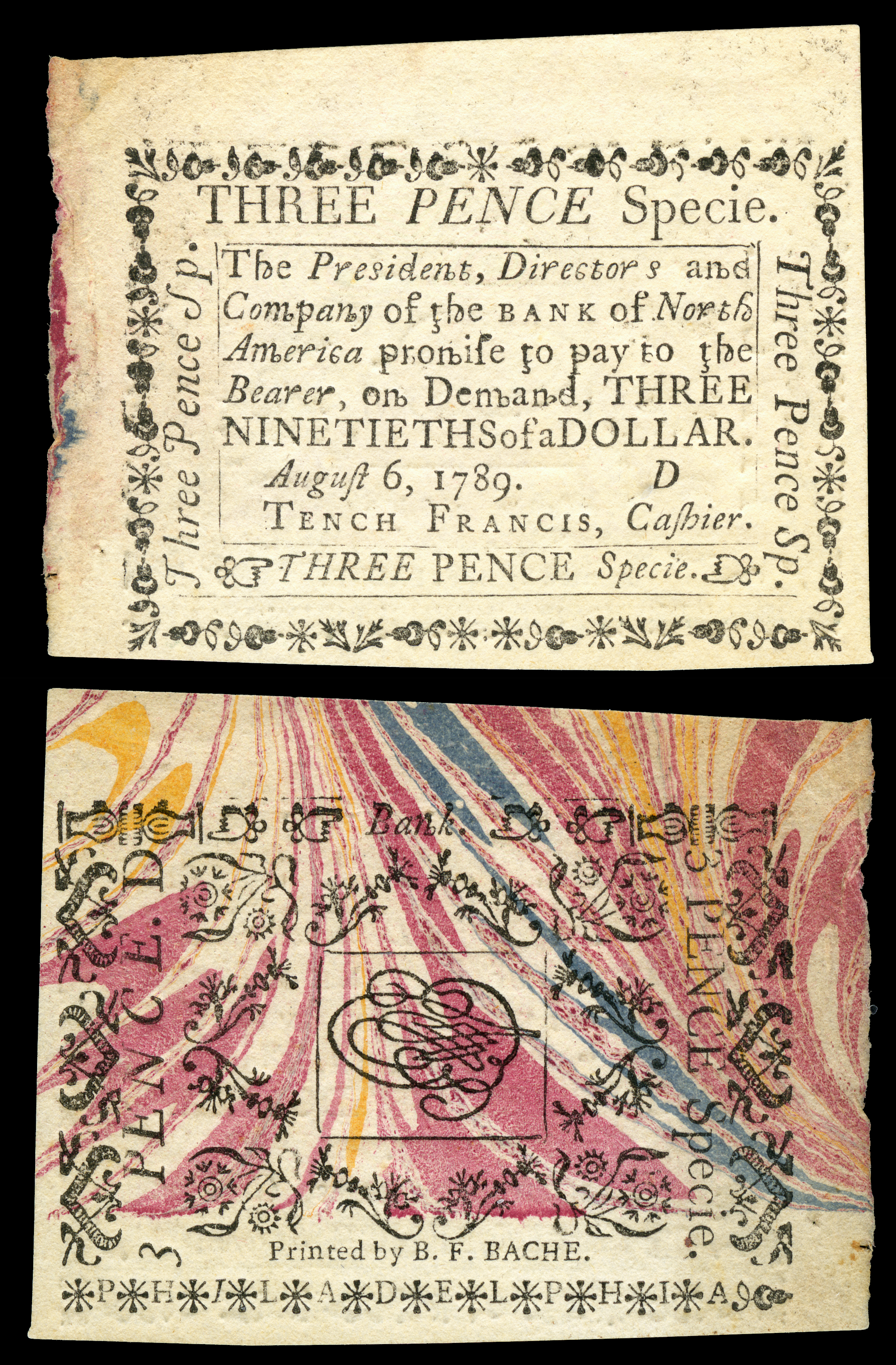
Three pence issued by the Bank of North America on August 6, 1789, printed by Benjamin Franklin Bache on marbled paper obtained by Benjamin Franklin.

In May 1781, Alexander Hamilton revealed that he had recommended Robert Morris for the position of Superintendent of Finance of the United States the previous summer when the constitution of the Articles of Confederation-era executive was being solidified. He also proceeded to lay out a proposal for a national bank that would serve as a de facto central bank.

Morris corresponded with Hamilton previously on the subject of funding the war, and immediately drafted a legislative proposal based on Hamilton's suggestion and submitted it to the Congress. Morris persuaded Congress to charter the Bank of North America, the first private commercial bank in the United States. His friend, Dr. Hugh Shiell, paid £5000 to the capital stock.

=== Stock offering ===
The original charter as outlined by Hamilton called for the disbursement of 1,000 shares priced at $400 each. Benjamin Franklin purchased a single token share as a sign of good faith to Federalists and their new bank. Hamilton used his pseudonym "Publius", later immortalized in the Federalist Papers advocating in the late 1780s for adoption of the United States Constitution, to endorse the bank.

William Bingham, rumored to be the richest man in America after the Revolutionary War, purchased 9.5% of the available shares. The greatest share, however, 63.3%, was purchased on behalf of the United States government by Robert Morris, using a gift in the form of a loan from France and a loan from Netherlands. This had the effect of capitalizing the bank with large deposits of gold and silver coin and bills of exchange. He then issued new paper currency backed by this supply.

=== Officers ===
Thomas Willing, who served two terms as mayor of Philadelphia and was a partner with Morris in an import-export firm that once dominated the city's slave trade, was named the bank's first president. He held that office from 1781 to 1791, being succeeded by John Nixon, and moving immediately on to become the first president of the First Bank of the United States, a position he held from 1791 to 1807.

=== Banknotes ===
The bank issued its own notes that superseded the troubled Continental currency bills. These notes were printed on paper with colored fibers pressed into the reverse side as an anti-counterfeiting measure. Unlike the Continental bills, the new notes carried a promise to pay silver on demand. Despite these changes, the bank had difficulty at first persuading people of its good credit, and at one point it employed repossessors to follow people who redeemed notes and urge them to deposit the money back. To promote the impression that it had a large reserve, the bank made a show of moving cash boxes to and from its cellar. Once the stock was fully subscribed and paid, doubts subsided and the notes rose to par value. By 1783, several states including Massachusetts enacted legislation allowing Americans to pay taxes with Bank of North America notes, giving them a crucial aspect of legal tender.

== Private bank ==
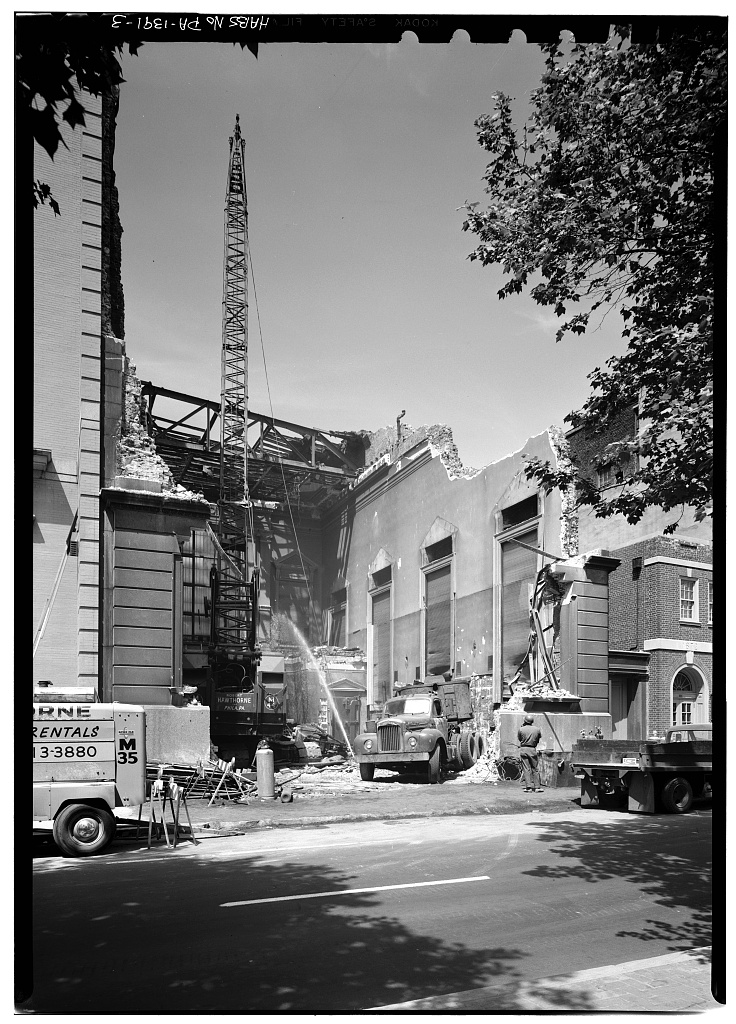
Demolishing the Bank of North America's building at 305–307 Chestnut Street in Philadelphia, c. 1959

In the economic turmoil that followed the American Revolutionary War, the bank's strictness in collecting debts drew opposition from Pennsylvania residents, who petitioned the Pennsylvania General Assembly to revoke the state charter granted to it in 1782. The charter was revoked in 1785, although the bank continued to operate with difficulty under its congressional charter and then under a Delaware charter. The following year, the Pennsylvania General Assembly granted a new charter with several restrictions, including that it could not trade any merchandise other than bullion. The Bank of North America, First Bank of the United States, and Bank of New York were the first shares traded on the New York Stock Exchange.

After the passage of the National Bank Act in 1862, the Bank of North America converted its business to operate under the new law. Its unique history presented a problem: the act required a national bank to include the word "national" in its name. The bank's management considered its original name a matter of prestige and took the position that the name remained fixed by the Confederation and state charters. The Comptroller of the Currency chose not to press these legal questions and admitted the bank without a name change.

The bank merged in 1923 with the Commercial Trust Company to become the Bank of North America and Trust Company, which merged in 1929 with the Pennsylvania Company for Insurances on Lives and Granting Annuities. That company, operating as the Pennsylvania Company for Banking and Trust, merged with the First National Bank in 1955 to become The First Pennsylvania Banking and Trust Company, which was acquired by CoreStates Financial Corporation in 1991, by First Union/Wachovia in 1998, and by Wells Fargo in 2008.

The original Bank of North America building at 305-307 Chestnut Street was demolished c. 1959, preceding the modern historic preservation movement that came in the following decade. The site is now occupied by the Science History Institute Museum and Library.

== See also ==
- Congressional charter
- Turner v. Bank of North America (1799)
