= Westworld: Season 2 (soundtrack) =

Soundtrack album by Ramin Djawadi
- Released: June 25, 2018
- Genre: Soundtrack
- Length: 99:16
- Label: WaterTower Music
- Producer: Ramin Djawadi

Ramin Djawadi soundtracks chronology
A Wrinkle in Time (2018)	Westworld: Season 2 (2018)	Game of Thrones: Season 8 (2019)

Singles from Westworld: Season 2
- 1. "Runaway" Released: February 5, 2018; 2. "Heart-Shaped Box" Released: March 29, 2018; 3. "Seven Nation Army" Released: May 6, 2018; 4. "Paint It, Black" Released: May 20, 2018; 5. "C.R.E.A.M." Released: May 20, 2018

Westworld: Season 2 is the second soundtrack of the American television series Westworld, composed by Ramin Djawadi. Released on June 25, 2018, the day after the season finale aired, the album includes 29 pieces composed for the show. Comprising mostly original compositions by Djawadi, the album also includes more cover versions of modern songs, with adaptations of tracks released by Kanye West, The White Stripes, Nirvana, Wu-Tang Clan and Radiohead, plus a second arrangement of The Rolling Stones' "Paint It Black".

== Background ==
Djawadi has explained that the use of seemingly-anachronistic cover versions is intended as "a subconscious reminder of the fact that this world is not real". Having originally come up with the idea of using a player piano to play modern songs, as an allusion to the hosts being machines "created to evoke human emotion", showrunner Jonathan Nolan chooses songs that relate to the narrative, for Djawadi to adapt, without the composer necessarily knowing the details.

With season 2 showing viewers other parks run by Delos, Djawadi was given the opportunity to experiment with South- and East-Asian sounds, for "The Raj" and "Shōgunworld". Using The White Stripes's "Seven Nation Army" to introduce The Raj, a British Raj-themed park, and show that it is a Westernized fantasy, Djawadi found it difficult "to master the intonation", playing the melody on a sitar. The Rolling Stones' "Paint It Black" had been used for a heist scene in season 1 and was adapted again, using taiko drums and shakuhachi flutes for a shot-for-shot remake of the heist scene, to show the parallels between Westworld and early-modern Japan-themed Shōgunworld. The adaptation of Kanye West's "Runaway" was used in the first trailer for season 2, with cacophonous, discordant sounds overwhelming the piano and strings "represent[ing] how quickly things can fall apart now that the park has gone wrong".

While starting each adaptation with a "piano reduction", much as he did when arranging songs as a teen, Djawadi created both a "big orchestral arrangement" of Nirvana's "Heart-Shaped Box" for the series' second trailer, before adapting that back down to a slower piano version for a more emotional scene in the episode "Kiksuya". Djawadi has spoken of his respect for Kurt Cobain as a composer and songwriter: "Even without lyrics and just the melody and how recognizable the piece is, it's actually quite incredible how [Heart-Shaped Box] holds up in an orchestral setting like this".

Several pieces share titles with episode names: episodes 1 "Journey into Night", 3 "Virtù e Fortuna" ("Virtue and Fortune" in Italian—a reference to Niccolò Machiavelli), 5 "Akane no Mai" (Japanese for "Akane's Dance", Akane being a character in Shōgunworld), 7 "Les Écorchés" ("The Flayed [people]" in French—a reference to écorché, a style of artwork depicting the human body without skin), 8 "Kiksuya" (Lakota for "Remember") and 9 "Vanishing Point".

== Track listing ==
All music by Ramin Djawadi, except where noted.

No.	Title	Key scenes/Notes	Length
1.	"Main Title Theme - Westworld"	Used for the opening credits sequence.	1:41
2.	"Journey into Night"	"Journey into Night"	5:29
3.	"Runaway"	"Reunion": The track is a piano arrangement of the song of the same name by Kanye West.	2:48
4.	"Myself"	"Journey into Night"	4:02
5.	"The Entertainer"	"Journey into Night": This track is an orchestral rearrangement of the classic rag of the same name by Scott Joplin.	1:06
6.	"Is This Now?"	"Journey into Night"	4:23
7.	"Seven Nation Army"	"Virtù e Fortuna": The track is a sitar arrangement of the song of the same name by The White Stripes.	2:12
8.	"The Raj"	"Virtù e Fortuna": The track features an Indian-influenced rendition of "Sweetwater".	2:47
9.	"Les Écorchés"	"Virtù e Fortuna"	4:12
10.	"Heart-Shaped Box" (orchestral)	It was used in the second trailer for this season. The track is an orchestral arrangement of the song of the same name by Nirvana.	3:24
11.	"Akane no Mai"	"Akane no Mai"	3:33
12.	"Paint It, Black"	"Akane no Mai": The track is a Japanese-influenced rendition of the song of the same name by The Rolling Stones.	5:42
13.	"C.R.E.A.M."	"Akane no Mai": The track is a Japanese-influenced rendition of the song of the same name by Wu-Tang Clan.	1:46
14.	"Virtù e Fortuna"	"Les Écorchés"	2:18
15.	"A New Voice"	"Phase Space"	3:30
16.	"Kiksuya"	"Kiksuya"	3:23
17.	"I Remember You"	"Kiksuya"	5:22
18.	"Heart-Shaped Box" (piano)	"Kiksuya": The track is a piano arrangement of the song of the same name by Nirvana.	1:24
19.	"Take My Heart When You Go"	"Kiksuya"	4:10
20.	"Virus"	"The Passenger"	2:52
21.	"My Favorite"	"Vanishing Point"	3:35
22.	"Vanishing Point"	"Vanishing Point"	3:01
23.	"My Speech"	"The Passenger"	1:17
24.	"A Passage to Another World"	"The Passenger"	4:14
25.	"I Promise"	"Kiksuya"	4:34
26.	"Core Drive"	"Les Écorchés"	3:53
27.	"Westworld"	"The Passenger"	5:21
28.	"Codex"	"The Passenger": The track is an orchestral arrangement of the song of the same name by Radiohead.	3:34
29.	"We'll Meet Again"	"The Passenger"	3:10
Total length:			99:16

== Reception and accolades ==
The soundtrack received favorable reviews and peaked at number 23 on the U.S. Billboard 200 chart. Writing for SoundtrackDreams.com, Mihnea Manduteanu described "A New Voice" as being a "pivotal cue ... played with soft, Asian strings, the searing way in which those strings are played, it's another piece that shows how much care the composer had for Maeve and her arc in this season". The score for the episode "Akane no Mai" was nominated for the Outstanding Music Composition for a Series Emmy, but was beaten by Djawadi's own score for the Game of Thrones episode "The Dragon and the Wolf".

=== Charts ===
Chart (2018)	Peak position
Belgian Albums (Ultratop Wallonia)	199
UK Soundtrack Albums (Official Charts)	22
US Billboard 200	23

=== Awards and nominations ===
Year	Award	Category	Nominee(s)	Result	Ref.
2018	70th Primetime Creative Arts Emmy Awards	Outstanding Music Composition for a Series (Original Dramatic Score)	"Akane no Mai"	Nominated	

== See also ==
- Piano roll
- Ragtime
