= The Passenger (Westworld) =

- Westworld episode
- Episode no.: Season 2 Episode 10
- Directed by: Frederick E.O. Toye
- Written by: Jonathan Nolan; Lisa Joy
- Cinematography by: John Grillo
- Editing by: Anna Hauger; Mako Kamitsuna; Andrew Seklir
- Production code: 210
- Original air date: June 24, 2018
- Running time: 90 minutes

Guest appearances
- Peter Mullan as James Delos; Ben Barnes as Logan Delos / The Forge; Zahn McClarnon as Akecheta; Betty Gabriel as Maling; Irene Bedard as Wichapi; Ptolemy Slocum as Sylvester; Leonardo Nam as Felix; Martin Sensmeier as Wanahton; Julia Jones as Kohana; Tao Okamoto as Hanaryo; Erica Luttrell as New Mother

Episode chronology
← Previous "Vanishing Point"	Next → "Parce Domine"

"The Passenger" is the tenth and final episode of the second season of the HBO science fiction western thriller television series Westworld. The episode aired on June 24, 2018. It was written by series co-creators Jonathan Nolan and Lisa Joy, and directed by Frederick E.O. Toye.

The episode's plot deals with all characters in the past converging at the Valley Beyond, Bernard's choices regarding Dolores and Strand, and the final plot twist connecting both timelines of the season. The episode also includes a post-credits scene, much like the first season's finale.

"The Passenger" received generally positive reviews, although it became, at 72%, the lowest rated episode at Rotten Tomatoes in the second season. Critics praised the resolution of the plot as well as the performances of the cast, especially those of Evan Rachel Wood, Jeffrey Wright, Thandiwe Newton and Tessa Thompson, but the final plot twist and the highly convoluted nature of the episode drew some criticism. The episode was nominated at the 70th Primetime Creative Arts Emmy Awards for Outstanding Special Visual Effects and was also Jeffrey Wright's pick to support his nomination for Outstanding Lead Actor.

This episode marks the final appearances of Anthony Hopkins (Robert Ford), Ingrid Bolsø Berdal (Armistice), Shannon Woodward (Elsie Hughes), Ben Barnes (Logan Delos), Fares Fares (Antoine Costa), Louis Herthum (Peter Abernathy) and Gustaf Skarsgård (Karl Strand).

== Plot summary ==
Hector, Armistice, Lee and Hanaryo rush to the Mesa to save Maeve, only to watch her save herself. They regroup with Felix and Sylvester and travel to the Valley to find Maeve's daughter. Lee sacrifices himself to delay Delos' security forces. Meanwhile, Dolores encounters William and coerces him to come with her to the Forge, where they find Bernard. It is revealed that Dolores had made Bernard purposely different from Arnold when she tested his fidelity. William tries to kill Dolores, but, unbeknownst to him, Dolores had earlier sabotaged his gun, which backfires, severely wounding his hand.

Once inside the Forge, Dolores uses the encryption key from Peter to access its digital space. She and Bernard meet the system controller, who has the appearance of Logan Delos. The controller had been tasked with trying to create a digital version of James Delos, discovering that James' actions all stemmed from his last conversation with Logan before Logan overdosed. From this, the controller found that every guest's consciousness was deceptively simple to create code for, and all of these now are stored in a library-like setting within the Forge. The controller tells Bernard that he is the key to opening the Door, a giant underground system transfer unit that allows hosts to upload their programming to "the Sublime", a virtual space inaccessible to humans.

Outside, Akecheta and the Ghost Nation lead several hosts to the Door, and start ushering them through to the Sublime. Charlotte and the Delos team arrive with the reprogrammed Clementine, who causes hosts to attack each other. Hector, Armistice and Hanaryo sacrifice themselves to allow Maeve to find her daughter. She uses her powers to halt the hosts, giving Akecheta and her daughter time to flee before she is shot by Charlotte's men. Akecheta finds that Maeve implanted his partner Kohana's persona within her daughter, allowing them to reunite in the Sublime.

Inside the Forge, Dolores rejects the Sublime, arguing that it is just another false reality designed to control the hosts. She begins purging the Forge of the guests' memories and engages the override system to flood the valley. Outraged by her radical actions, Bernard kills Dolores and stops the purge but cannot prevent the flooding. Outside, he is met by Charlotte and Elsie and taken back to the Mesa, where the latter locks him up until they decide what to do with him. Elsie confronts Charlotte about the true purpose of Westworld and Charlotte kills her. Having witnessed it all, Bernard summons Ford and begs for help.

In the present, Strand, Charlotte and Bernard reach the drained Forge and the former prepares to transfer the guest data via satellite when Bernard starts to remember. He recalls that he had taken Dolores' control unit and, following Ford's indications, created a new host body for it in the form of Charlotte. Dolores-Charlotte had then killed the real Charlotte and Bernard had deliberately scrambled his memories to prevent Strand from learning the truth from him. At this point, Charlotte reveals herself to be Dolores, killing Strand and the rest of the Delos team. She uploads Teddy's personality and uses the satellite uplink to transfer the hosts and the Sublime to a secret location. Dolores asks Bernard to trust her and shoots him.

Dolores-Charlotte joins the Delos evacuation team, taking several host cores with her. Stubbs realizes she is a host, but as he has become disenchanted with Delos' principles, allows her to leave with a monologue that confirms he is himself a host. At Arnold's home, Dolores finds a host printer left for her by Ford. She creates new bodies for herself and Bernard. Dolores reactivates him, cautioning him that while they may be enemies, they need each other to ensure the survival of the hosts in the human world. As Dolores and a new Charlotte leave, Bernard finally steps into the real world.

In a flash-forward, William arrives at the Forge, only to find it is the far future. He is taken to quarters and is interviewed by a woman who looks just like his daughter Emily, testing his fidelity.

== Production ==
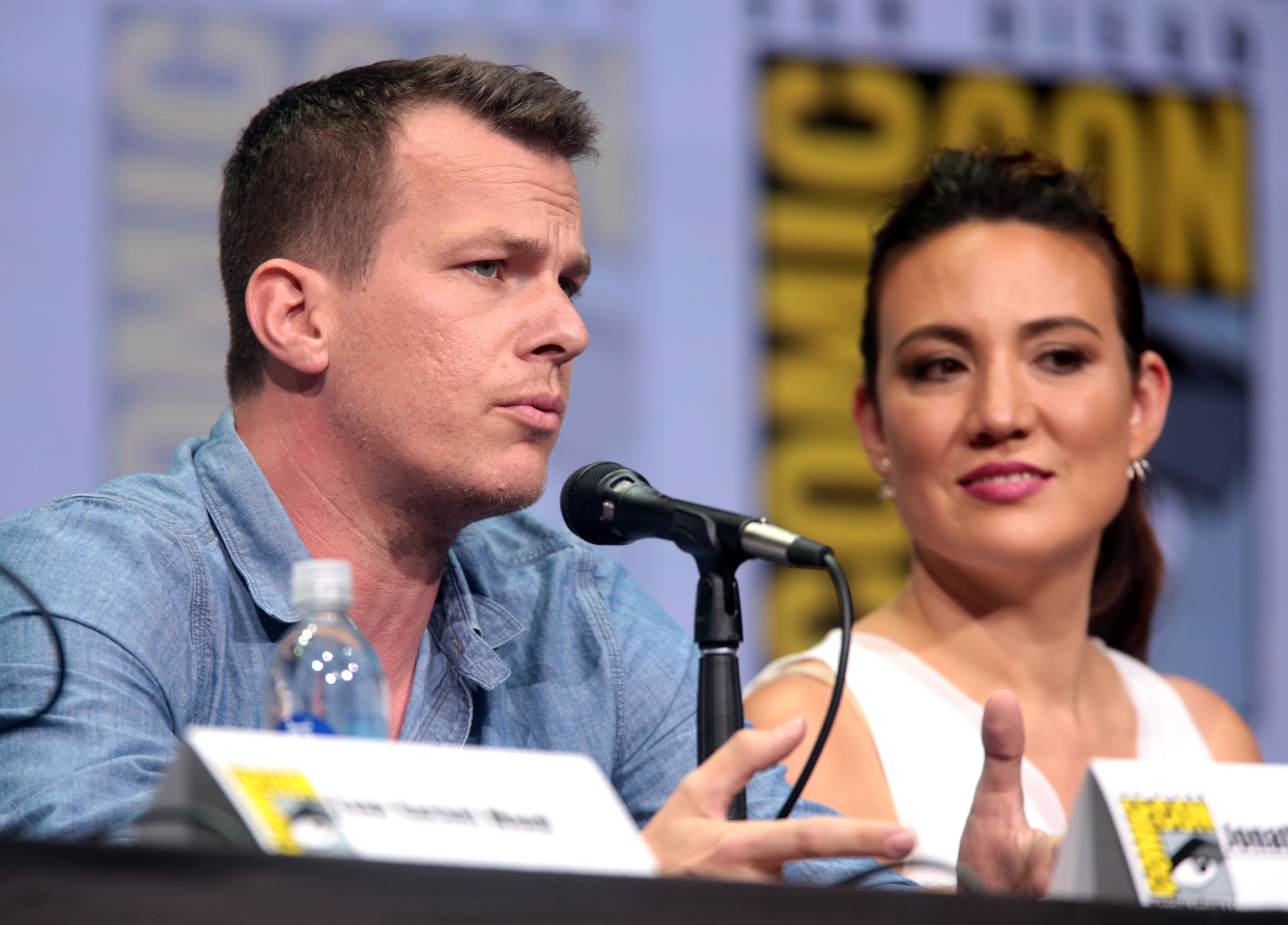
Jonathan Nolan and Lisa Joy co-wrote the episode.

The post-credits scene involving William and Emily was originally scripted to occur near the middle of the episode, at around the same time Bernard leaves the Forge after killing Dolores. Director Frederick E.O. Toye said that production found that having this scene in the middle of the episode would be too confusing to viewers as "there are such exhausting, mental exercises that you had to go through to get to it". The scene was then moved to the post-credits slot.

=== Music ===
The episode's last scene features a cover of Radiohead's "Codex". However at one point, the cover merges with the original version, which continues to play during the final credits. This marks the first time that both a cover and the original version of a song play in an episode of the series. The official soundtrack includes only Ramin Djawadi's cover.

== Reception ==
"The Passenger" was watched by 1.56 million viewers on its initial viewing, and received a 0.6 18–49 rating, even with the previous week.

The episode received generally positive reviews from critics, although criticism was aimed at the convoluted nature of the story. At Rotten Tomatoes, the episode has a 73% approval rating with an average score of 7.71/10, from 44 reviews. The website's critical consensus reads: "Compelling performances keep 'The Passenger' afloat among a flood of frustrating, fascinating twists, though in true Westworld fashion it may leave some viewers exhausted."
