= Out, Out Brief Candle (Six Feet Under) =

- Six Feet Under episode
- Episode no.: Season 2 Episode 2
- Directed by: Kathy Bates
- Written by: Laurence Andries
- Cinematography by: Alan Caso
- Editing by: Sue Blainey
- Original release date: March 10, 2002
- Running time: 58 minutes

Guest appearances
- Eric Balfour as Gabriel Dimas; Justina Machado as Vanessa Diaz; Julie White as Mitzi Dalton Huntley; Alice Krige as Alma; Page Kennedy as Josh Langmead; Dee Freeman as Susan Langmead; Tuc Watkins as Trevor; Timm Sharp as Andy; Judith Hoag as Dawn

Episode chronology
← Previous "In the Game"	Next → "The Plan"

"Out, Out Brief Candle" is the second episode of the second season of the American drama television series Six Feet Under. It is the fifteenth overall episode of the series and was written by supervising producer Laurence Andries, and directed by Kathy Bates. It originally aired on HBO on March 10, 2002.

The series is set in Los Angeles, and depicts the lives of the Fisher family, who run a funeral home, along with their friends and lovers. It explores the conflicts that arise after the family's patriarch, Nathaniel, dies in a car accident. In the episode, Nate struggles in revealing his diagnosis to his family, while David continues getting close with Nate. Meanwhile, Claire finds that Gabe stole from her house.

According to Nielsen Media Research, the episode was seen by an estimated 4.64 million household viewers and gained a Nielsen household rating of 3.0. The episode received positive reviews from critics, who praised the performances and character development.

== Plot ==
At a high school, a coach gets his football team to run in the field amidst a very hot day. After an extensive run, one of the students, Sam, collapses on the field. The coach and staff check on him, but Sam regains consciousness. They fail to see that Sam's friend, Josh Langmead (Page Kennedy), has died from a heat stroke.

With Nate (Peter Krause) having passed his licensing exam, he helps David (Michael C. Hall) with Joshua's funeral arrangements. During this, Federico (Freddy Rodriguez) takes an interest in a new house with Vanessa (Justina Machado), and asks them for $11,000 to secure the loan, which David promises to give the following day. Despite the promise, David enthusiastically buys a $20,000 casket wall to raise profits after finding that one of their caskets has already ran out. Rico is upset with the news, once again lamenting that they have not considered him for a possible partnership.

At school, Claire (Lauren Ambrose) and Parker (Marina Black) are taken aback when Andy (Timm Sharp) displays an erratic behavior and has a seizure. Gabe (Eric Balfour) tends to Andy while Claire gets the nurse to help. It is revealed that Andy used drugs combined with embalming fluid, and Claire is horrified to learn that Gabe stole it when he was visiting her. When she confronts him, he admits it, as well as confessing that he committed a robbery at the convenience store. He asks her to help him, but Claire abandons him. Per advice from Robbie, Ruth (Frances Conroy) attends a self-help seminar named "The Plan".

David and Nate are visited by Mitzi Dalton Huntley (Julie White), a Kroehner representative. She hopes they can form a friendly partnership, but they are not interested. Later, when they receive the casket wall, they are shocked to learn that Huntley paid for it as she now owns the company that produces them. David accompanies Keith (Mathew St. Patrick) to a birthday party for his niece Taylor, but they are astounded that her drug addicted mother Karla has not arranged anything. Keith confronts her and is forced to leave early. Nate attends dinner with Brenda (Rachel Griffiths), who has invited her ex-boyfriend Trevor (Tuc Watkins) and his new girlfriend Dawn (Judith Hoag). While Nate is afraid of being unfavorably, but Brenda makes it clear she appreciates him. After imagining a conversation with Josh, Nate finally reveals his arteriovenous malformation diagnosis to David, fearing that he could die at any moment.

== Production ==
=== Development ===
The episode was written by supervising producer Laurence Andries, and directed by Kathy Bates. This was Andries' third writing credit, and Bates' third directing credit.

== Reception ==
=== Viewers ===
In its original American broadcast, "Out, Out Brief Candle" was seen by an estimated 4.64 million household viewers with a household rating of 3.0. This means that it was seen by 3.0% of the nation's estimated households, and was watched by 3.15 million households. This was a 26% decrease in viewership from the previous episode, which was watched by 6.24 million household viewers with a household rating of 4.0.

=== Critical reviews ===
"Out, Out Brief Candle" received positive reviews from critics. John Teti of The A.V. Club wrote, "David may not be Mr. Parasailing Hang-Glider — he may be the type of guy who's like a kid on Christmas morning when he's inspecting a shiny new casket wall — but those who are close to him know that when the sine wave of their life hits a low ebb, David is the person they want nearby."

Entertainment Weekly gave the episode a "B" grade, and wrote, "Still setting up the plots for the season to come, the tension in ”Candle” only flickers. Still, it has its pleasures, chief among them the razor-sharp parody of self-help seminars and another visit from Kroehner bitch-on-wheels Mitzi." Mark Zimmer of Digitally Obsessed gave the episode a 3 out of 5 rating, writing "After an exciting season opener, Out Out, Brief Candle is a bit of a disappointment, with fewer high points. The bitchy, sexually aggressive Mitzi is amusingly predatory, and there's a nice bit as Nate repeatedly has visions of a deceased football player whom he'd rather ignore, but finally sees, echoing his coming to terms with the potentially deadly consequences of his AVM."

TV Tome gave the episode an 8 out of 10 rating and wrote "Not as good as the premier, but fun and insightful in place and a better directorial effort from Bates than her last episode." Billie Doux of Doux Reviews gave the episode a 3 out of 4 stars and wrote "The Fishers now have a bizarre casket wall, compliments of the very amusing Mitzi Huntley. It certainly had its comical aspects; David was like a kid in a candy store with all the toy caskets. It felt wrong to me, though. It made the funeral home seem too much like a business. Yeah, I know. It is a business." Television Without Pity gave the episode a "B" grade.

In 2016, Ross Bonaime of Paste ranked it 58th out of all 63 Six Feet Under episodes and wrote, "As the second season began, Six Feet Under felt quite muddled. “Out, Out Brief Candle” highlights this problem by throwing together a bunch of ideas, with few of them actually sticking and becoming interesting. Ruth joins a cult-y program, Rico becomes indebted to his sister-in-law and Brenda throws a dinner party for an old friend that she can't quite connect with anymore. It's all fine, but it also feels inconsequential. However Nate finally comes clean to someone — David — about his AVM diagnosis, which ends the episode with a big bang, even when everything else here sort of fizzles."
