= In the Game (Six Feet Under) =

- Six Feet Under episode
- Episode no.: Season 2 Episode 1
- Directed by: Rodrigo García
- Written by: Alan Ball
- Cinematography by: Alan Caso
- Editing by: Michael Ruscio
- Original release date: March 3, 2002
- Running time: 57 minutes

Guest appearances
- Shawn Hatosy as Brody Farrell; Richard Jenkins as Nathaniel Fisher Sr.; Ed O'Ross as Nikolai; Eric Balfour as Gabriel Dimas; Alexandra Holden as Becky Maxwell

Episode chronology
← Previous "Knock, Knock"	Next → "Out, Out Brief Candle"

"In the Game" is the first episode of the second season of the American drama television series Six Feet Under. It is the fourteenth overall episode of the series and was written by series creator Alan Ball, and directed by Rodrigo García. It originally aired on HBO on March 3, 2002.

The series is set in Los Angeles, and depicts the lives of the Fisher family, who run a funeral home, along with their friends and lovers. It explores the conflicts that arise after the family's patriarch, Nathaniel, dies in a car accident. In the episode, Nate struggles with his new diagnosis, while David and Claire continue feeling challenges in their relationships.

According to Nielsen Media Research, the episode was seen by an estimated 6.24 million household viewers and gained a Nielsen household rating of 4.0. The episode received highly positive reviews from critics, who praised the performances and writing. For the episode, Peter Krause received a nomination for Outstanding Lead Actor in a Drama Series at the 54th Primetime Emmy Awards.

== Plot ==
A woman is stalked and brutally killed by a man who breaks into her house. This is shown to be part of a movie premiere, with the actress Rebecca Milford (Alexandra Holden) delighted with reactions. She goes to the bathroom, where she starts snorting cocaine. However, she suffers a fatal overdose and dies alone in her stall.

Rebecca's boyfriend, Brody Farrell (Shawn Hatosy), visits Fisher & Sons to arrange her funeral, as he knows Federico (Freddy Rodriguez) through his sister-in-law. Her real name was Becky Maxwell, and her celebrity friends will help cover costs of the funeral. David (Michael C. Hall) has tried dating, but has not found an ideal match, and he has also been diagnosed with gonorrhea. As she still recovers from the car crash, Brenda (Rachel Griffiths) has been feeling unsatisfied while having sex with Nate (Peter Krause), who has not told his family about his medical diagnosis.

Feeling discontent with his love life, David visits Keith (Mathew St. Patrick) at his church, finding him with Eddie. He later calls Keith to catch up, but Keith makes it clear he has moved on from him. Claire (Lauren Ambrose) and Gabe (Eric Balfour) continue dating, but Claire is worried that Gabe is ditching his future by skipping classes. To get close, Gabe decides to check Fisher & Sons, including the morgue. After attending Becky's funeral, they go to the theater to watch her horror movie.

Ruth (Frances Conroy) starts reading a book to understand gay culture, and invites Nikolai (Ed O'Ross) to dine with her family, leading to an awkward meeting when she talks about her sexual life. During this, Nate starts using aspirin, unaware that David replaced them for ecstasy, causing him to try to flirt with Brenda during dinner. Later, Nate finds himself conversing with Nathaniel (Richard Jenkins), as well as two entities representing Life and Death. Nate goes to the beach with Brenda, who has to leave after staying with him. David calls Nate and reveals he has passed the Funeral Director exam. As he stares at the ocean, Nathaniel appears and tells him, "You're in the game now, buddy boy, whether you like it or not."

== Production ==
=== Development ===
The episode was written by series creator Alan Ball, and directed by Rodrigo García. This was Ball's fourth writing credit, and García's third directing credit.

== Reception ==
=== Viewers ===
In its original American broadcast, "In the Game" was seen by an estimated 6.24 million household viewers with a household rating of 4.0. This means that it was seen by 4.0% of the nation's estimated households, and was watched by 4.17 million households. This was a 12% decrease in viewership from the previous episode, which was watched by 7.06 million household viewers with a household rating of 4.5.

=== Critical reviews ===
"In the Game" received highly positive reviews from critics. John Teti of The A.V. Club wrote, "Claire follows him down there and can't contain her concern, which infuriates Gabe: “I'm not a pet! I'm not your pet!” Claire is bewildered. He's clearly not okay, and he clearly needs her, so why does he act like he hates her so much? She wants the different parts of Gabe to add up to a self-consistent whole. But the pieces rarely come together the way we might like."

Entertainment Weekly gave the episode an "A–" grade, and wrote, "Though the episode is a bit heavy on the fantasy sequences, Krause's Ecstasy yammerings are hilarious, and Hatosy's brief cameo as the worst that young Hollywood has to offer is priceless." Mark Zimmer of Digitally Obsessed gave the episode a perfect 5 out of 5 rating, writing "The highlight of this episode is the excruciatingly uncomfortable family dinner, which Nate has already termed a "freak fest," and indeed it is, not the least because he assumes that only aspirin is kept in an aspirin bottle. The dim-witted Brody's ridiculous eulogy song (and Claire's reaction to it) is hilarious, and Nate's bizarre hallucination in which Life and Death get way too intimate is simultaneously creepy and funny."

TV Tome gave the episode a 9 out of 10 rating and wrote "Despite one or two little flaws, I absolutely loved this episode. It may not be a resounding epic, but it sure as hell was a brilliant way to open this season. Here's hoping the good work continues apace." Billie Doux of Doux Reviews gave the episode a perfect 4 out of 4 stars and wrote "Some people are just delightful when they're high, and Nate was just that: delightful. It certainly broke the ice." Television Without Pity gave the episode an "A–" grade.

In 2016, Ross Bonaime of Paste ranked it 47th out of all 63 Six Feet Under episodes and wrote, "After Six Feet Under's fantastic first season, the second season premiere “In the Game” is a bit of a let down. Nate and Brenda start to slip apart, both living in their own states of depression (momentarily alleviated by Nate accidentally taking ecstasy). Nate's trip leads to one of the odder fantasy moments of the series, as he and his father watch Life and Death personified having sex in front of them. “In the Game” has plenty of nice allusions to the series premiere, but it also feels like Six Feet Under trying to find its footing after the break."

=== Accolades ===
Peter Krause submitted the episode to support his nomination for Outstanding Lead Actor in a Drama Series at the 54th Primetime Emmy Awards. He would lose to Michael Chiklis for The Shield.
