= Primetime Emmy Award for Outstanding Lead Actor in a Drama Series =

Award for lead actor in a television drama series

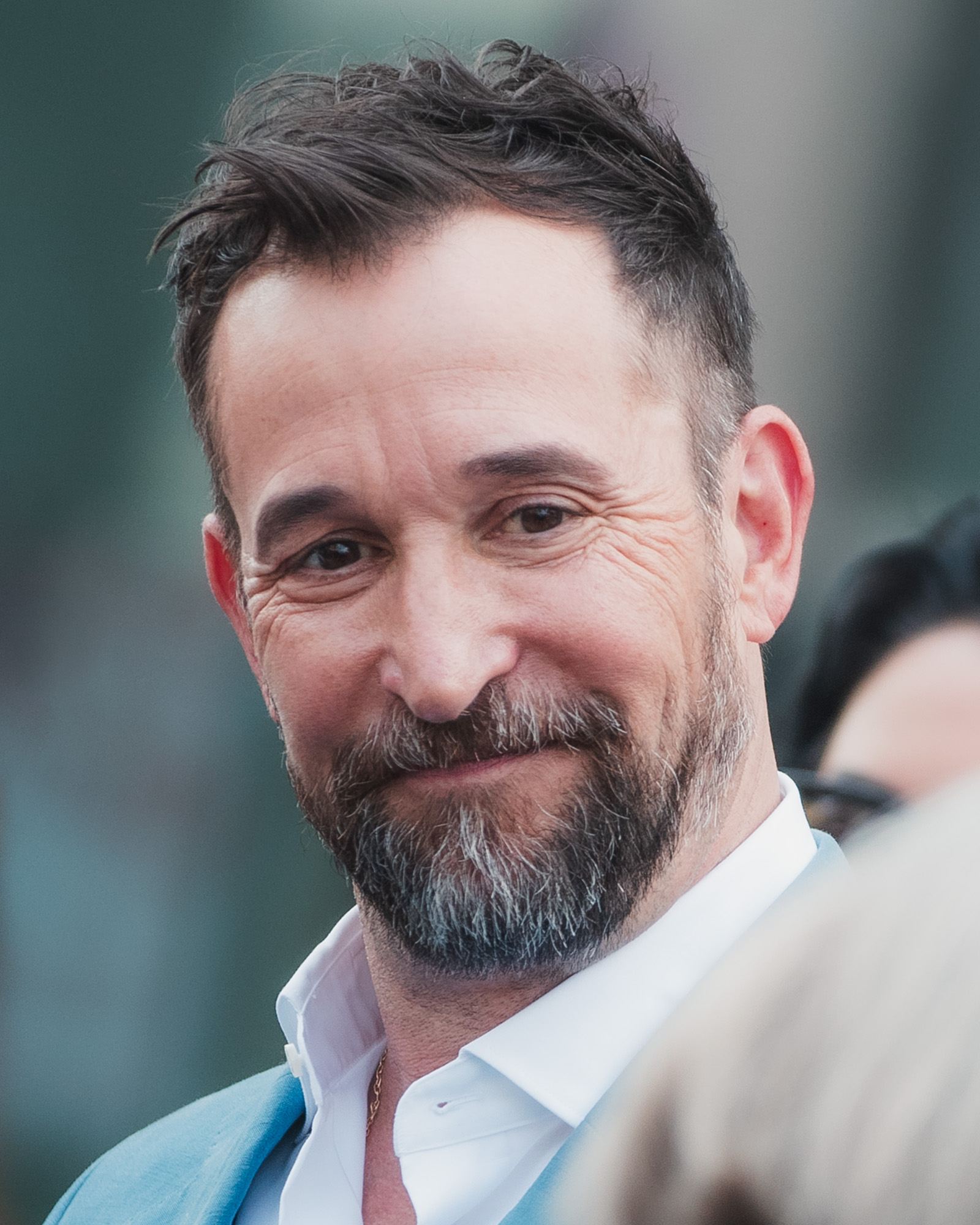
- The 2026 recipient: Noah Wyle
- Awarded for: Outstanding Lead Actor in a Drama Series
- Country: United States
- Presented by: Academy of Television Arts & Sciences
- First award: 1954; 72 years ago
- Currently held by: Noah Wyle, The Pitt (2026)
- Website: emmys.com

The Primetime Emmy Award for Outstanding Lead Actor in a Drama Series is an award presented by the Academy of Television Arts & Sciences (ATAS). Beginning with 1966, leading actors in drama have competed alone. However, these dramatic performances included actors from miniseries, telefilms, and guest performers competing against main cast competitors. Such instances are marked below:

- # – Indicates a performance in a miniseries or television film, before the category's creation
- § – Indicates a performance as a guest performer, before and after the category's creation

== Winners and nominations ==
=== 1950s ===
Year	Actor	Role	Program	Network
Best Male Star of a Regular Series
1954 (6th) (Note: Early Emmy ceremonies did not have genre specific acting categories)
1954 (6th)	Donald O'Connor	Himself	The Colgate Comedy Hour	NBC
1954 (6th)	Sid Caesar	Various characters	Your Show of Shows	NBC
1954 (6th)	Wally Cox	Robinson Peepers	Mister Peepers	NBC
1954 (6th)	Jackie Gleason	Various characters	The Jackie Gleason Show	CBS
1954 (6th)	Jack Webb	Joe Friday	Dragnet	NBC
Best Actor Starring in a Regular Series
1955 (7th)
1955 (7th)	Danny Thomas	Danny Williams	Make Room for Daddy	ABC
1955 (7th)	Richard Boone	Dr. Konrad Styner	Medic	NBC
1955 (7th)	Robert Cummings	Robert Beanblossom	My Hero	NBC
1955 (7th)	Jackie Gleason	Various characters	The Jackie Gleason Show	CBS
1955 (7th)	Jack Webb	Joe Friday	Dragnet	NBC
Best Actor - Continuing Performance
1956 (8th)
1956 (8th)	Phil Silvers	MSgt. Ernest G. Bilko	The Phil Silvers Show	CBS
1956 (8th)	Robert Cummings	Bob Collins	The Bob Cummings Show	CBS
1956 (8th)	Jackie Gleason	Ralph Kramden	The Honeymooners	CBS
1956 (8th)	Danny Thomas	Danny Williams	Make Room for Daddy	ABC
1956 (8th)	Robert Young	Jim Anderson	Father Knows Best	CBS
Best Continuing Performance by an Actor
1957 (9th)
1957 (9th)	Robert Young	Jim Anderson	Father Knows Best	NBC
1957 (9th)	James Arness	Matt Dillon	Gunsmoke	CBS
1957 (9th)	Charles Boyer	Various characters	Four Star Playhouse	CBS
1957 (9th)	David Niven	Various characters	Four Star Playhouse	CBS
1957 (9th)	Hugh O'Brian	Wyatt Earp	The Life and Legend of Wyatt Earp	ABC
Best Continuing Performance by an Actor in a Leading Role in a Dramatic or Comedy Series
1958 (10th)
1958 (10th)	Robert Young	Jim Anderson	Father Knows Best	NBC
1958 (10th)	James Arness	Matt Dillon	Gunsmoke	CBS
1958 (10th)	Robert Cummings	Bob Collins	The Bob Cummings Show	CBS
1958 (10th)	Phil Silvers	MSgt. Ernest G. Bilko	The Phil Silvers Show	CBS
1958 (10th)	Danny Thomas	Danny Williams	The Danny Thomas Show	ABC & CBS
Best Actor in a Leading Role (Continuing Character) in a Dramatic Series
1959 (11th)
1959 (11th)	Raymond Burr	Perry Mason	Perry Mason	CBS
1959 (11th)	James Arness	Matt Dillon	Gunsmoke	CBS
1959 (11th)	Richard Boone	Paladin	Have Gun – Will Travel	CBS
1959 (11th)	James Garner	Bret Maverick	Maverick	ABC
1959 (11th)	Craig Stevens	Peter Gunn	Peter Gunn	NBC
1959 (11th)	Efrem Zimbalist Jr.	Stuart Bailey	77 Sunset Strip	ABC

=== 1960s ===
Year	Actor	Role	Program	Network
Outstanding Performance by an Actor in a Series (Lead or Support)
1960 (12th)
1960 (12th)	Robert Stack	Eliot Ness	The Untouchables	ABC
1960 (12th)	Richard Boone	Paladin	Have Gun – Will Travel	CBS
1960 (12th)	Raymond Burr	Perry Mason	Perry Mason	CBS
Outstanding Performance by an Actor in a Series (Lead)
1961 (13th)
1961 (13th)	Raymond Burr	Perry Mason	Perry Mason	CBS
1961 (13th)	Jackie Cooper	Chick Hennesey	Hennesey	CBS
1961 (13th)	Robert Stack	Eliot Ness	The Untouchables	ABC
Outstanding Continued Performance by an Actor in a Series (Lead)
1962 (14th)
1962 (14th)	E. G. Marshall	Lawrence Preston	The Defenders	CBS
1962 (14th)	Paul Burke	Det. Adam Flint	Naked City	ABC
1962 (14th)	Jackie Cooper	Chick Hennesey	Hennesey	CBS
1962 (14th)	Vince Edwards	Ben Casey	Ben Casey	ABC
1962 (14th)	George Maharis	Buz Murdock	Route 66	CBS
1963 (15th)
1963 (15th)	E. G. Marshall	Lawrence Preston	The Defenders	CBS
1963 (15th)	Ernest Borgnine	Lt. Cmdr. Quinton McHale	McHale's Navy	ABC
1963 (15th)	Paul Burke	Det. Adam Flint	Naked City	ABC
1963 (15th)	Vic Morrow	Sgt. Sanders	Combat!	ABC
1963 (15th)	Dick Van Dyke	Rob Petrie	The Dick Van Dyke Show	CBS
1964 (16th)
1964 (16th)	Dick Van Dyke	Rob Petrie	The Dick Van Dyke Show	CBS
1964 (16th)	Richard Boone	Various characters	The Richard Boone Show	NBC
1964 (16th)	Dean Jagger	Principal Albert Vane	Mr. Novak	NBC
1964 (16th)	David Janssen	Dr. Richard Kimble	The Fugitive	ABC
1964 (16th)	George C. Scott	Neil Brock	East Side/West Side	CBS
Outstanding Individual Achievements in Entertainment - Actors and Performers
1965 (17th)
1965 (17th)	Leonard Bernstein	Conductor	New York Philharmonic Young People's Concerts with Leonard Bernstein	CBS
1965 (17th)	Lynn Fontanne	Fanny Bowditch Holmes	Hallmark Hall of Fame: "The Magnificent Yankee"	NBC
1965 (17th)	Alfred Lunt	Oliver Wendell Holmes Jr.	Hallmark Hall of Fame: "The Magnificent Yankee"	NBC
1965 (17th)	Barbra Streisand	Herself	My Name Is Barbra	CBS
1965 (17th)	Dick Van Dyke	Rob Petrie	The Dick Van Dyke Show	CBS
1965 (17th)	Julie Andrews	Herself	The Andy Williams Show: "November 30, 1964"	NBC
1965 (17th)	Johnny Carson	Host	The Tonight Show Starring Johnny Carson	NBC
1965 (17th)	Gladys Cooper	Margaret St. Clair	The Rogues	NBC
1965 (17th)	Robert Coote	Timmy St. Clair	The Rogues	NBC
1965 (17th)	Richard Crenna	James Slattery	Slattery's People	CBS
1965 (17th)	Julie Harris	Florence Nightingale	Hallmark Hall of Fame: "The Holy Terror"	NBC
1965 (17th)	Bob Hope	Himself	Chrysler Presents A Bob Hope Comedy Special	NBC
1965 (17th)	Dean Jagger	Principal Albert Vane	Mr. Novak	NBC
1965 (17th)	Danny Kaye	Host	The Danny Kaye Show	CBS
1965 (17th)	David McCallum	Illya Kuryakin	The Man from U.N.C.L.E.	NBC
1965 (17th)	Red Skelton	Himself	The Red Skelton Hour	CBS
Outstanding Continued Performance by an Actor in a Leading Role in a Dramatic Series
1966 (18th)
1966 (18th)	Bill Cosby	Alexander Scott	I Spy	NBC
1966 (18th)	Richard Crenna	James Slattery	Slattery's People	CBS
1966 (18th)	Robert Culp	Kelly Robinson	I Spy	NBC
1966 (18th)	David Janssen	Dr. Richard Kimble	The Fugitive	ABC
1966 (18th)	David McCallum	Illya Kuryakin	The Man from U.N.C.L.E.	NBC
1967 (19th)
1967 (19th)	Bill Cosby	Alexander Scott	I Spy	NBC
1967 (19th)	Robert Culp	Kelly Robinson	I Spy	NBC
1967 (19th)	Ben Gazzara	Paul Bryan	Run for Your Life	NBC
1967 (19th)	David Janssen	Dr. Richard Kimble	The Fugitive	ABC
1967 (19th)	Martin Landau	Rollin Hand	Mission: Impossible	CBS
1968 (20th)
1968 (20th)	Bill Cosby	Alexander Scott	I Spy	NBC
1968 (20th)	Raymond Burr	Robert T. Ironside	Ironside	NBC
1968 (20th)	Robert Culp	Kelly Robinson	I Spy	NBC
1968 (20th)	Ben Gazzara	Paul Bryan	Run for Your Life	NBC
1968 (20th)	Martin Landau	Rollin Hand	Mission: Impossible	CBS
1969 (21st)
1969 (21st)	Carl Betz	Clinton Judd	Judd, for the Defense	ABC
1969 (21st)	Raymond Burr	Robert T. Ironside	Ironside	NBC
1969 (21st)	Peter Graves	Jim Phelps	Mission: Impossible	CBS
1969 (21st)	Martin Landau	Rollin Hand	Mission: Impossible	CBS
1969 (21st)	Ross Martin	Artemus Gordon	The Wild Wild West	CBS

=== 1970s ===
Year	Actor	Role	Program	Network
Outstanding Continued Performance by an Actor in a Leading Role in a Dramatic Series
1970 (22nd)
1970 (22nd)	Robert Young	Dr. Marcus Welby	Marcus Welby, M.D.	ABC
1970 (22nd)	Raymond Burr	Robert T. Ironside	Ironside	NBC
1970 (22nd)	Mike Connors	Joe Mannix	Mannix	CBS
1970 (22nd)	Robert Wagner	Al Mundy	It Takes a Thief	ABC
1971 (23rd)
1971 (23rd)	Hal Holbrook	Hays Stowe	The Bold Ones: The Senator	NBC
1971 (23rd)	Raymond Burr	Robert T. Ironside	Ironside	NBC
1971 (23rd)	Mike Connors	Joe Mannix	Mannix	CBS
1971 (23rd)	Robert Young	Dr. Marcus Welby	Marcus Welby, M.D.	ABC
1972 (24th)
1972 (24th)	Peter Falk	Columbo	Columbo	NBC
1972 (24th)	Raymond Burr	Robert T. Ironside	Ironside	NBC
1972 (24th)	Mike Connors	Joe Mannix	Mannix	CBS
1972 (24th)	Keith Michell #	Henry VIII of England	The Six Wives of Henry VIII	CBS
1972 (24th)	Robert Young	Dr. Marcus Welby	Marcus Welby, M.D.	ABC
Outstanding Continued Performance by an Actor in a Leading Role (Drama Series - Continuing)
1973 (25th)
1973 (25th)	Richard Thomas	John-Boy Walton	The Waltons	CBS
1973 (25th)	David Carradine	Kwai Chang Caine	Kung Fu	ABC
1973 (25th)	Mike Connors	Joe Mannix	Mannix	CBS
1973 (25th)	William Conrad	Frank Cannon	Cannon	CBS
1973 (25th)	Peter Falk	Columbo	Columbo	NBC
Best Lead Actor in a Drama Series
1974 (26th)
1974 (26th)	Telly Savalas	Lt. Theo Kojak	Kojak	CBS
1974 (26th)	William Conrad	Frank Cannon	Cannon	CBS
1974 (26th)	Karl Malden	Lt. Mike Stone	The Streets of San Francisco	ABC
1974 (26th)	Richard Thomas	John-Boy Walton	The Waltons	CBS
Outstanding Lead Actor in a Drama Series
1975 (27th)
1975 (27th)	Robert Blake	Det. Tony Baretta	Baretta	ABC
1975 (27th)	Karl Malden	Lt. Mike Stone	The Streets of San Francisco	ABC
1975 (27th)	Barry Newman	Anthony J. Petrocelli	Petrocelli	NBC
1975 (27th)	Telly Savalas	Lt. Theo Kojak	Kojak	CBS
1976 (28th)
1976 (28th)	Peter Falk	Columbo	Columbo	NBC
1976 (28th)	James Garner	Jim Rockford	The Rockford Files	NBC
1976 (28th)	Karl Malden	Lt. Mike Stone	The Streets of San Francisco	ABC
1977 (29th)
1977 (29th)	James Garner	Jim Rockford	The Rockford Files	NBC
1977 (29th)	Robert Blake	Det. Tony Baretta	Baretta	ABC
1977 (29th)	Peter Falk	Columbo	Columbo	NBC
1977 (29th)	Jack Klugman	Dr. R. Quincy, M.E.	Quincy, M.E.	NBC
1977 (29th)	Karl Malden	Lt. Mike Stone	The Streets of San Francisco	ABC
1978 (30th)
1978 (30th)	Ed Asner	Lou Grant	Lou Grant	CBS
1978 (30th)	James Broderick	Doug Lawrence	Family	ABC
1978 (30th)	Peter Falk	Columbo	Columbo	NBC
1978 (30th)	James Garner	Jim Rockford	The Rockford Files	NBC
1978 (30th)	Jack Klugman	Dr. R. Quincy, M.E.	Quincy, M.E.	NBC
1978 (30th)	Ralph Waite	John Walton, Sr.	The Waltons	CBS
1979 (31st)
1979 (31st)	Ron Leibman	Martin Kazinski	Kaz	CBS
1979 (31st)	Ed Asner	Lou Grant	Lou Grant	CBS
1979 (31st)	James Garner	Jim Rockford	The Rockford Files	NBC
1979 (31st)	Jack Klugman	Dr. R. Quincy, M.E.	Quincy, M.E.	NBC

=== 1980s ===
Year	Actor	Role	Program	Network
1980 (32nd)
1980 (32nd)	Ed Asner	Lou Grant	Lou Grant	CBS
1980 (32nd)	James Garner	Jim Rockford	The Rockford Files	NBC
1980 (32nd)	Jack Klugman	R. Quincy	Quincy, M.E.	NBC
1980 (32nd)	Larry Hagman	J. R. Ewing	Dallas	CBS
1981 (33rd)
1981 (33rd)	Daniel J. Travanti	Frank Furillo	Hill Street Blues	NBC
1981 (33rd)	Ed Asner	Lou Grant	Lou Grant	CBS
1981 (33rd)	Jim Davis (posthumously)	Jock Ewing	Dallas	CBS
1981 (33rd)	Larry Hagman	J. R. Ewing	Dallas	CBS
1981 (33rd)	Louis Gossett Jr. §	Bessie's Father	Palmerstown, U.S.A.	CBS
1981 (33rd)	Pernell Roberts	Trapper John McIntyre	Trapper John, M.D.	CBS
1982 (34th)
1982 (34th)	Daniel J. Travanti	Frank Furillo	Hill Street Blues	NBC
1982 (34th)	Ed Asner	Lou Grant	Lou Grant	CBS
1982 (34th)	Tom Selleck	Thomas Magnum	Magnum, P.I.	CBS
1982 (34th)	James Garner	Bret Maverick	Bret Maverick	NBC
1982 (34th)	John Forsythe	Blake Carrington	Dynasty	ABC
1983 (35th)
1983 (35th)	Ed Flanders	Donald Westphall	St. Elsewhere	NBC
1983 (35th)	Tom Selleck	Thomas Magnum	Magnum, P.I.	CBS
1983 (35th)	William Daniels	Mark Craig	St. Elsewhere	NBC
1983 (35th)	John Forsythe	Blake Carrington	Dynasty	ABC
1983 (35th)	Daniel J. Travanti	Frank Furillo	Hill Street Blues	NBC
1984 (36th)
1984 (36th)	Tom Selleck	Thomas Magnum	Magnum, P.I.	CBS
1984 (36th)	William Daniels	Mark Craig	St. Elsewhere	NBC
1984 (36th)	Ed Flanders	Donald Westphall	St. Elsewhere	NBC
1984 (36th)	Daniel J. Travanti	Frank Furillo	Hill Street Blues	NBC
1984 (36th)	John Forsythe	Blake Carrington	Dynasty	ABC
1985 (37th)
1985 (37th)	William Daniels	Mark Craig	St. Elsewhere	NBC
1985 (37th)	Don Johnson	Sonny Crockett	Miami Vice	NBC
1985 (37th)	Ed Flanders	Donald Westphall	St. Elsewhere	NBC
1985 (37th)	Daniel J. Travanti	Frank Furillo	Hill Street Blues	NBC
1985 (37th)	Tom Selleck	Thomas Magnum	Magnum, P.I.	CBS
1986 (38th)
1986 (38th)	William Daniels	Mark Craig	St. Elsewhere	NBC
1986 (38th)	Tom Selleck	Thomas Magnum	Magnum, P.I.	CBS
1986 (38th)	Edward Woodward	Robert McCall	The Equalizer	CBS
1986 (38th)	Bruce Willis	David Addison	Moonlighting	ABC
1986 (38th)	Ed Flanders	Donald Westphall	St. Elsewhere	NBC
1987 (39th)
1987 (39th)	Bruce Willis	David Addison	Moonlighting	ABC
1987 (39th)	William Daniels	Mark Craig	St. Elsewhere	NBC
1987 (39th)	Ed Flanders	Donald Westphall	St. Elsewhere	NBC
1987 (39th)	Corbin Bernsen	Arnie Becker	L.A. Law	NBC
1987 (39th)	Edward Woodward	Robert McCall	The Equalizer	CBS
1988 (40th)
1988 (40th)	Richard Kiley	Joe Gardner	A Year in the Life	NBC
1988 (40th)	Corbin Bernsen	Arnie Becker	L.A. Law	NBC
1988 (40th)	Michael Tucker	Stuart Markowitz	L.A. Law	NBC
1988 (40th)	Ron Perlman	Vincent	Beauty and the Beast	CBS
1988 (40th)	Edward Woodward	Robert McCall	The Equalizer	CBS
1989 (41st)
1989 (41st)	Carroll O'Connor	Bill Gillespie	In the Heat of the Night	NBC
1989 (41st)	Ken Wahl	Vinnie Terranova	Wiseguy	CBS
1989 (41st)	Edward Woodward	Robert McCall	The Equalizer	CBS
1989 (41st)	Ron Perlman	Vincent	Beauty and the Beast	CBS
1989 (41st)	Michael Tucker	Stuart Markowitz	L.A. Law	NBC

=== 1990s ===
Year	Actor	Role	Program	Episode Submissions	Network
1990 (42nd)
1990 (42nd)	Peter Falk	Columbo	Columbo	"Agenda for Murder"	ABC
1990 (42nd)	Scott Bakula	Sam Beckett	Quantum Leap	—N/a	NBC
1990 (42nd)	Robert Loggia	Nick Mancuso	Mancuso, F.B.I.	—N/a	NBC
1990 (42nd)	Kyle MacLachlan	Dale Cooper	Twin Peaks	—N/a	ABC
1990 (42nd)	Edward Woodward	Robert McCall	The Equalizer	—N/a	CBS
1991 (43rd)
1991 (43rd)	James Earl Jones	Gabriel Bird	Gabriel's Fire	"Pilot"	ABC
1991 (43rd)	Scott Bakula	Sam Beckett	Quantum Leap	"Shock Theater: October 3, 1954"	NBC
1991 (43rd)	Michael Moriarty	Benjamin Stone	Law & Order	"Indifference"	NBC
1991 (43rd)	Peter Falk	Columbo	Columbo	"Columbo and the Murder of a Rock Star"	ABC
1991 (43rd)	Kyle MacLachlan	Dale Cooper	Twin Peaks	"Episode 16"	ABC
1992 (44th)
1992 (44th)	Christopher Lloyd §	Alistair Dimple	Road to Avonlea	"Another Point of View"	Disney Channel
1992 (44th)	Scott Bakula	Sam Beckett	Quantum Leap	"Dreams: February 28, 1979"	NBC
1992 (44th)	Harrison Page §	Reverend Walters	Quantum Leap	"Song for the Soul: April 7, 1963"	NBC
1992 (44th)	Kirk Douglas §	General Kalthrob	Tales from the Crypt	"Yellow"	HBO
1992 (44th)	Rob Morrow	Joel Fleischman	Northern Exposure	"Jules et Joel"	CBS
1992 (44th)	Michael Moriarty	Benjamin Stone	Law & Order	"The Wages of Love"	NBC
1992 (44th)	Sam Waterston	Forrest Bedford	I'll Fly Away	"Hard Lessons Master Magician"	NBC
1993 (45th)
1993 (45th)	Tom Skerritt	Jimmy Brock	Picket Fences	"High Tidings"	CBS
1993 (45th)	Scott Bakula	Sam Beckett	Quantum Leap	"Lee Harvey Oswald: October 5, 1957-November 22, 1963"	NBC
1993 (45th)	Michael Moriarty	Benjamin Stone	Law & Order	"Night and Fog"	NBC
1993 (45th)	Sam Waterston	Forrest Bedford	I'll Fly Away	"All in the Life"	NBC
1993 (45th)	Rob Morrow	Joel Fleischman	Northern Exposure	"Kaddish for Uncle Manny"	CBS
1994 (46th)
1994 (46th)	Dennis Franz	Andy Sipowicz	NYPD Blue	"NYPD Lou"	ABC
1994 (46th)	David Caruso	John Kelly	NYPD Blue	"Pilot"	ABC
1994 (46th)	Michael Moriarty	Benjamin Stone	Law & Order	"Sanctuary"	NBC
1994 (46th)	Tom Skerritt	Jimmy Brock	Picket Fences	"Dairy Queen"	CBS
1994 (46th)	Peter Falk	Columbo	Columbo	"It's All in the Game"	ABC
1995 (47th)
1995 (47th)	Mandy Patinkin	Jeffrey Geiger	Chicago Hope	"Over the Rainbow"	CBS
1995 (47th)	Dennis Franz	Andy Sipowicz	NYPD Blue	"A.D.A. Sipowicz"	ABC
1995 (47th)	Jimmy Smits	Bobby Simone	NYPD Blue	"The Bookie and Kooky Cookie"	ABC
1995 (47th)	George Clooney	Doug Ross	ER	"Long Day's Journey"	NBC
1995 (47th)	Anthony Edwards	Mark Greene	ER	"Love's Labor Lost"	NBC
1996 (48th)
1996 (48th)	Dennis Franz	Andy Sipowicz	NYPD Blue	"Closing Time"	ABC
1996 (48th)	Jimmy Smits	Bobby Simone	NYPD Blue	"A Death in the Family"	ABC
1996 (48th)	Andre Braugher	Frank Pembleton	Homicide: Life on the Street	"For God and Country"	NBC
1996 (48th)	George Clooney	Doug Ross	ER	"Hell and High Water"	NBC
1996 (48th)	Anthony Edwards	Mark Greene	ER	"A Shift in the Night"	NBC
1997 (49th)
1997 (49th)	Dennis Franz	Andy Sipowicz	NYPD Blue	"Where's 'Swaldo?"	ABC
1997 (49th)	Jimmy Smits	Bobby Simone	NYPD Blue	"My Wild Irish Nose"	ABC
1997 (49th)	David Duchovny	Fox Mulder	The X-Files	"Small Potatoes"	Fox
1997 (49th)	Anthony Edwards	Mark Greene	ER	"Tribes"	NBC
1997 (49th)	Sam Waterston	Jack McCoy	Law & Order	"Mad Dog"	NBC
1998 (50th)
1998 (50th)	Andre Braugher	Frank Pembleton	Homicide: Life on the Street	"Fallen Heroes, Part 2"	NBC
1998 (50th)	David Duchovny	Fox Mulder	The X-Files	"Redux II"	Fox
1998 (50th)	Dennis Franz	Andy Sipowicz	NYPD Blue	"The One That Got Away"	ABC
1998 (50th)	Jimmy Smits	Bobby Simone	NYPD Blue	"Lost Israel"	ABC
1998 (50th)	Anthony Edwards	Mark Greene	ER	"Family Practice"	NBC
1999 (51st)
1999 (51st)	Dennis Franz	Andy Sipowicz	NYPD Blue	"Safe Home"	ABC
1999 (51st)	Jimmy Smits	Bobby Simone	NYPD Blue	"Hearts and Souls"	ABC
1999 (51st)	James Gandolfini	Tony Soprano	The Sopranos	"The Sopranos"	HBO
1999 (51st)	Dylan McDermott	Bobby Donnell	The Practice	"Happily Ever After"	ABC
1999 (51st)	Sam Waterston	Jack McCoy	Law & Order	"Sideshow"	NBC

=== 2000s ===
Year	Actor	Role	Program	Episode Submissions	Network
2000 (52nd)
2000 (52nd)	James Gandolfini	Tony Soprano	The Sopranos	"The Happy Wanderer"	HBO
2000 (52nd)	Dennis Franz	Andy Sipowicz	NYPD Blue	"The Last Round Up"	ABC
2000 (52nd)	Jerry Orbach	Lennie Briscoe	Law & Order	"Marathon"	NBC
2000 (52nd)	Martin Sheen	Josiah Bartlet	The West Wing	"Take This Sabbath Day"	NBC
2000 (52nd)	Sam Waterston	Jack McCoy	Law & Order	"Killerz"	NBC
2001 (53rd)	James Gandolfini	Tony Soprano	The Sopranos	"Amour Fou"	HBO
2001 (53rd)	Andre Braugher	Dr. Ben Gideon	Gideon's Crossing	"The Lottery"	ABC
2001 (53rd)	Dennis Franz	Andy Sipowicz	NYPD Blue	"In the Wind"	ABC
2001 (53rd)	Martin Sheen	Josiah Bartlet	The West Wing	"Two Cathedrals"	NBC
2001 (53rd)	Rob Lowe	Sam Seaborn	The West Wing	"Somebody's Going to Emergency, Somebody's Going to Jail"	NBC
2002 (54th)	Michael Chiklis	Vic Mackey	The Shield	"Pilot"	FX
2002 (54th)	Kiefer Sutherland	Jack Bauer	24	"11:00 p.m. – 12:00 a.m."	Fox
2002 (54th)	Martin Sheen	Josiah Bartlet	The West Wing	"Night Five"	NBC
2002 (54th)	Michael C. Hall	David Fisher	Six Feet Under	"A Private Life"	HBO
2002 (54th)	Peter Krause	Nate Fisher	Six Feet Under	"In the Game"	HBO
2003 (55th)
2003 (55th)	James Gandolfini	Tony Soprano	The Sopranos	"Whitecaps"	HBO
2003 (55th)	Kiefer Sutherland	Jack Bauer	24	"Day 2: 10:00 p.m. – 11:00 p.m."	Fox
2003 (55th)	Martin Sheen	Josiah Bartlet	The West Wing	"Twenty Five"	NBC
2003 (55th)	Michael Chiklis	Vic Mackey	The Shield	"Dominoes Falling"	FX
2003 (55th)	Peter Krause	Nate Fisher	Six Feet Under	"The Secret"	HBO
2004 (56th)
2004 (56th)	James Spader	Alan Shore	The Practice	"Mr. Shore Goes to Town"	ABC
2004 (56th)	Anthony LaPaglia	Jack Malone	Without a Trace	—N/a	CBS
2004 (56th)	James Gandolfini	Tony Soprano	The Sopranos	"Where's Johnny?"	HBO
2004 (56th)	Kiefer Sutherland	Jack Bauer	24	"Day 3: 12:00 p.m. – 1:00 p.m."	Fox
2004 (56th)	Martin Sheen	Josiah Bartlet	The West Wing	"Memorial Day"	NBC
2005 (57th)
2005 (57th)	James Spader	Alan Shore	Boston Legal	"Death Be Not Proud"	ABC
2005 (57th)	Hank Azaria	Dr. Craig "Huff" Huffstodt	Huff	"Crazy Nuts & All Fucked Up"	Showtime
2005 (57th)	Hugh Laurie	Gregory House	House	"Detox"	Fox
2005 (57th)	Ian McShane	Al Swearengen	Deadwood	"The Whores Can Come"	HBO
2005 (57th)	Kiefer Sutherland	Jack Bauer	24	"Day 4: 2:00 a.m. – 3:00 a.m."	Fox
2006 (58th)
2006 (58th)	Kiefer Sutherland	Jack Bauer	24	"Day 5: 7:00 a.m. – 8:00 a.m."	Fox
2006 (58th)	Christopher Meloni	Elliot Stabler	Law & Order: Special Victims Unit	"Ripped"	NBC
2006 (58th)	Denis Leary	Tommy Gavin	Rescue Me	"Justice"	FX
2006 (58th)	Martin Sheen	Josiah Bartlet	The West Wing	"Tomorrow"	NBC
2006 (58th)	Peter Krause	Nate Fisher	Six Feet Under	"Time Flies"	HBO
2007 (59th)
2007 (59th)	James Spader	Alan Shore	Boston Legal	"Angel of Death"	ABC
2007 (59th)	Denis Leary	Tommy Gavin	Rescue Me	"Retards"	FX
2007 (59th)	Hugh Laurie	Gregory House	House	"Half-Wit"	Fox
2007 (59th)	James Gandolfini	Tony Soprano	The Sopranos	"The Second Coming"	HBO
2007 (59th)	Kiefer Sutherland	Jack Bauer	24	"Day 6: 5:00 a.m. – 6:00 a.m."	Fox
2008 (60th)
2008 (60th)	Bryan Cranston	Walter White	Breaking Bad	"Pilot"	AMC
2008 (60th)	Gabriel Byrne	Paul Weston	In Treatment	"Week 4: Paul and Gina"	HBO
2008 (60th)	Hugh Laurie	Gregory House	House	"House's Head"	Fox
2008 (60th)	James Spader	Alan Shore	Boston Legal	"The Court Supreme"	ABC
2008 (60th)	Jon Hamm	Don Draper	Mad Men	"The Wheel"	AMC
2008 (60th)	Michael C. Hall	Dexter Morgan	Dexter	"There's Something About Harry"	Showtime
2009 (61st)
2009 (61st)	Bryan Cranston	Walter White	Breaking Bad	"Phoenix"	AMC
2009 (61st)	Gabriel Byrne	Paul Weston	In Treatment	"Week 4: Gina"	HBO
2009 (61st)	Hugh Laurie	Gregory House	House	"Under My Skin"	Fox
2009 (61st)	Jon Hamm	Don Draper	Mad Men	"The Mountain King"	AMC
2009 (61st)	Michael C. Hall	Dexter Morgan	Dexter	"The Lion Sleeps Tonight"	Showtime
2009 (61st)	Simon Baker	Patrick Jane	The Mentalist	"Pilot"	CBS

=== 2010s ===
Year	Actor	Role	Program	Episode Submissions	Network
2010 (62nd)
2010 (62nd)	Bryan Cranston	Walter White	Breaking Bad	"Full Measure"	AMC
2010 (62nd)	Kyle Chandler	Eric Taylor	Friday Night Lights	"East of Dillon"	DirecTV
2010 (62nd)	Matthew Fox	Jack Shephard	Lost	"The End"	ABC
2010 (62nd)	Michael C. Hall	Dexter Morgan	Dexter	"The Getaway"	Showtime
2010 (62nd)	Jon Hamm	Don Draper	Mad Men	"The Gypsy and the Hobo"	AMC
2010 (62nd)	Hugh Laurie	Gregory House	House	"Broken"	Fox
2011 (63rd)
2011 (63rd)	Kyle Chandler	Eric Taylor	Friday Night Lights	"Always"	DirecTV
2011 (63rd)	Steve Buscemi	Nucky Thompson	Boardwalk Empire	"A Return to Normalcy"	HBO
2011 (63rd)	Michael C. Hall	Dexter Morgan	Dexter	"Teenage Wasteland"	Showtime
2011 (63rd)	Jon Hamm	Don Draper	Mad Men	"The Suitcase"	AMC
2011 (63rd)	Hugh Laurie	Gregory House	House	"After Hours"	Fox
2011 (63rd)	Timothy Olyphant	Raylan Givens	Justified	"Reckoning"	FX
2012 (64th)
2012 (64th)	Damian Lewis	Nicholas Brody	Homeland	"Marine One"	Showtime
2012 (64th)	Hugh Bonneville	Robert Crawley	Downton Abbey	"Episode Seven"	PBS
2012 (64th)	Steve Buscemi	Nucky Thompson	Boardwalk Empire	"Two Boats and a Lifeguard"	HBO
2012 (64th)	Bryan Cranston	Walter White	Breaking Bad	"Crawl Space"	AMC
2012 (64th)	Michael C. Hall	Dexter Morgan	Dexter	"Nebraska"	Showtime
2012 (64th)	Jon Hamm	Don Draper	Mad Men	"The Other Woman"	AMC
2013 (65th)
2013 (65th)	Jeff Daniels	Will McAvoy	The Newsroom	"We Just Decided To"	HBO
2013 (65th)	Hugh Bonneville	Robert Crawley	Downton Abbey	"Episode Five"	PBS
2013 (65th)	Bryan Cranston	Walter White	Breaking Bad	"Say My Name"	AMC
2013 (65th)	Jon Hamm	Don Draper	Mad Men	"In Care Of"	AMC
2013 (65th)	Damian Lewis	Nicholas Brody	Homeland	"Q&A"	Showtime
2013 (65th)	Kevin Spacey	Frank Underwood	House of Cards	"Chapter 1"	Netflix
2014 (66th)
2014 (66th)	Bryan Cranston	Walter White	Breaking Bad	"Ozymandias"	AMC
2014 (66th)	Jeff Daniels	Will McAvoy	The Newsroom	"Election Night, Part 2"	HBO
2014 (66th)	Jon Hamm	Don Draper	Mad Men	"The Strategy"	AMC
2014 (66th)	Woody Harrelson	Martin Hart	True Detective	"The Locked Room"	HBO
2014 (66th)	Matthew McConaughey	Rust Cohle	True Detective	"Form and Void"	HBO
2014 (66th)	Kevin Spacey	Frank Underwood	House of Cards	"Chapter 26"	Netflix
2015 (67th)
2015 (67th)	Jon Hamm	Don Draper	Mad Men	"Person to Person"	AMC
2015 (67th)	Kyle Chandler	John Rayburn	Bloodline	"Part 12"	
2015 (67th)	Jeff Daniels	Will McAvoy	The Newsroom	"What Kind of Day Has It Been"	HBO
2015 (67th)	Bob Odenkirk	Jimmy McGill	Better Call Saul	"Pimento"	AMC
2015 (67th)	Liev Schreiber	Ray Donovan	Ray Donovan	"Walk This Way"	Showtime
2015 (67th)	Kevin Spacey	Frank Underwood	House of Cards	"Chapter 32"	Netflix
2016 (68th)					Netflix
2016 (68th)	Rami Malek	Elliot Alderson	Mr. Robot	"eps1.0 hellofriend.mov"	USA Network
2016 (68th)	Kyle Chandler	John Rayburn	Bloodline	"Part 23"	Netflix
2016 (68th)	Bob Odenkirk	Jimmy McGill	Better Call Saul	"Klick"	AMC
2016 (68th)	Matthew Rhys	Philip Jennings	The Americans	"The Magic of David Copperfield V: The Statue of Liberty Disappears"	FX
2016 (68th)	Liev Schreiber	Ray Donovan	Ray Donovan	"Exsuscito"	Showtime
2016 (68th)	Kevin Spacey	Frank Underwood	House of Cards	"Chapter 52"	Netflix
2017 (69th)
2017 (69th)	Sterling K. Brown	Randall Pearson	This Is Us	"Memphis"	NBC
2017 (69th)	Anthony Hopkins	Dr. Robert Ford	Westworld	"The Bicameral Mind"	HBO
2017 (69th)	Bob Odenkirk	Jimmy McGill	Better Call Saul	"Expenses"	AMC
2017 (69th)	Matthew Rhys	Philip Jennings	The Americans	"Crossbreed"	FX
2017 (69th)	Liev Schreiber	Ray Donovan	Ray Donovan	"Rattus Rattus"	Showtime
2017 (69th)	Kevin Spacey	Frank Underwood	House of Cards	"Chapter 53"	Netflix
2017 (69th)	Milo Ventimiglia	Jack Pearson	This Is Us	"Moonshadow"	NBC
2018 (70th)
2018 (70th)	Matthew Rhys	Philip Jennings	The Americans	"START"	FX
2018 (70th)	Jason Bateman	Martin "Marty" Byrde	Ozark	"The Toll"	Netflix
2018 (70th)	Sterling K. Brown	Randall Pearson	This Is Us	"Number Three"	NBC
2018 (70th)	Ed Harris	The Man in Black / William	Westworld	"Vanishing Point"	HBO
2018 (70th)	Milo Ventimiglia	Jack Pearson	This Is Us	"The Car"	NBC
2018 (70th)	Jeffrey Wright	Bernard Lowe	Westworld	"The Passenger"	HBO
2019 (71st)
2019 (71st)	Billy Porter	Pray Tell	Pose	"Love Is the Message"	FX
2019 (71st)	Jason Bateman	Martin "Marty" Byrde	Ozark	"Reparations"	Netflix
2019 (71st)	Sterling K. Brown	Randall Pearson	This Is Us	"R & B"	NBC
2019 (71st)	Kit Harington	Jon Snow	Game of Thrones	"The Iron Throne"	HBO
2019 (71st)	Bob Odenkirk	Jimmy McGill	Better Call Saul	"Winner"	AMC
2019 (71st)	Milo Ventimiglia	Jack Pearson	This Is Us	"Sometimes"	NBC

=== 2020s ===
Year	Actor	Role	Program	Episode Submissions	Network
2020 (72nd)
2020 (72nd)	Jeremy Strong	Kendall Roy	Succession	"This Is Not for Tears"	HBO
2020 (72nd)	Jason Bateman	Marty Byrde	Ozark	"Su Casa Es Mi Casa"	Netflix
2020 (72nd)	Sterling K. Brown	Randall Pearson	This Is Us	"After the Fire"	NBC
2020 (72nd)	Steve Carell	Mitch Kessler	The Morning Show	"Lonely at the Top"	Apple TV+
2020 (72nd)	Brian Cox	Logan Roy	Succession	"Hunting"	HBO
2020 (72nd)	Billy Porter	Pray Tell	Pose	"Love's in Need of Love Today"	FX
2021 (73rd)
2021 (73rd)	Josh O'Connor	Charles, Prince of Wales	The Crown	"Terra Nullius"	Netflix
2021 (73rd)	Sterling K. Brown	Randall Pearson	This Is Us	"Forty: Part 2"	NBC
2021 (73rd)	Jonathan Majors	Atticus Freeman	Lovecraft Country	"Sundown"	HBO
2021 (73rd)	Regé-Jean Page	Simon Bassett	Bridgerton	"Art of the Swoon"	Netflix
2021 (73rd)	Billy Porter	Pray Tell	Pose	"Take Me To Church"	FX
2021 (73rd)	Matthew Rhys	Perry Mason	Perry Mason	"Chapter 8"	HBO
2022 (74th)
2022 (74th)	Lee Jung-jae	Seong Gi-hun	Squid Game	"Gganbu"	Netflix
2022 (74th)	Jason Bateman	Marty Byrde	Ozark	"Pound of Flesh and Still Kickin’"	Netflix
2022 (74th)	Brian Cox	Logan Roy	Succession	"All the Bells Say"	HBO
2022 (74th)	Bob Odenkirk	Jimmy McGill / Saul Goodman	Better Call Saul	"Plan and Execution"	AMC
2022 (74th)	Adam Scott	Mark Scout / Mark S	Severance	"Good News About Hell"	Apple TV+
2022 (74th)	Jeremy Strong	Kendall Roy	Succession	"Too Much Birthday"	HBO
2023 (75th)	Kieran Culkin	Roman Roy	Succession	"Church and State"	HBO
2023 (75th)	Jeff Bridges	Dan Chase	The Old Man	"I"	FX
2023 (75th)	Brian Cox	Logan Roy	Succession	"Rehearsal"	HBO
2023 (75th)	Bob Odenkirk	Jimmy McGill / Saul Goodman / Gene Takovic	Better Call Saul	"Saul Gone"	AMC
2023 (75th)	Pedro Pascal	Joel Miller	The Last of Us	"Kin"	HBO
2023 (75th)	Jeremy Strong	Kendall Roy	Succession	"With Open Eyes"	HBO
2024 (76th)	Hiroyuki Sanada	Lord Yoshii Toranaga	Shōgun	"The Abyss of Life"	FX
2024 (76th)	Idris Elba	Sam Nelson	Hijack	"Comply Slowly"	Apple TV+
2024 (76th)	Donald Glover	John Smith / Michael	Mr. & Mrs. Smith	"Couples Therapy (Naked & Afraid)"	Prime Video
2024 (76th)	Walton Goggins	The Ghoul / Cooper Howard	Fallout	"The Ghouls"	Prime Video
2024 (76th)	Gary Oldman	Jackson Lamb	Slow Horses	"Footprints"	Apple TV+
2024 (76th)	Dominic West	Charles, Prince of Wales	The Crown	"Aftermath"	Netflix
2025 (77th)
2025 (77th)	Noah Wyle	Dr. Michael "Robby" Robinavitch	The Pitt	"9:00 P.M."	HBO Max
2025 (77th)	Sterling K. Brown	Xavier Collins	Paradise	"The Day"	Hulu
2025 (77th)	Gary Oldman	Jackson Lamb	Slow Horses	"Identity Theft"	Apple TV+
2025 (77th)	Pedro Pascal	Joel Miller	The Last of Us	"The Price"	HBO
2025 (77th)	Adam Scott	Mark Scout / Mark S	Severance	"Cold Harbor"	Apple TV+
2026 (78th)
2026 (78th)	Noah Wyle	Dr. Michael "Robby" Robinavitch	The Pitt	"9:00 P.M."	HBO Max
2026 (78th)	Sterling K. Brown	Xavier Collins	Paradise	"A Holy Charge"	Hulu
2026 (78th)	Gary Oldman	Jackson Lamb	Slow Horses	"Tall Tales"	Apple TV
2026 (78th)	Mark Ruffalo	Tom Brandis	Task	"A Still Small Voice"	HBO
2026 (78th)	Rufus Sewell	Hal Wyler	The Diplomat	"Schrodinger's Wife"	Netflix

== Programs with multiple wins ==
4 wins

- Breaking Bad (3 consecutive)
- NYPD Blue (2 consecutive)

3 wins

- Columbo
- I Spy (consecutive)
- The Sopranos (2 consecutive)
- St. Elsewhere (2 consecutive)

2 wins

- Boston Legal
- The Defenders
- Father Knows Best (consecutive)
- Hill Street Blues (consecutive)
- Lou Grant
- Perry Mason
- The Pitt (consecutive)
- Succession

== Programs with multiple nominations ==
14 nominations

- NYPD Blue

10 nominations

- St. Elsewhere

8 nominations

- Columbo
- Law & Order
- Mad Men
- This Is Us

7 nominations

- Succession
- The West Wing

6 nominations

- 24
- Better Call Saul
- Breaking Bad
- ER
- House
- I Spy
- The Sopranos

5 nominations

- Dexter
- The Equalizer
- Hill Street Blues
- House of Cards
- Ironside
- Lou Grant
- Magnum, P.I.
- Quantum Leap
- The Rockford Files

4 nominations

- L.A. Law
- Mannix
- Mission: Impossible
- Ozark
- Quincy, M.E.
- Six Feet Under
- The Streets of San Francisco

3 nominations

- The Americans
- Boston Legal
- Dallas
- The Danny Thomas Show
  (Note: Originally titled "Make Room for Daddy", where the series was nominated twice.)
- Dynasty
- Father Knows Best
- The Fugitive
- Gunsmoke
- The Jackie Gleason Show
- Marcus Welby, M.D.
- The Newsroom
- Perry Mason
- Pose
- Ray Donovan
- Slow Horses
- The Waltons
- Westworld

2 nominations

- Baretta
- Beauty and the Beast
- Bloodline
- Boardwalk Empire
- The Bob Cummings Show
- Cannon
- The Crown
- The Defenders
- The Dick Van Dyke Show
- Downton Abbey
- Dragnet
- Four Star Playhouse
- Friday Night Lights
- Have Gun – Will Travel
- Hennesey
- Homeland
- Homicide: Life on the Street
- I'll Fly Away
- In Treatment
- Kojak
- The Last of Us
- Moonlighting
- Naked City
- Northern Exposure
- Paradise
- The Phil Silvers Show
- Picket Fences
- The Pitt
- The Practice
- Rescue Me
- Run for Your Life
- Severance
- The Shield
- True Detective
- Twin Peaks
- The Untouchables
- The X-Files

== Performers with multiple wins ==
4 wins

- Bryan Cranston (3 consecutive)
- Dennis Franz (2 consecutive)

3 wins

- Bill Cosby (consecutive)
- Peter Falk
- James Gandolfini (2 consecutive)
- James Spader (2 consecutive)
- Robert Young (2 consecutive)

2 wins

- Ed Asner
- Raymond Burr
- William Daniels (consecutive)
- E. G. Marshall (consecutive)
- Daniel J. Travanti (consecutive)
- Noah Wyle (consecutive)

== Performers with multiple nominations ==
8 nominations

- Raymond Burr*
- Peter Falk*
- Dennis Franz*
- Jon Hamm*

7 nominations

- Sterling K. Brown*
- James Garner*

6 nominations

- Bryan Cranston*
- James Gandolfini*
- Michael C. Hall
- Hugh Laurie
- Bob Odenkirk
- Martin Sheen
- Kiefer Sutherland*
- Robert Young*

5 nominations

- Ed Asner*
- William Daniels*
- Ed Flanders*
- Tom Selleck*
- Jimmy Smits
- Kevin Spacey
- Daniel J. Travanti*
- Sam Waterston
- Edward Woodward

4 nominations

- Scott Bakula
- Jason Bateman
- Richard Boone
- Kyle Chandler*
- Mike Connors
- Anthony Edwards
- Jack Klugman
- Karl Malden
- Michael Moriarty
- Matthew Rhys*
- James Spader*

3 nominations

- James Arness
- Andre Braugher*
- Bill Cosby*
- Brian Cox
- Robert Culp
- Jeff Daniels*
- John Forsythe
- David Janssen
- Peter Krause
- Martin Landau
- Gary Oldman
- Billy Porter*
- Liev Schreiber
- Jeremy Strong*
- Milo Ventimiglia

2 nominations

- Corbin Bernsen
- Robert Blake*
- Hugh Bonneville
- Paul Burke
- Steve Buscemi
- Gabriel Byrne
- Michael Chiklis*
- George Clooney
- William Conrad
- Jackie Cooper
- David Duchovny
- Ben Gazzara
- Larry Hagman
- Denis Leary
- Damian Lewis*
- Kyle MacLachlan
- E. G. Marshall*
- Rob Morrow
- Pedro Pascal
- Ron Perlman
- Telly Savalas*
- Adam Scott
- Tom Skerritt*
- Robert Stack*
- Richard Thomas*
- Michael Tucker
- Jack Webb
- Bruce Willis*
- Noah Wyle*

(*) refers to those who have won in this category

== Superlatives ==
Superlative	Performer	Program	Year	Age
Oldest Winner	Richard Kiley	A Year in the Life	1988 (40th)	66
Oldest Nominee	Anthony Hopkins	Westworld	2017 (69th)	79
Youngest Winner	Richard Thomas	The Waltons	1973 (25th)	21
Youngest Nominee	Richard Thomas	The Waltons	1973 (25th)	21

== See also ==
- Actor Award for Outstanding Performance by a Male Actor in a Drama Series
- Best Actor
- Critics' Choice Television Award for Best Actor in a Drama Series
- Golden Globe Award for Best Actor – Television Series Drama
- List of acting awards
- List of television awards for Best Actor
- Primetime Emmy Award for Outstanding Lead Actor in a Comedy Series
- Primetime Emmy Award for Outstanding Lead Actress in a Comedy Series
- Primetime Emmy Award for Outstanding Supporting Actor in a Comedy Series
- Primetime Emmy Award for Outstanding Supporting Actress in a Comedy Series
- Primetime Emmy Award for Outstanding Lead Actress in a Drama Series
- Primetime Emmy Award for Outstanding Supporting Actor in a Drama Series
- Primetime Emmy Award for Outstanding Supporting Actress in a Drama Series
- Primetime Emmy Award for Outstanding Lead Actor in a Limited or Anthology Series or Movie
- Primetime Emmy Award for Outstanding Lead Actress in a Limited or Anthology Series or Movie
- Primetime Emmy Award for Outstanding Supporting Actor in a Limited or Anthology Series or Movie
- Primetime Emmy Award for Outstanding Supporting Actress in a Limited or Anthology Series or Movie
- TCA Award for Individual Achievement in Drama
