= Angelique Mott =

Ojibwe survivalist

Angelique Mott was an Ojibwe woman who, during the Michigan copper rush of 1845-46, survived for nearly a year while stranded on Isle Royale alongside her husband.

== Background and biography ==
Humans haven't historically settled year-round on Isle Royale; for about three thousand years, Native Americans used the land for copper and fish. These Native Americans usually limited their visiting to the island in the summer, and nineteenth-century Americans did the same.

Angelique and her French husband Charlie Mott, who was a voyageur and fur trader, were left on Isle Royale as hires for Cyrus Mendenhall and the Lake Superior Copper Company. Angelique was reportedly 17 years old at the time. They were hired and carried from their home in La Pointe, Wisconsin to Isle Royale by Mendenhall's schooner, the "Algonquin", to scout for copper. Angelique found a large mass of copper ore, which she and her husband were hired to stay and guard until a barge could come to retrieve it, promised in no more than 3 months' time. They were dropped off on July 1, 1845, and were left stranded there until the following Spring. They were left with minimal provisions, which consisted of a half-barrel of flour, six pounds of butter, and some beans. A supply boat was promised to arrive after the first few weeks, but it was never sent out.

Angelique and her husband were left to survive in the wilderness with limited supplies, on an island with scarce resources. They lost their canoe in a fall storm, and their fishing net was destroyed. By January 1846, Charlie went mad with hunger and even threatened to kill and eat Angelique. He eventually returned to his senses but remained in poor health, and eventually died from starvation. Angelique left his body in their cabin and created a brush shelter for herself to live in. She survived by eating poplar bark, bitter berries, and by pulling out her own hair, braiding the strands, and creating snares with it to catch rabbits. In the Spring of 1846, the Algonquin returned, and brought Angelique back to her mother. After her rescue, she became a housemaid for one of the largest mine owners in Marquette.

Mott died in 1874, in Sault Ste. Marie, Ontario, Canada.

== Aftermath ==
The full events were chronicled in a footnote as told by Angelique in the first printing of a book called The Honorable Peter White by Ralph D. Williams in 1907; Angelique's story was pulled from the subsequent printing, thus making it the only written record that survives.

== In popular culture ==
Angelique's story served as the main inspiration for the 2018 Canadian historical drama film Angelique's Isle, in which she was portrayed by Julia Jones. She was additionally the subject of the 2010 novella Angelique Abandoned by James R. Stevens.
