= Angelique's Isle =

Canadian historical drama film

- Film poster
- Directed by: Marie-Hélène Cousineau; Michelle Derosier
- Written by: Michelle Derosier
- Based on: Angelique Abandoned by James R. Stevens
- Produced by: Amos Adetuyi; Dave Clement; Michelle Derosier; Floyd Kane
- Starring: Julia Jones; Charlie Carrick; Tantoo Cardinal
- Cinematography: Celiana Cárdenas
- Edited by: Wiebke von Carolsfeld
- Music by: Darren Fung
- Production companies: Circle Blue Entertainment; Freddie Films; Thunderstone Pictures
- Release date: September 19, 2018 (AFF)
- Running time: 90 minutes
- Country: Canada
- Language: English
- Box office: $5,801

Angelique's Isle is a 2018 Canadian historical drama film, directed by Marie-Hélène Cousineau and Michelle Derosier. Based on a true story set in 1845, the film stars Julia Jones as Angelique Mott, an Anishinaabe woman who accompanies her voyageur husband Charlie (Charlie Carrick) on an expedition to search for potential mining sites during the Copper Rush, only for the couple to be abandoned on an island in Lake Superior and forced to survive the harsh winter on their own.

The film's cast also includes Tantoo Cardinal, Aden Young, Stephen McHattie, Brendt Thomas Diabo, Greg Tremblay, Anthony Roch and Dennis Dubinsky.

The film premiered at the Atlantic Film Festival in September 2018, before going into commercial release in 2019.

It won three awards at the 2018 American Indian Film Festival, for Best Film, Best Actress (Jones) and Best Supporting Actress (Cardinal).

== Cast ==
- Aden Young as Cyrus Mendenhall
- Brendt Thomas Diabo as Rene Cadotte
- Charlie Carrick as Charlie Mott
- Dennis Dubinsky as Minister
- Greg Tremblay as Antoine Mott
- Gabe Ferrazzo as Priest
- Julia Jones as Angelique Mott
- Tantoo Cardinal as Green Thunderbird Woman
- Stephen McHattie as Mackay
