= Kiksuya =

- Westworld episode
- Episode no.: Season 2 Episode 8
- Directed by: Uta Briesewitz
- Written by: Carly Wray; Dan Dietz
- Cinematography by: Darran Tiernan
- Editing by: David Eisenberg
- Production code: 208
- Original air date: June 10, 2018
- Running time: 59 minutes

Guest appearances
- Ben Barnes as Logan; Julia Jones as Kohana; Martin Sensmeier as Wahaton; Irene Bedard as Wichapi; Booboo Stewart as Etu

Episode chronology
← Previous "Les Écorchés"	Next → "Vanishing Point"

"Kiksuya" is the eighth episode in the second season of the HBO science fiction western thriller television series Westworld. The episode aired on June 10, 2018. It was written by Carly Wray and Dan Dietz and was directed by Uta Briesewitz.

The title is Lakota for "Remember", and the majority of the dialogue in the episode is in Lakota. The episode received much critical acclaim and cited as one of the series' best episodes.

== Plot summary ==
Akecheta of the Ghost Nation recovers the injured William, and keeps guard over him. Seeing Maeve's daughter scared of William, Akecheta realizes she has memories of her past narratives, and tells her his own story to reassure her.

Akecheta had started as a peaceful host with his partner Kohana. Witnessing the aftermath of Wyatt's massacre of the hosts under Arnold's orders, Akecheta finds the symbol of the maze and starts down the path of sentience. He is reprogrammed to be a bloodthirsty warrior but the park staff decide against wiping his memories. Akecheta finds a delirious Logan Delos, who inadvertently tells him of a world outside the park, confirming to Akecheta that something is amiss. His search leads him to the giant excavation site in the Valley Beyond, which he believes is a door to another world. Akecheta takes Kohana and helps her recover her memories of him. He tries to show her the door, but cannot find it again. (Note: The excavation was for the construction of the Forge (see "Vanishing Point"), which had been completed and covered over by the time Akecheta returned with Kohana.) Kohana is taken by Delos technicians and when Akecheta returns to the Ghost Nation, he finds a new host in her place.

Akecheta continues to search for the Valley Beyond and Kohana, meeting Maeve's daughter in the process, and later allowing guests to kill him so that he can travel to the Mesa—which the Ghost Nation believe to be the afterlife—to reunite with Kohana. The staff dismiss his errant behavior as a result of not having received software updates in a decade. Akecheta sneaks out to explore the Mesa and discovers Kohana has been decommissioned. Once returned to the park, Akecheta begins raids against the host population, recruiting them to join him in his search and starting them on their own path to sentience, thus explaining the Maze symbol which William found outside Maeve's house after killing her and her daughter. His actions attract the attention of Dr. Ford, who arranges to speak to Akecheta. Ford prepares Akecheta to take his recruits to the Valley Beyond when Dolores (whom Akecheta referred to as "the Deathbringer") rebels against the guests and staff. Akecheta completes his story as Emily arrives at the Ghost Nation camp. She has him turn William over to her, promising that he will suffer more with her than with the Ghost Nation.

Elsewhere, Lee convinces a technician to keep Maeve stable, explaining her ability to control other hosts. Charlotte discovers Maeve does this by rewriting their programming over the hosts' network, and may be key to regaining control of Westworld. However, she is concerned that Maeve is communicating with unknown hosts that moment. It is shown Akecheta has been actually relaying his story to Maeve through her daughter. Akecheta promises Maeve he will protect her daughter, and instructs her to fulfill her mission before Dolores destroys them all. The Ghost Nation set off for the Valley Beyond.

== Production ==
Zahn McClarnon, who plays Akecheta, is credited as part of the starring cast for this episode. He was previously credited as a recurring character, first appearing in "Reunion." McClarnon is part Lakota and Standing Rock Sioux and was able to contribute knowledge of his heritage to help develop the character of Akecheta and the Ghost Nation tribe. Nolan and Joy had established the Ghost Nation as a fictional Native American tribe conceived by Dr. Ford, giving McClarnon freedom to vary from traditions in his performance. However, Nolan and Joy wanted to make sure that the Lakota language spoken by the Ghost Nation throughout the episode was proper, so they brought in Larry Pouier, an expert in the Lakota people, and Cordelia White Elk, a fluent speaker of Lakota. Daniel TwoFeathers, who plays a Ghost Nation Warrior, is a Sundancer, part Lakota and speaks fluent Lakota. Daniel also provided the Lakota translation, typed it phonetically, and provided the on-set dialog coaching for the actors, to ensure the precision of the dialogue. Akecheta's makeup took about two and a half hours each day, with frequent touch-ups of the facial paint. Ghost Nation hair styling was done by Bruce Samia.

American actor Booboo Stewart, who portrayed a Lakota character in American Satan and Paradise City, and who himself is of Blackfoot descent, also features in the episode as Etu.

Filming of parts of the episode was done in Utah.

=== Music ===
The scene in which Akecheta finds the decommissioned Kohana in the Mesa's cold storage area is accompanied by a piano cover of Nirvana's "Heart-Shaped Box" arranged by Ramin Djawadi. A more orchestral arrangement was previously used for the second full trailer of the second season. Both versions are included in the official soundtrack of the season.

== Reception ==
"Kiksuya" was watched by 1.44 million viewers on its initial viewing, and received a 0.6 18–49 rating, marking an improvement from the previous week.

The episode received critical acclaim. At Rotten Tomatoes, the episode has a 95% approval rating with an average score of 9.34/10 from 38 reviews, with the critical consensus stating, "Zahn McClarnon delivers a formidable, heart wrenching performance, elevating 'Kiksuya' from Westworld's frequent philosophical filler to one of the best episodes of the entire series."
