= A Private Life (Six Feet Under) =

- Six Feet Under episode
- Episode no.: Season 1 Episode 12
- Directed by: Rodrigo García
- Written by: Kate Robin
- Cinematography by: Alan Caso
- Editing by: Michael Ruscio
- Original release date: August 19, 2001
- Running time: 60 minutes

Guest appearances
- Eric Balfour as Gabe; Brian Poth as Marcus Foster Jr.; Joel Brooks as Robbie; Arthur Taxier as Marcus Foster Sr.; Joan McMurtrey as Patsy Foster

Episode chronology
← Previous "The Trip"	Next → "Knock, Knock"

"A Private Life" is the twelfth episode of the first season of the American drama television series Six Feet Under. The episode was written by Kate Robin, and directed by Rodrigo García. It originally aired on HBO on August 19, 2001, airing back-to-back with the follow-up episode, "Knock, Knock".

The series is set in Los Angeles, and depicts the lives of the Fisher family, who run a funeral home, along with their friends and lovers. It explores the conflicts that arise after the family's patriarch, Nathaniel, dies in a car accident. In the episode, David is conflicted with his homosexuality while embalming the corpse of a gay man, while Brenda's relationship with Billy dwindles.

According to Nielsen Media Research, the episode was seen by an estimated 6.67 million household viewers and gained a Nielsen household rating of 4.3. The episode received critical acclaim, who praised the performances, themes, storylines and writing. For the episode, Michael C. Hall received a nomination for Outstanding Lead Actor in a Drama Series at the 54th Primetime Emmy Awards.

== Plot ==
A gay couple is retrieving money from the ATM, when a car pulls up next to them. The drivers are offended by their sexuality and intimidate them, forcing them to flee in different directions. One of them, Marcus Foster Jr. (Brian Poth), is eventually caught and brutally beaten by the thugs. After killing him, they flee the scene.

Marcus' family visits Fisher & Sons to arrange the funeral, with David (Michael C. Hall) feeling uncomfortable with Marcus' father's homophobic remarks. He asks Federico (Freddy Rodriguez) to take the day off so he can work on embalming Marcus' corpse himself. During this, David begins to imagine conversing with Marcus, who claims he chose the wrong path in life. When Federico checks on the corpse, David comes out after Federico criticizes gay people leaving their condolences. Federico does not take it well, believing that they "don't leave their wife and kids." Ruth (Frances Conroy) tries to get David to come out to her, but he does not do it. She asks her gay coworker Robbie (Joel Brooks) how he came out to his mother, and he tells her that it was painful and he does not owe it to her to tell her the story.

Brenda (Rachel Griffiths) confronts Billy (Jeremy Sisto) for photographing her and Nate (Peter Krause), and orders him to give her his key to her house. When she tells Nate, he believes she was not harsh enough on him, upsetting her and breaking up with him. Later, Nate arrives at a loft to pick up a corpse, but is shocked to find that the place belongs to Billy, who photographed Claire and also followed Nate and Brenda having sex. He finds a blanket, believing that Billy slit his wrists, only to find that it was a prank staged by Billy. Claire (Lauren Ambrose) and Gabe (Eric Balfour) return to high school, where Gabe is still mocked for his overdose. Claire is concerned that Gabe's overdose was not an accident, and upon the suggestion of her counselor, decides to show he can count on her.

During Marcus' funeral, Keith (Mathew St. Patrick) is assigned to watch over homophobic protestors outside. David attacks one of the prostestors and apologizes to Keith for feeling ashamed of their relationship. That night, he finally comes out to Ruth. While upset that he waited so long, she accepts him for who he is. Brenda is visited by Billy, who reveals he has removed his tattoo on his lower back of the name "Isabel" by cutting off his own skin. He tries to remove Brenda's matching tattoo, but she is able to knock him unconscious and call an ambulance. Agitated, she finally agrees to commit Billy to an institution. While sleeping, David is once again tormented by the hallucination of Marcus, and prays to God for guidance.

== Production ==
=== Development ===
The episode was written by Kate Robin, and directed by Rodrigo García. This was Robin's first writing credit, and García's second directing credit.

== Reception ==
=== Viewers ===
In its original American broadcast, "A Private Life" was seen by an estimated 6.67 million household viewers with a household rating of 4.3. This means that it was seen by 4.3% of the nation's estimated households, and was watched by 4.38 million households. This was a 54% increase in viewership from the previous episode, which was watched by 4.33 million household viewers with a household rating of 4.0.

=== Critical reviews ===
"A Private Life" received critical acclaim. John Teti of The A.V. Club wrote, "Even though [Ruth] doesn't know how to take care of her kids, she can always cook for them. Whenever she can see they're hurting, she offers to make them something to eat."

Entertainment Weekly gave the episode an "A–" grade, and wrote, "Somber without becoming ponderous, ”Life” allows Joel Brooks' delightfully bitchy Robbie his first real chance to shine, as he counsels Ruth about dealing with her gay son. Hall and Conroy play the coming-out scene with masterful subtlety. Why haven't these two won Emmys yet?" Mark Zimmer of Digitally Obsessed gave the episode a perfect 5 out of 5 rating, writing "A tense, deep and moving episode that really calls on the cast to bring forth some difficult emotions. Excellent work."

TV Tome gave the episode a perfect 10 out of 10 rating and wrote "There aren't as many pieces of episodic TV that leave me emotionally exhausted but this one of the very few. I swear to God it's type of episode that once you've seen it you need to see again and again because it's such powerful television at it's [sic] ultimate best. If next week's episode, the season finale is half as good it'll worth watching." Billie Doux of Doux Reviews gave the episode a perfect 4 out of 4 stars and wrote "Exceptional episode." Television Without Pity gave the episode an "A" grade.

In 2016, Ross Bonaime of Paste ranked it 14th out of all 63 Six Feet Under episodes and wrote, "As the episode where David finally comes out to his mother, “A Private Life” runs the risk of feeling like a “very special episode” of Six Feet Under. But in taking on David's sexuality in this way, Six Feet Under presents several different reactions, including the extreme — those who won't tolerate his lifestyle — and those who are completely accepting. By bringing back the dead characters talk to the living, we see David's internal struggle between who he is and who he believes God wants him to be, in a way that is still rarely seen in entertainment. “A Private Life” also brings the battle of Brenda and her brother Billy to a head, as she finally decides to commit him after he cuts off his tattoo in her honor. As the penultimate episode of Six Feet Under's first season, “A Private Life” is quite dark — even for this show — but there's a light of hope in the future as our characters finally take steps towards becoming the people they should be."

=== Accolades ===
Michael C. Hall submitted the episode to support his nomination for Outstanding Lead Actor in a Drama Series at the 54th Primetime Emmy Awards. He would respectively lose to Michael Chiklis for The Shield.
