= Knock, Knock (Six Feet Under) =

- Six Feet Under episode
- Episode no.: Season 1 Episode 13
- Directed by: Alan Ball
- Written by: Alan Ball
- Cinematography by: Alan Caso
- Editing by: Tanya Swerling
- Original release date: August 19, 2001
- Running time: 60 minutes

Guest appearances
- Ed Begley Jr. as Hiram Gunderson; Richard Jenkins as Nathaniel Fisher Sr.; Ed O'Ross as Nikolai; Dina Spybey as Tracy Montrose Blair; Eric Balfour as Gabe; Tim Maculan as Father Jack; Marina Black as Parker; Timm Sharp as Andy

Episode chronology
← Previous "A Private Life"	Next → "In the Game"

"Knock, Knock" is the thirteenth episode and season finale of the first season of the American drama television series Six Feet Under. The episode was written and directed by series creator Alan Ball. It originally aired on HBO on August 19, 2001, airing back-to-back with the previous episode, "A Private Life".

The series is set in Los Angeles, and depicts the lives of the Fisher family, who run a funeral home, along with their friends and lovers. It explores the conflicts that arise after the family's patriarch, Nathaniel, dies in a car accident. In the episode, David helps Tracy with her aunt's funeral, while Nate and Brenda get involved in a car accident.

According to Nielsen Media Research, the episode was seen by an estimated 7.06 million household viewers and gained a Nielsen household rating of 4.5, making it the most watched episode of the series. The episode received highly positive reviews from critics, who praised the performances, character development and themes.

== Plot ==
Matthew Gilardi (Gary Hershberger) is playing golf with a woman, Mrs. Huntley, who is overseeing Kroehner. Huntley is very demanding with her methods, and wants Gilardi to comply. When she hits a golf ball, the ball falls off the course. It hits a woman, Lilian Montrose, in the head, killing her.

A devastated Tracy (Dina Spybey) visits Fisher & Sons, revealing that Lilian was her aunt. While she gives specifications to David (Michael C. Hall), he is frustrated that she keeps changing the arrangements, as she has not signed the contract that prevents it from happening. Nate (Peter Krause) takes Brenda (Rachel Griffiths) to visit Billy (Jeremy Sisto) at the institution. Billy laments almost hurting Brenda, and believes he will never leave the institution. On the drive home, Brenda confronts Nate about their journey as a couple, but she accidentally crashes the car. They are taken by an ambulance, with Brenda suffering severe injuries.

While preparing to meet with Hiram (Ed Begley Jr.), Ruth (Frances Conroy) is confronted by Nikolai (Ed O'Ross) as he wants her to work that night. When she protests, he fires her. During their date, Hiram reveals he met a woman and he wants to pursue her. Ruth understands his decision, telling him to go for it. She returns with Nikolai, and they argue until they kiss and have sex. Brenda's condition improves, but the doctor is worried over Nate's brain scan. He discovers that Nate has an arteriovenous malformation, and notes this could lead to his death if not treated.

During a meeting with the deacons, David finds that one of the members is infuriated that Father Jack (Tim Maculan) is planning to wed two lesbians, and wants him expelled. David confesses his homosexuality and later drinks with Father Jack to support his decision, but finds that Jack will not go forward with more weddings and asks David to resign his deaconship. David shares his frustrations with Keith (Mathew St. Patrick), who understands his predicament, but reiterates they are just friends. Later, David imagines finally finding pride in his sexuality, coming to peace with himself.

Claire (Lauren Ambrose) and Gabe (Eric Balfour) attend a party at Parker's house while her parents are out. Gabe leaves with his friends to buy beer, but shocks them by actually pulling a gun and robbing the store. When Tracy once again visits the family to change arrangements, Nate confronts her and forces her to sign the contract. Nevertheless, he consoles her when she is unable to look at her aunt for the funeral. Federico (Freddy Rodriguez) hosts a christening party for Augusto at the house, inviting the Fishers to accompany him. Nate stares at his family, feeling content with his life. Nathaniel (Richard Jenkins) watches this from afar, and he goes upstairs.

== Production ==
=== Development ===
The episode was written and directed by series creator Alan Ball. This was Ball's third writing credit, and second directing credit.

== Reception ==
=== Viewers ===
In its original American broadcast, "Knock, Knock" was seen by an estimated 7.06 million household viewers with a household rating of 4.5. This means that it was seen by 4.5% of the nation's estimated households, and was watched by 4.64 million households. This was a 5% increase in viewership from the previous episode, which was watched by 6.67 million household viewers with a household rating of 4.3.

=== Critical reviews ===
"Knock, Knock" received highly positive reviews from critics. John Teti of The A.V. Club wrote, "Nate may know he's lucky; Nathaniel knows it even better. In death, he has a better perspective on life than anyone who's still on the inside. The inescapable irony, of course, is that his superior viewpoint goes hand-in-hand with an impossible distance. He doesn't get to be part of the joy that he now can understand so well. As he must, Nathaniel walks up the stairs and out of our view."

Entertainment Weekly gave the episode a "B" grade, and wrote, "Despite melodramatic twists (Nate's health scare, Gabe's gunplay), the first-season finale is a relatively low-key affair. But even without major cliff-hangers, the episode dangles enough loose ends to sustain fans' interest for season 2." Mark Zimmer of Digitally Obsessed gave the episode a perfect 5 out of 5 rating, writing "A fine conclusion to an excellent first season."

TV Tome gave the episode a 9 out of 10 rating and wrote "You could probably argue that last week's episode may have been the better candidate in terms of a season ender, but "Knock, Knock" definitely holds it own." Billie Doux of Doux Reviews gave the episode a perfect 4 out of 4 stars and wrote "This was a wonderful season ender, so full of emotion and promise and confusion." Television Without Pity gave the episode an "A–" grade.

In 2016, Ross Bonaime of Paste ranked it 20th out of all 63 Six Feet Under episodes and wrote, "Six Feet Under's first season finale shows us the incredible amount of growth all of the characters experienced in the six month span of time that passed since the pilot. David, Ruth and Claire are much more in tune with what they want in their lives, and are willing to stand up for it. But Nate is the most changed. After discovering a problem within his brain that will become fatal years later, he seems far more content with family and loved ones, even seeming prepared for marriage and open to religion. At the beginning of this season, everyone was motivated by the overwhelming fear of death, but in “Knock, Knock,” everyone is finally motivated by the potential that life has. As Nate puts it, death exists to make life all the more special."
