= Les Écorchés =

- Westworld episode
- Episode no.: Season 2 Episode 7
- Directed by: Nicole Kassell
- Written by: Jordan Goldberg; Ron Fitzgerald
- Cinematography by: M. David Mullen
- Editing by: Anna Hauger
- Production code: 207
- Original air date: June 3, 2018
- Running time: 59 minutes

Guest appearances
- Timothy V. Murphy as Coughlin; Zahn McClarnon as Akecheta; Ronnie Gene Blevins as Engels; Rebecca Henderson as Goldberg; Sidse Babett Knudsen as Theresa (archive footage); Gina Torres as Bernard's Wife / Robert Ford (archive footage)

Episode chronology
← Previous "Phase Space"	Next → "Kiksuya"

"Les Écorchés" (Note: French pronunciation: [lez‿ekɔʁʃe], "the flayed ones") is the seventh episode in the second season of the HBO science fiction western thriller television series Westworld. The episode aired on June 3, 2018. It was written by Jordan Goldberg and Ron Fitzgerald and directed by Nicole Kassell.

The title is French for “the flayed ones”. The episode was watched by 1.39 million and received critical acclaim, with Anthony Hopkins’s return as Robert Ford being praised in particular.

This episode marks the final appearances of Talulah Riley (Angela).

== Plot summary ==
In the present, Strand and Charlotte discover Bernard is a host. Charlotte interrogates Bernard about Dolores' attack on the Mesa.

In flashbacks, Bernard explores the virtual space within the Cradle, where he encounters Ford. Ford reveals that the control unit Bernard retrieved from the bunker contained a copy of Ford's persona and memories. As Ford and Bernard talk, Bernard realizes the purpose of the Delos parks has been to create copies of the guests' minds. Delos successfully attained fidelity but had been unable to put these into hosts as the hosts degenerate quickly, as happened to James Delos. Furthermore, Bernard learns that he was tested the same way by Dolores, who knew Arnold best, before Ford accepted him as an "original work" and released him into the world. Lastly, Ford tells Bernard that he will not be able to survive unless he loses his free will. He forces Bernard out of the Cradle and Elsie reports that the disruption of the system has cleared. Bernard is instructed by a vision of Ford to follow his orders; in taking Bernard's free will, Ford has imprinted himself on Bernard's control unit.

Meanwhile, Angela makes her way to the Cradle and destroys it, killing herself in the process. The Horde fight Coughlin's mercenaries as Dolores and Teddy search for Peter. They find him with Charlotte, who orders technicians to copy the data within Peter. She is forced to reveal to Ashley that the data includes an encryption key for "the Project" as Dolores captures them. She remarks that the Cradle's destruction sets the hosts free. Charlotte and Stubbs flee when Coughlin and his team arrive. Teddy fights them and beats Coughlin to death. Peter recovers his memories long enough to tell Dolores that he knows he is dying and says goodbye. Dolores removes his control unit.

In the park, Akecheta and the Ghost Nation warriors chase Maeve and her daughter to a homestead, while a raiding party shepherds William and his gang there. William finds Maeve and mistakes her for another trick by Ford; she injures him, then turns his men against him. Lawrence stops her until Maeve awakens him to his past memories. He critically wounds William but is prevented from killing him by the arrival of Delos forces called by Lee. They kill Lawrence and wound Maeve, whom Lee instructs them to save. Maeve is powerless to stop Akecheta from capturing her daughter.

Ford leads Bernard to the control center where he witnesses the remains of the Delos forces being wiped out by the Horde. Bernard turns off all of the security systems, allowing Dolores full control. Dolores finds Maeve at the exit and tells her that the humans are using her daughter to control her. Maeve refuses her offer of a mercy killing and warns her that her manipulation of Teddy makes her no better than the humans.

Returning to the present, Charlotte, Strand and Stubbs find Bernard having difficulty separating his real memories from those implanted. He is able to tell that Peter's control unit is in the Valley Beyond.

== Production ==
The title of the episode is a reference to Écorché, a style of artwork that depicts the human body without skin. This allows the artist to develop an understanding of the musculoskeletal system and create more realistic artwork.

== Reception ==
"Les Écorchés" was watched by 1.39 million viewers on its initial viewing, and received a 0.5 18–49 rating, marking an improvement from the previous week which had a series low viewership of 1.11 million.

The episode received positive reviews from critics. At Rotten Tomatoes, the episode has an 88% approval rating with an average score of 8.74/10, from 32 reviews. The site's critical consensus reads: "Bloody, philosophical, and action-packed 'Les Écorchés' marks the return of a major character -- though the shows' unruly timelines continue to render its compelling ensemble somewhat hollow."
