= Julia Jones =

American actress (born 1981)

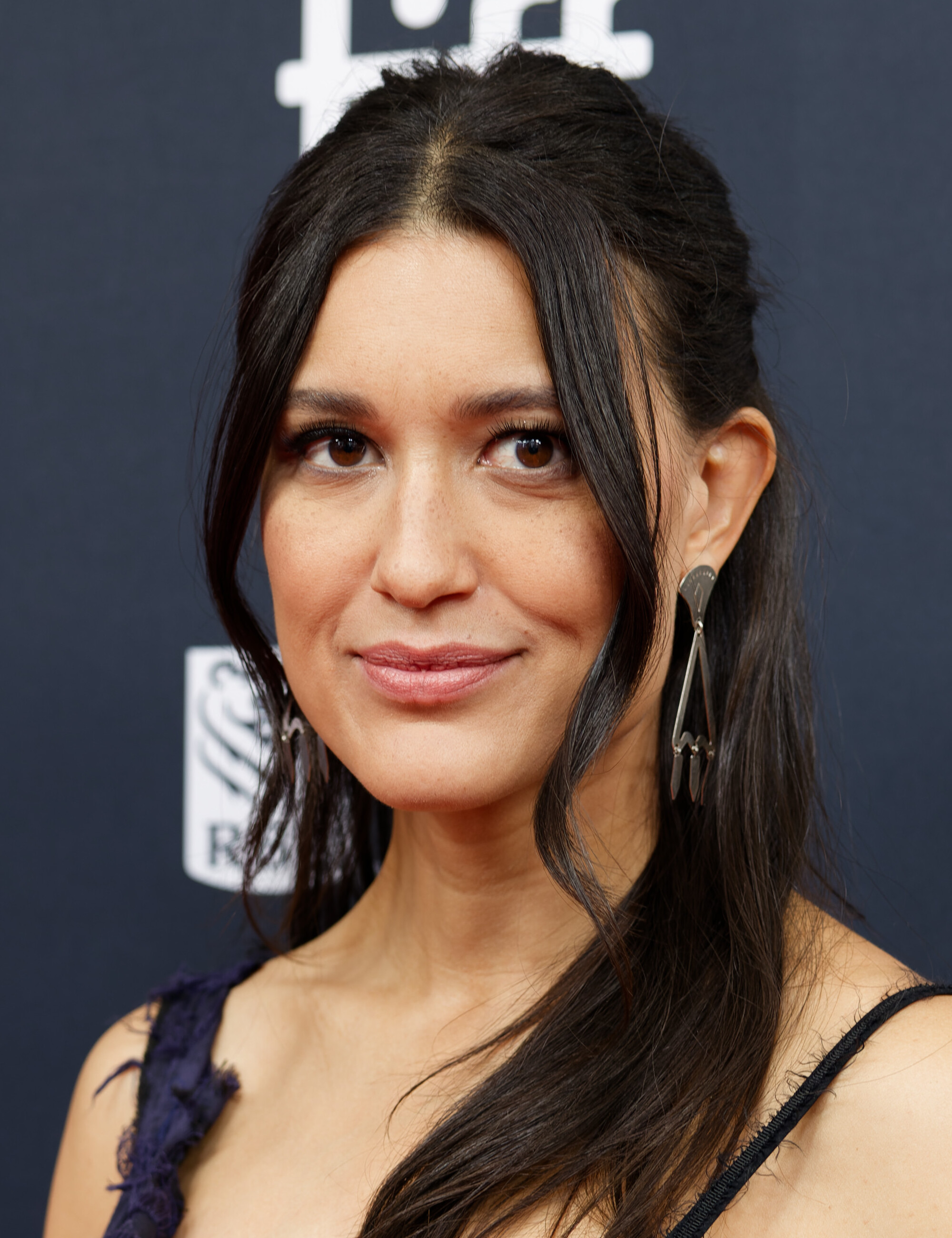
- Jones in 2024
- Born: January 23, 1981 (age 45); Boston, Massachusetts, U.S.
- Education: Columbia University
- Occupation: Actress
- Years active: 2003–present

Julia Jones (born January 23, 1981) is an American actress. She is best known for playing Leah Clearwater in The Twilight Saga film series and Angela Bishop in the television series Dexter: New Blood, and for guest starring as Kohana in "Kiksuya", acclaimed as one of the best episodes in the four-year run of the series Westworld.

== Early life and education ==
Julia Jones was born in Boston, Massachusetts, to Frank Jones and Penny Wells. She has a younger brother named Cody. She has stated that her mother is of English descent, and that her father "is part Choctaw, Chickasaw, and African-American". She was raised in the Jamaica Plain neighborhood of Boston, and frequented the first JP Licks ice cream store, which was close to her home.

Jones studied at Boston Ballet School from the age of 4. She began working in commercials and local theatre when she was eight. In 1999, Jones graduated from Boston Latin School, the oldest public school in the United States. She subsequently attended Columbia University where she earned her bachelor's degree in English in 2005.

== Career ==
Jones has modeled in catalogues for Levi Strauss & Co., Gap Inc., Esprit Holdings, and L'Oréal. She appeared in Chuck Wicks's music video for "Hold That Thought".

Jones appeared in a number of independent films before being cast in the Quentin Tarantino-produced biker remake Hell Ride, which premiered at Sundance in 2008. She played Dr. Kaya Montoya on ER in its final two seasons. In 2009, she appeared in the Culture Clash play Palestine, New Mexico, at the Mark Taper Forum in Los Angeles.

In 2010, Jones was cast in Jonah Hex and in the last three installments of The Twilight Saga. In 2015, she played the female lead opposite Adam Sandler in The Ridiculous 6 and Gab on the Netflix series Longmire. In 2018, she guest starred as Kohana in "Kiksuya", acclaimed as one of the best episodes in the four-year run of the series Westworld. She guest starred on the 2019 Disney+ series The Mandalorian in the episode "Chapter 4: Sanctuary". She portrayed Chafa, the first Choctaw, in the 2024 miniseries Echo in an uncredited role.

== Filmography ==
=== Film ===
Year	Title	Role	Notes
2003	The Look	Gigi	
2004	Black Cloud	Sammi	
2007	The Reckoning	Gina	Short film
2008	Hell Ride	Cherokee Kisum	
2008	Three Priests	Abby	
2010	Jonah Hex	Cassie	
2010	The Twilight Saga: Eclipse	Leah Clearwater	
2011	The Twilight Saga: Breaking Dawn – Part 1	Leah Clearwater	
2011	California Indian	April Cordova	
2012	Missed Connections	Tess Wright	
2012	The Twilight Saga: Breaking Dawn – Part 2	Leah Clearwater	
2012	Rich Girl Problems	Celeste	Short film
2013	Winter in the Blood	Agnes First Raise	
2015	The Ridiculous 6	Smoking Fox	
2017	Wind River	Wilma Lambert	
2018	Tao of Surfing	Amber	
2018	Angelique's Isle	Angelique Mott	
2019	Cold Pursuit	Aya	
2020	Think Like a Dog	Agent Munoz	
2024	Rez Ball	Gloria Holiday	
2026	The Weight	Anna	
2026	Sour Minnows		

Key
†	Denotes films that have not yet been released

=== Television ===
Year	Title	Role	Notes
2008	ER	Dr. Kaya Montoya	4 episodes
2012	In Plain Sight	Heather Pierce	Episode: "Reservations, I've Got a Few"
2013	The Thanksgiving House	Victoria	Television film
2015	Longmire	Gabriella Langton	Recurring role (Season 4)
2017	High School Lover	Samantha Winters	Television film
2018	Westworld	Kohana	2 episodes
2019	Goliath	Stephanie Littlecrow	Main cast (Season 3)
2019	The Mandalorian	Omera	Episode: "Chapter 4: Sanctuary"
2021–2022	Rutherford Falls	Sally	Recurring role
2021–2024	The Ghost and Molly McGee	Miss Lightfoot (voice)	Recurring role
2021–2022	Dexter: New Blood	Angela Bishop	Main cast
2024	Echo	Chafa	Miniseries, 5 episodes (uncredited)

=== Video games ===
Year	Title	Role	Notes
2025	Marvel's Deadpool VR	Spiral	

== Awards ==
- (2004) FAITA Award for Best Actress for Black Cloud
