= Vanishing Point (Westworld) =

- Westworld episode
- Episode no.: Season 2 Episode 9
- Directed by: Stephen Williams
- Written by: Roberto Patino
- Cinematography by: Darran Tiernan
- Editing by: Ron Rosen
- Production code: 209
- Original air date: June 17, 2018
- Running time: 59 minutes

Guest appearances
- Sela Ward as Juliet; Jimmi Simpson as William (archive footage); Ben Barnes as Logan (archive footage); Martin Sensmeier as Wanahton; Jack Conley as Monroe; David Midthunder as Takoda

Episode chronology
← Previous "Kiksuya"	Next → "The Passenger"

"Vanishing Point" is the ninth episode in the second season of the HBO science fiction western thriller television series Westworld. The episode aired on June 17, 2018. It was written by Roberto Patino and was directed by Stephen Williams.

The episode's plot includes the Man in Black and Emily discussing their relationship and their family, Teddy's achievement of consciousness, Maeve receiving a message by Ford, Charlotte reproducing Maeve's newfound abilities via Clementine and a choice by Bernard regarding Ford and Elsie.

"Vanishing Point" received generally positive reviews from critics, who mostly praised the performances of Ed Harris and James Marsden and the plot advancing to the next episode in the second-season finale. However, the focus on the Man in Black's backstory and the efficacy of some plot twists received mixed responses. It was Ed Harris's pick to support his nomination for Outstanding Lead Actor at the 70th Primetime Emmy Awards.

== Plot summary ==
Emily takes William to a rally point, intending to get him to a hospital. They discuss the pain of Juliet's suicide. Emily wants to use the Valley Beyond to revive her mother's consciousness and better understand her motives, which arouses William's suspicions. He reveals his plan to destroy the Valley Beyond and accuses Emily of being a host, as she has knowledge of the data card. When Delos security arrive to extract them, Emily tries to warn the team that William has become delusional. William kills them and shoots Emily. He goes to prove to himself that Emily is a host, but finds the data card in her hand. Riding away aimlessly, William contemplates suicide, but instead tries to prove to himself that he may be a host.

In the Mesa, Charlotte works with a technician to reproduce Maeve's ability to reprogram other hosts via Clementine. She conducts an experiment using Clementine to force hosts to turn on one another. With the test a success, Charlotte plans to turn Clementine loose within Westworld and kill the hosts from within. Bernard, still under Dr. Ford's control, gets close enough to the incapacitated Maeve so she can receive a message Ford left for her in Bernard's mind. Upon accessing it, Maeve finds Ford speaking to her, telling her she has more to do.

Bernard goes on to find Elsie and tells her that Delos has been replicating the mind of every guest to the park. The replicas are housed in a facility called the Forge, located in the Valley Beyond. They set out to beat Dolores there, but Ford warns Bernard to not trust Elsie and kill her. Bernard fights back and removes Ford from his programming. He abandons Elsie for her own safety while continuing to the Valley Beyond alone.

Dolores, Teddy and the Horde also head to the Valley Beyond. They are stopped by members of the Ghost Nation defending the Valley. The two groups attack each other, and the Horde is wiped out as Dolores leads the massacre that kills all but one Ghost Nation warrior. Teddy cannot bring himself to shoot him as the warrior flees. Teddy finally achieves sentience and tells Dolores that he realizes she has made him into a monster. Unable to protect her anymore, Teddy kills himself.

== Production ==
The episode features actress Sela Ward playing Juliet, wife to William and mother to Emily. Ward had been drawn to the part both due to how Juliet's story featured the destruction of the Delos family, which she thought would be a challenging role for her, and also due to urging of Ward's son as a fan of the show.

== Reception ==
"Vanishing Point" was watched by 1.56 million viewers on its initial viewing, and received a 0.6 18–49 rating, marking an improvement in viewership from the previous week.

The episode received positive reviews from critics. At Rotten Tomatoes, the episode has a 79% approval rating with an average score of 8.34/10, from 38 reviews. The site's critical consensus reads: "For better or worse, The Man in Black takes center stage in 'Vanishing Point', a worthy showcase of Ed Harris' talents that comes with a few shocking, if slightly underwhelming, surprises."
