= Tales of the City (disambiguation) =

Tales of the City is a series of novels by Armistead Maupin.

== Related to the Maupin novels ==
- Tales of the City (novel), 1978 novel, first in the series
  - Tales of the City (1993 miniseries), 1993 television adaptation
- More Tales of the City (novel), 1980 novel
  - More Tales of the City (miniseries), 1998 television adaptation
- Further Tales of the City (novel), 1982 novel
  - Further Tales of the City (miniseries), 2001 television adaptation
- Tales of the City (2019 miniseries), a revival series for Netflix, based on later novels in Maupin's series
- Armistead Maupin's Tales of the City, a 2011 musical with music by Jake Shears

== Other ==
- Tales of the City (album), a 1988 album by Rockmelons
- Tales of the City (Obverse Books), a 2012 City of the Saved anthology
