= Swig =

Swig may refer to:

== People ==
- Benjamin Swig (1893–1980), American real estate developer and philanthropist, son of Simon
- Melvin Swig (1917–1993), American real estate developer and philanthropist, son of Benjamin
- Simon Swig (1862–1939) American banker, politician and philanthropist

== Other uses ==
- to drink
- Swig (restaurant), a Utah-based beverage chain
- SWIG (Simplified Wrapper and Interface Generator), an open source software tool
- Swig Program in Jewish Studies and Social Justice program at the University of San Francisco

== See also ==
- Swiggy, an Indian food delivery app
