= Mona of the Manor =

2024 novel by Armistead Maupin

- US first edition cover
- Author: Armistead Maupin
- Audio read by: Mara Wilson
- Language: English
- Series: Tales of the City
- Genre: Novel
- Published: March 5, 2024
- Publisher: HarperCollins
- Publication place: United States
- Media type: Print (Hardcover)
- Pages: 235
- ISBN: 978-0-06-297359-7
- Preceded by: The Days of Anna Madrigal

Mona of the Manor (2024) is the tenth book in the Tales of the City series by American novelist Armistead Maupin. It was billed as the final book in the series and is Maupin's first book to focus on the experience of queer life in the 1990s. It was also the first book written by Maupin after his emigration to the United Kingdom.

Themes that come up in this book include the AIDS epidemic, the rights of transgender people, and domestic violence.

== Plot summary ==
Chronologically, this book fits between the sixth (Sure of You) and seventh (Michael Tolliver Lives) books of the series, focusing its attention on Mona Ramsey, who (thanks to a green-card marriage to a closeted English lord who wanted to live his best life in San Francisco), is now the "Lady of the Manor", continuing to live her unconventional life in the Cotswolds of England with her adopted son Wilfred, who together keep the manor house afloat by providing lodging to US American tourists seeking an experience of "old England". Drama comes to the manor house with the arrival of a couple from the American South who have a terrible secret.

== Adaptations ==
The audio edition of the book was narrated by Mara Wilson.
