= Curt Dawson =

American actor

- Born: December 5, 1939; Russell, Kansas, U.S.
- Died: January 13, 1985 (aged 45); New York City, U.S.
- Education: Emporia State University; Royal Academy of Dramatic Art

Curt Dawson (December 5, 1939 – January 13, 1985) was an American stage and television actor.

== Early life ==
Curt Dawson was born December 5, 1939, in Russell, Kansas. He graduated from Emporia State University in 1960, and attended the Royal Academy of Dramatic Art in London, U.K.

== Career ==
Dawson became a stage actor on Broadway. He played in Sleuth in 1973 and Absurd Person Singular in 1975. He also played in The Boys in the Band, as well as in Alice in Wonderland and The Royal Family alongside Eva Le Gallienne.

On television, Dawson acted in As the World Turns, Guiding Light, Another World, Search for Tomorrow, and The Adams Chronicles.

== Personal life and death ==
Dawson was gay; he had relationships with author Armistead Maupin and actor Ian McKellen. He resided in SoHo, Manhattan, New York City.

Dawson died on January 13, 1985, at the Bellevue Hospital in New York City. Even though his obituary in The New York Times said he died of "complications resulting from cancer", Maupin says in his memoir, Logical Family, that he died of AIDS.
