= The Summit (San Francisco) =

High-rise condominium building

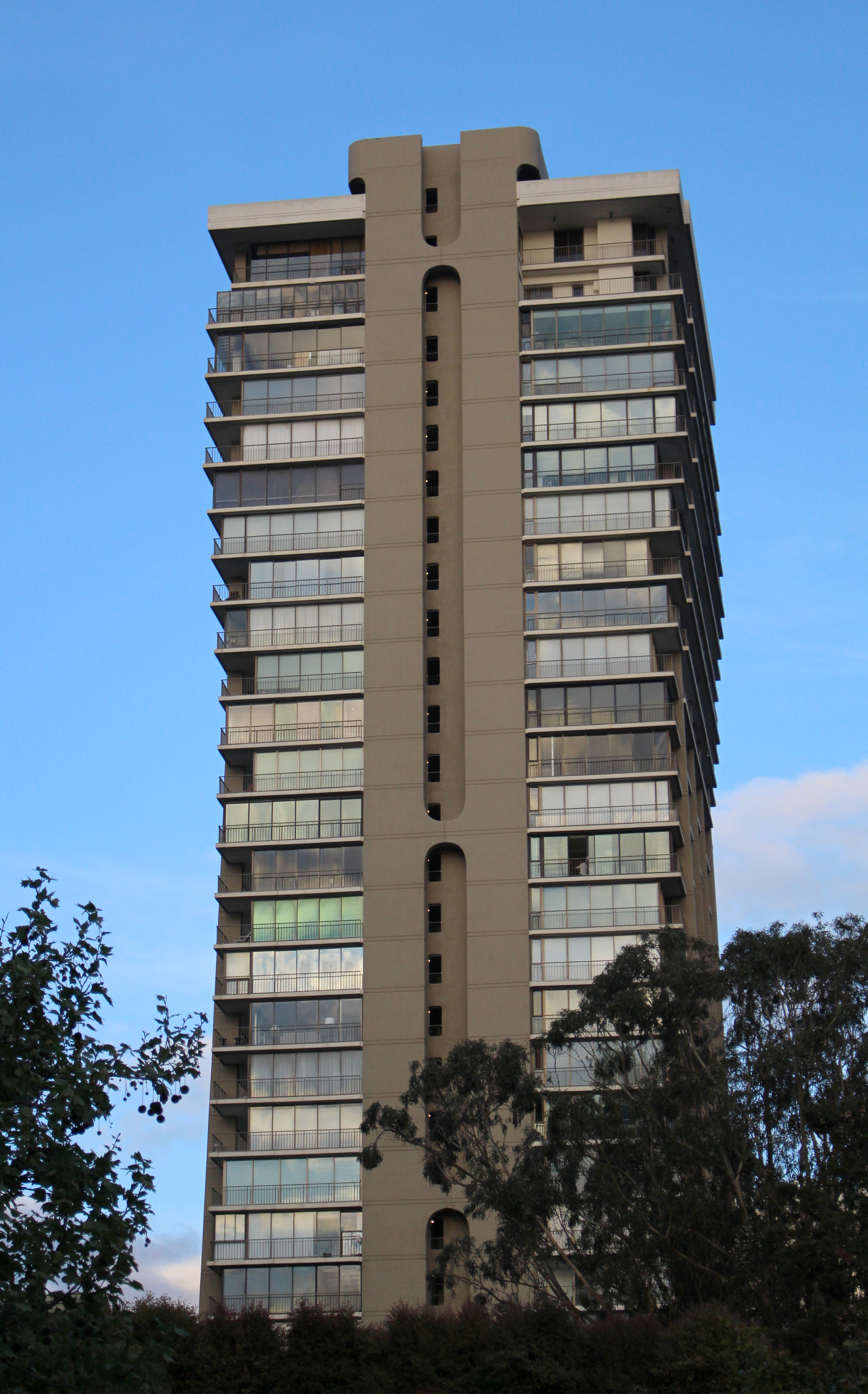

- Location within San Francisco The Summit (San Francisco) (California) The Summit (San Francisco) (the United States)
- Alternative names: The Eichler Summit

General information
- Status: Completed
- Type: Residential condominiums
- Location: 999 Green Street; San Francisco, California
- Coordinates: 37.7984°N 122.4151°W
- Opening: 1965

Height
- Roof: 96 m (315 ft)

Technical details
- Floor count: 32

Design and construction
- Architects: Claude Oakland & Associates; Neill Smith & Associates
- Developer: Joseph Eichler

The Summit is a highrise condominium tower developed by Joseph Eichler, located near the top of the upscale Russian Hill in San Francisco, California, at 999 Green Street.

The tower was designed by architect Tibor Fecskes of Neill Smith and Associates. Above ground, it has 4 floors of parking and 25 floors of residential condominiums. The tower was completed in 1965. This residential tower is featured in Sean Wilsey's book Oh the Glory of It All as well as Significant Others and Sure of You by Armistead Maupin.

Residents have included former Secretary of State George Shultz and his wife, San Francisco's chief of protocol, Charlotte Smith Mailliard Swig Shultz.

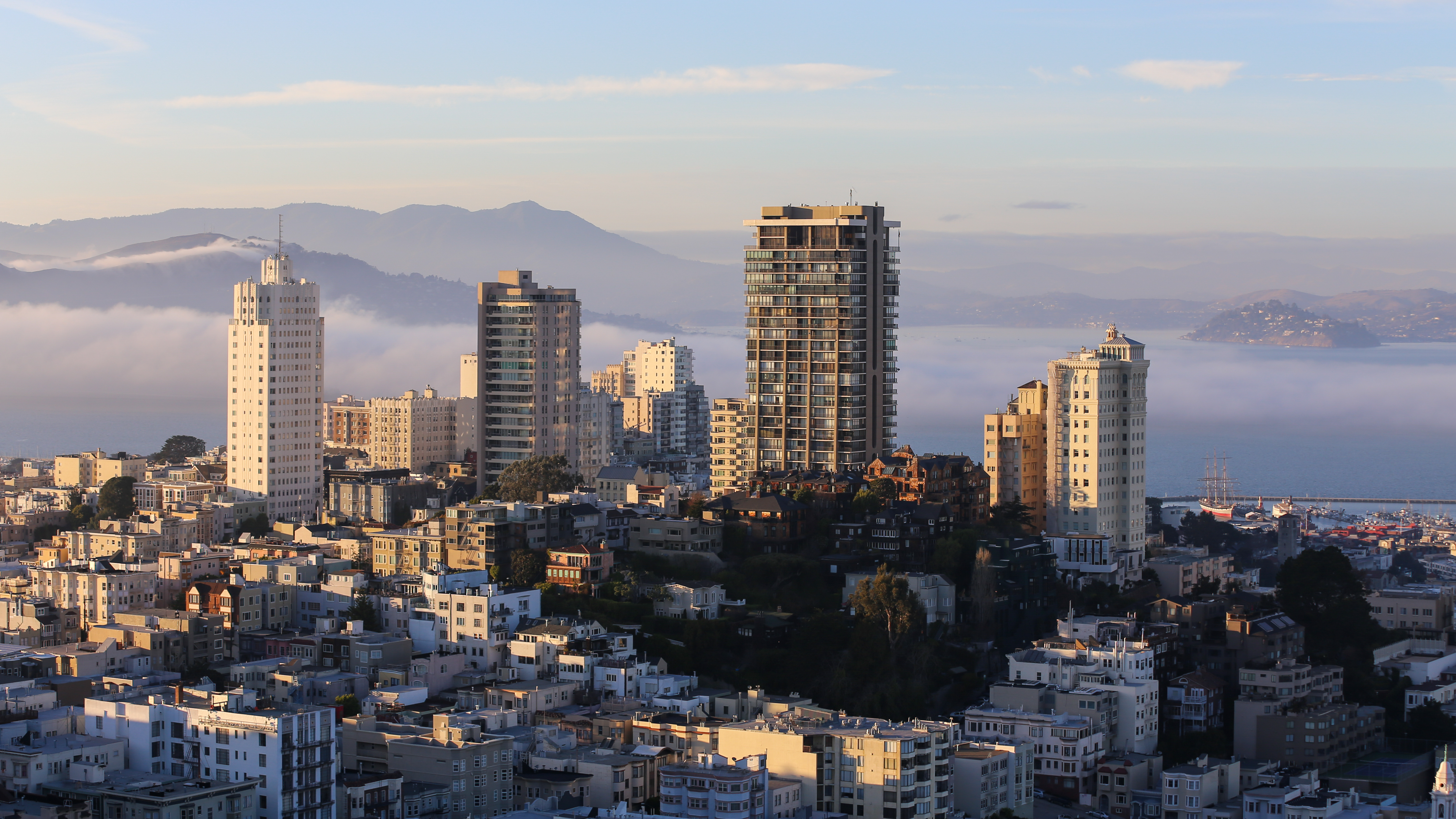
View on Russian Hill from the Southeast. The Summit is visible as the highest building, in the center.

== See also ==
- List of tallest buildings in San Francisco
