= Charlotte Schultz =

Charlotte Schultz may refer to:

- Charlotte Mailliard Shultz (born 1933), American heiress and socialite
- Charlotte Schultz (actress) (1899–1946), German stage and film actress
