= Significant Other =

A significant other is a partner in an intimate relationship.

Significant Other or Significant Others may also refer to:

== Film and television ==
- Significant Other (film), a 2022 American sci-fi horror film
- Significant Other (TV series), a 2023 British comedy drama series on ITV
- Significant Others (1998 TV series), an American drama series on the Fox Network
- Significant Others (2004 TV series), an American sitcom on Bravo
- Significant Others (2022 TV series), an Australian TV series

=== Episodes ===
- "significANT other", an episode from season 2 of A.N.T. Farm
- "Significant Other", an episode from season 1 of People of Earth
- "Significant Others", an episode from season 5 of Castle
- "Significant Others", an episode from season 1 of Hearts Afire
- "Significant Others", an episode from season 3 of Party of Five
- "Significant Others", an episode from season 1 of QB1: Beyond the Lights
- "Significant Others", an episode from season 3 of Roswell
- "Significant Others", an episode from the web series The Outs
- "Significant Others", an episode from season 2 of The Smoking Room

== Other uses ==
- Significant Other (album), a 1999 album by Limp Bizkit
- Significant Other (play), a 2015 stage play
- Significant Others (novel), a 1987 work by Armistead Maupin

== See also ==
- or
