= Swiggers =

Swiggers may refer to:

- Francine Swiggers, a Belgian businesswoman
- Ronny Swiggers (born 1961), Belgian successful quiz player

== See also ==
- Swig (disambiguation)
- Swigger, a person who drinks a lot of the specified liquid, usually alcohol. Refer to Alcohol intoxication
