= Jack D. Weiler =

American business Person

- Born: 1904; Svitskoy, Russian Empire
- Died: 1995 (age 91); New Rochelle, New York
- Occupation: real estate developer
- Known for: Co-founder of Swig, Arnow, & Weiler
- Spouse: Doris Person
- Children: Alan Weiler; Joan Weiler Arnow

Jack D. Weiler (1904–1995) was an American real estate developer and philanthropist.

== Biography ==
Weiler was born to a poor Jewish family in Svyatsk, Russian Empire, the seventh of ten children. His father, Faivel, was a rabbi and Talmudic scholar. In 1910, the family moved to the United States and settled in Manhattan and then the Bronx where his father taught yeshiva students. During high school, Weiler worked odd jobs and was forced to leave college due to lack of funds and accept a job as a stenographer in a real estate office. He eventually became a broker where he learned all aspects of the real estate business and in 1936, he partnered with Benjamin Swig (father of Melvin Swig) of Boston and founded a real estate company then named Swig & Weiler. Weiler managed the firm's New York office while Swig ran the West Coast business out of San Francisco. They grew the business nationally including over 5 million square feet in New York City and 1.5 million square feet in California; properties owned included the Metropolitan Opera House (which they demolished to build 1411 Broadway at 39th Street); the W. R. Grace Building; 1065 Avenue of the Americas; and 711 Third Avenue at 44th Street.

== Philanthropy ==
Weiler is also known for his charitable activities stating "Philanthropy comes first, ahead of my business". In 1964, he received the Israel Bond Organization's first Herbert H. Lehman Israel Award. Weiler was a leader in the United Jewish Appeal, Israel Bonds and the American Joint Distribution Committee. He served as the chairman of the board of overseers for the Albert Einstein College of Medicine of Yeshiva University, and in 1985, Einstein Hospital in the Bronx was renamed the Jack D. Weiler Hospital.

In 1995, a new community of 5,000 residents just south of Jerusalem was renamed Kiryat Jack Weiler in his honor. He served as chairman of the Housing Committee of the Jewish Agency for Israel which brought 50,000 diaspora Jews to Israel. The architecture school of the Bezalel Academy of Arts and Design in Jerusalem was renamed the Jack D. Weiler College of Architecture; he funded the Weiler-Arnow Medical Education Building at Ben Gurion University of the Negev; and the Jerusalem College of Technology named its yeshiva in honor of his father.

Weiler served as the national treasurer and president of the Century Club of the State of Israel Bonds Organization; former president and chairman of the board of directors of Bronx-Lebanon Hospital; a member of the board of the Montefiore Medical Center; a member of the board of the Jewish Theological Seminary of America; president of the Realty Foundation of Greater New York; and president of the UJA-Federation of New York. Weiler stated "I tell them that you can't take it with you, that once you're stretched out in a box, your hands are always open, not closed."

In 1947, he was named an honorary alumnus of Brandeis University, he was the first New Yorker and the third individual in the United States to receive this honor.

== Personal life ==
In 1927, he married Doris Person; they had two children: Alan Weiler and Joan Weiler Arnow who was married to real estate developer Robert H. Arnow.
