= Andrew R. Heinze =

American dramatist (born 1955)

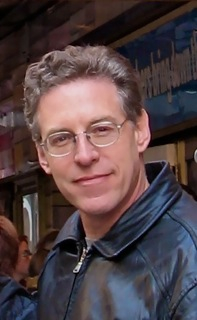
- Born: Andrew R. Heinze; 1 January 1955 (age 71); Passaic, New Jersey
- Education: Blair Academy, Amherst College, University of California, Berkeley
- Occupations: Playwright, non-fiction author, scholar of American history
- Website: www.andrewheinze.com

Andrew R. Heinze (born 1955) is an American playwright, non-fiction author, and scholar of American history. Growing up in New Jersey in a close-knit Jewish family, he left home at fourteen to attend Blair Academy, graduated from Amherst College in Massachusetts, and moved to California. He did his graduate work at the University of California, Berkeley, training in American history, with an emphasis on the history of race, immigration and the history of American Jews. During his academic career he taught both American and Jewish history at several American universities and was a tenured professor of history at the University of San Francisco, where he was director of the Swig Judaic Studies Program, holding the Mae and Benjamin Swig Chair and creating several new programs including an Ulpan and a Judaic studies lecture series.

He has written extensively about the American Jewish social, intellectual and cultural experience, and is the author of Adapting to Abundance (1990), the first full-length study of the impact of American consumer culture on an immigrant group, as well as Jews and the American Soul (2004), which hypothesizes that Jewish intellectuals provided a framework that came to shape the American psyche. He co-authored two books that deal with race and ethnicity, and he has contributed to a wide variety of scholarly journals as well as to popular newspapers, periodicals and online publications. His books and articles have been widely reviewed, praised in the scholarly community, and cited extensively.

In 2006, feeling creatively stifled by the confines of academic writing, he left his tenured full professorship at USF and moved to New York City to begin playwriting. He has written one-act as well as full-length plays, many of them focusing on the historical and Jewish themes that had absorbed him in his former career; these include a comedy about Moses and his family, a drama about a New York Jewish family adjusting to life after World War II, and a drama about an Israeli Russian immigrant who, in desperation, has turned to prostitution. His plays have been produced Off-Broadway in New York City and around the United States; several have won awards in national playwriting competitions.

== Early life and education ==
Andrew R. Heinze was born in 1955, into a close-knit Jewish family in Passaic, New Jersey. His paternal grandmother (also born in Passaic) was one of eight children born to a self-made Polish Jew who had supplied coal to the city of Passaic. Heinze memorialized his grandmother in an article he wrote for The Jewish Daily Forward shortly after she died at the age of 101; he described her as a flamboyant, stylish, and impeccably dressed woman, and he recalled that after his grandfather (her husband of 60 years) had died, she "kept on going, honestly confessing her loneliness but unflaggingly maintaining her enthusiasm for life and for us." He quoted her as frequently giving him the reminder, "We are 100% Americans, dear, always remember that!" Heinze has a close relationship with his parents; in his acknowledgements of his second book, he wrote, "I have been blessed with extraordinarily devoted parents who enabled me, as a child, to feel at home in the world." His mother, he said, is a woman of "gentle disposition, sensitivity to human qualities that others overlook, vivacious imagination, love of art, and whimsical sense of humor," and his father he described as a man of "great loyalty, heartfelt devotion, and frequent praise [that] helped me set my sights high and pick myself up when fallen low."

At age fourteen Heinze won a scholarship to Blair Academy, a private boarding school in Warren County, New Jersey. His experience at Blair was formative. It was there that he first discovered a fascination with both writing and history. In a 2005 interview, he recalled that he had relished the mental stimulation his Blair teachers had given him, that they took his intellectual growth very seriously, and that he still recalled distinct lectures from many of his classes. He honed his writing skills working for Blair's school newspaper; he started as a reporter doing local news and human interest stories and ended up as the paper's editor-in-chief. Graduating from Blair in 1973, he won a Bodman Foundation scholarship which enabled him to attend Amherst College, where he received his BA in 1977, graduating magna cum laude. After graduating from Amherst, he left the East Coast, moved to California, and attended graduate school at the University of California, Berkeley where he received his MA (1980) and his PhD (1987) in American history.

== Academic career ==
Heinze's first professorship was at San Jose State University, where he taught United States History and won San Jose State University's Meritorious Performance and Professional Promise Award for 1988–1989. He later taught United States History at the University of California, Davis and the University of California, Berkeley before becoming a tenured full professor at the University of San Francisco, where he taught American history from 1994 to 2006. He won the University of San Francisco's Ignatian Faculty Service Award in 2003.

Heinze specialized in the history of race and immigration in the United States, the evolution of American consumer culture, and the interaction between psychology and religion in American history. He researched and taught extensively on both African-Americans and Jews in the United States, and he maintained strong interests in relations between Christianity and Judaism, religion and homosexuality, racism and antisemitism.

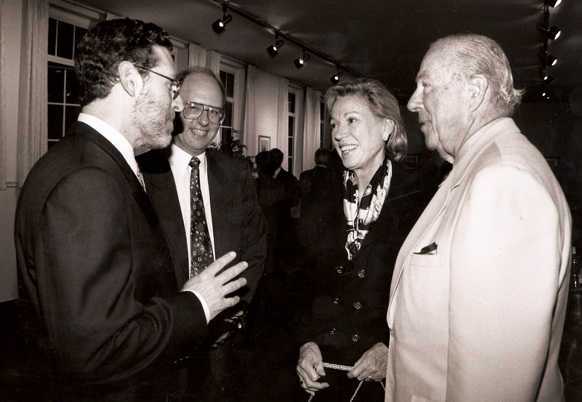
Heinze with Stanley Nel, Charlotte Shultz, and former Secretary of State, George Shultz at the Swig 20th Anniversary Celebration, 1997

In 1997 Heinze, who was faculty adviser to USF's Jewish Student Union, was appointed to be the Mae and Benjamin Swig Chair in the Swig Judaic Studies Program and to direct the program. The Swig program was established in 1977 and is believed to have been the first such program established in a Catholic university. Heinze's first act as director was to invite Jan Karski, a man he had long admired, to speak at the program's upcoming 20th anniversary dinner. Karski, renowned for his active role in the Polish resistance movement in World War II, delivered the keynote address before an audience that included former secretary of state, George Shultz.

To solidify the Swig Program's academic standing, Heinze created a Jewish Studies Certificate program and expanded the curriculum beyond the theology department by introducing courses in Hebrew, Jewish history, The Holocaust, Jewish American literature, and Yiddish culture. Free public lectures and programs were made available to the general public, and in 1998 he created Ulpan San Francisco, an intense Israeli-style Hebrew immersion program that was scheduled during the summer and served anyone living in the San Francisco Bay area; it was the first such program to be offered there and is still a part of that community.

In 1998 Heinze inaugurated The Swig Annual Lecture Series (1998–2005) which brought distinguished scholars to the university; the lectures were presented free to the general public and were published and distributed to universities, public libraries, and individual scholars in the United States and abroad. Heinze hand-picked the topics as well as the participating lecturers, bringing public attention to a range of often controversial subjects that were of special interest to him. Two of the lectures garnered particularly strong public interest: one dealt with relations between Catholicism and Judaism (the speakers were Cardinal Edward Cassidy, president of the Pontifical Commission for Religious Relations with the Jews, and renowned British rabbi, Rabbi Norman Solomon). The other lecture focused on homosexuality. Heinze had wanted to discover if there was a way "gay and lesbian Jews and Christians [might] find a more comfortable place within their faith-communities." (He had wanted to include Muslim speakers but was unable to find anyone.) The lecture was presented in the form of a symposium and was entitled "New Jewish and Christian Approaches to Homosexuality." Even in the liberal community of San Francisco, it sparked heated debate because established religion did not normally deal explicitly with the issue.

== Non-fiction writing ==
=== Scholarly writings ===
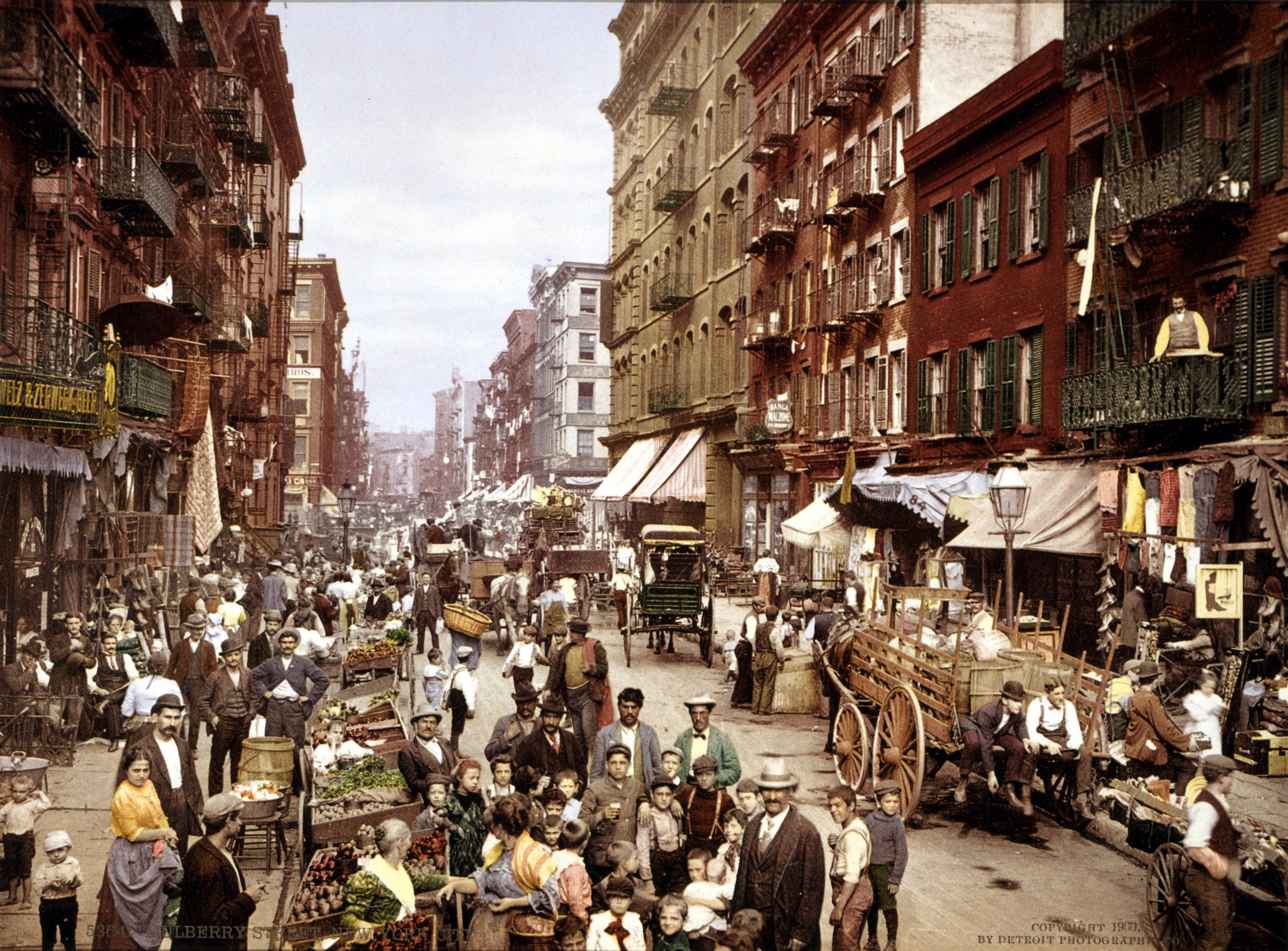
Downtown shopping in New York City, c. 1900

Heinze's first book, Adapting to Abundance: Jewish Immigrants, Mass Consumption, and the Search for American Identity, was published in 1990. It was the first full-length study of the impact of American consumer culture on an immigrant group. Hasia Diner, professor of history at New York University, said about Heinze: "Historians of immigration and Jewish history will be indebted to him for opening up whole areas of behavior which they previously shrugged off as irrelevant." The Journal of Consumer Affairs remarked upon the variety of topics that the book explored: the rise of ad campaigns for major American products in the foreign-language press; the rise of the summer vacation among working people; installment-buying as a way for working families to obtain expensive furnishings such as pianos; the role of Jewish women as agents of assimilation through their control over family purchases; and the way that American abundance altered religious rituals, especially holidays such as Chanukah and Passover. Adapting to Abundance established Heinze's reputation as part of a scholarly vanguard that produced the first histories of mass consumption in Europe and America. It is widely referenced in books, articles and syllabi around the world.

In 2004 Heinze published Jews and the American Soul: Human Nature in the Twentieth Century. David Hollinger, professor of history at the University of California, Berkeley said, "Jews and the American Soul is the most forthright, probing, nuanced, and carefully documented book yet addressed to the ways in which modern American culture has been influenced by Jews. A truly distinctive work of American history." Jon Butler, professor of American studies, history, and religious studies at Yale University, said about the book, "Heinze explains how Jewish intellectuals uncovered and explicated the marrow of American identity even as, or precisely because, they sought to secure their place in an America that did not always want them. Heinze uplifts an unexpected, enlightening story with insight, grace, and not infrequent irony--a simply fascinating read." It was named one of the "Best Books of 2004" by Publishers Weekly, was runner up in the 2005 National Jewish Book Award in the American Jewish History category, and was a Finalist for the 2004 Weinberg Judaic Studies Institute Book Award, University of Scranton.

Heinze was one of nine authors who contributed to The Columbia Documentary History of Race and Ethnicity in America (Columbia University Press), and to the abridged Race and Ethnicity in America: A Concise History. The Columbia Documentary History was praised as a "massive collection of primary-source documents dealing with 'the other' in America... [including]... an extensive introductory essay by a leading historian in the field."

His scholarly articles have appeared in a wide variety of journals, including Journal of American History, Judaism. American Quarterly, Religion and American Culture, American Jewish History, Journal of the West, American Jewish Archives, and Reviews in American History.

=== Opinion pieces and essays ===
Heinze's essays and opinion pieces have been widely published in newspapers, journals, periodicals and online publications. His opinion pieces are occasionally political, sometimes historical, but most focus on timely issues involving race, immigration or religion. His essays, in contrast, are often cultural critiques of popular books, television shows or movies. Sometimes his essays explore his own family or his personal life; sometimes they are serious, but often they are light-hearted or comic.

==== Opinion pieces ====
Heinze's opinion pieces rarely focus on politics, but in 2002 on the History News Network, he faulted George W. Bush for giving "a businessman's response" to questions about corporate greed. He suggested that Theodore Roosevelt (one of his favorite historical figures) would have spoken differently. "Theodore Roosevelt," Heinze said, "never thought or spoke like a businessman. On the contrary," he pointed out, "he placed military men, statesmen and even scholars – but not businessmen – at the top of his hierarchy of values... Selfishness, especially materialistic selfishness, offended him as a profound moral dereliction."

Heinze has often written about antisemitism, but his concerns have usually focused on countries other than the United States. "One of the reasons Jews have traditionally viewed America as a promised land is the comparative absence of violence against them," he said. In 1999, however, Buford Furrow and the Los Angeles Jewish Community Center shooting got his attention, and he wrote an opinion piece about it for the San Francisco Examiner. "Standing at the end of the decade, the century and the millennium," he wrote, "I think we must agree with Buford Furrow about one thing. The attack on a Jewish day care center in Los Angeles is a wake-up call."

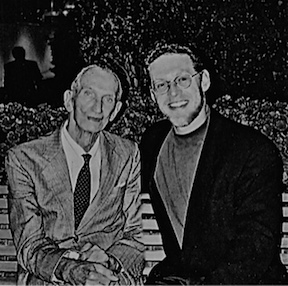
Heinze with Jan Karski, Opera Plaza in San Francisco, 1997

Heinze has written a number of opinion pieces that have focused on the relations between Catholics and Jews. It was logical that he would be interested in the subject because he was a Jew who worked in a Catholic university, he was faculty advisor for the school's Jewish Student Union, and he was director of the school's Jewish Studies program. There was another, more personal, reason for his interest, however; in 1997 he had met Jan Karski, the courageous Polish Catholic who was recognized in 1982 as Righteous Among the Nations for his efforts to help the Jews in World War II. (Karski had said in 1981, "just as my wife’s entire family was wiped out in the ghettos of Poland, in its concentration camps and crematoria — so have all the Jews who were slaughtered become my family. But I am a Christian Jew... I am a practicing Catholic... My faith tells me the second original sin has been committed by humanity. This sin will haunt humanity to the end of time. And I want it to be so.") After Karski delivered the keynote address at the first Swig function Heinze had presided over, he had spent some personal time with Heinze and his family; Heinze never forgot Karski's gentle warmth, his integrity and his courage.

In 1998 Heinze wrote an opinion piece for the Examiner, "The Vatican Repents Catholic Anti-Semitism;" it focused on the long-awaited and newly released document, We Remember: A Reflection on the Shoah, published by Cardinal Edward Cassidy, president of the Pontifical Commission for Religious Relations with the Jews. The document had caused heated controversy; many critics argued that it didn't go far enough in taking responsibility for the past. Heinze's Examiner article opened with the story of Bernard Lichtenberg, a Catholic priest who was arrested in 1941 by the Berlin Gestapo because he had publicly prayed for the Jews; after his arrest, Lichtenberg asked to be sent away with the Jews so that he could pray for their welfare. He spent the next two years in a Nazi prison camp and died on his way to Dachau. After telling the story of Father Lichtenberg, Heinze gave his opinion of the We Remember document. He agreed with the critics that "The Catholic Church must reckon with historical fact, proving its awareness of sin in high places." "But," he added, "the rest of us must encourage the message of repentance and renewal the church is preaching to its followers because, in the end, that is what produces people such as Bernard Lichtenberg." It was an opinion piece that encouraged reconciliation, not anger. Two years later Heinze invited Cardinal Cassidy to San Francisco to participate in a Swig lecture on interfaith understanding. Cardinal Cassidy accepted the invitation.

==== Essays ====
In his Jewish Daily Forward essay, "Breaking the Mold of the Sitcom," Heinze analyzes his favorite TV comedy, Seinfeld, casting an affectionate eye on the show's creators, Jerry Seinfeld and Larry David, and marveling at their success in probing "the many gestures, innuendoes and gaps in the messages we send each other every day in every type of situation. Those, they know, contain the real meanings that pass back and forth beneath the surface of our conventions. Those are the explosives littering the minefield that is life in society." Heinze is stunned that the show is able to pack so much original comedy into twenty-two minutes of airtime, and he has little sympathy for people who dismiss the show as being shallow or neurotically self-focused: "People with little sense of humor have failed, time and again, to understand that the notorious self-centeredness of the show’s characters enables us to laugh at the selfish, neurotic traits we all share but prefer to disguise."

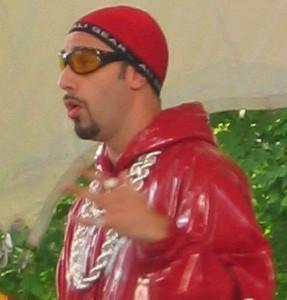
Ali g in his full "wannabe-gangsta" rap regalia

In another Jewish Daily Forward essay, "Life Among the Goyim," Heinze looks at the British comedian, Sacha Baron Cohen, and his TV comedy, Da Ali G Show, whose title character is a parody of a "white wannabe-gangsta rapper who not only adopts all the appropriate clothes, gestures and locutions but also convinces himself that he is black." In his essay, Heinze points out that Baron Cohen is a Jew who speaks Hebrew and keeps kosher; and his undergraduate history thesis at Cambridge University was on black-Jewish relations. Yet, Heinze wonders, is there anything about his comedy that is specifically Jewish? For Heinze, the answer is yes, and he arrives at the "yes" in the following whimsical way: "If we take 'goyim' loosely to mean people who are strange, often affable, and potentially dangerous, then, yes, 'Da Ali G Show' is Jewish comedy and we, in our digital phantasmagoria of a world, are all goyim, all on camera, all the time."

"A Lost Chapter From the Life of Oz" (also in The Jewish Daily Forward) explores Amos Oz's 2005 memoir, A Tale of Love and Darkness. Heinze (who speaks Hebrew) noticed that the English translation was missing a chapter (chapter five). His essay is built on that discovery, and it seems the missing chapter was extracted (presumably by the editors) because it was a rant against "bad readers." It was thought, apparently, that chapter five would interrupt the flow of the book, or otherwise "put-off" the English-speaking audience. As to the actual information in chapter five: Oz believes that "bad readers" are intrusive; they are inquisitive about the author's life; they ask very personal questions; they pry; they make his life hell; they behave like the people on TMZ. Oz equates "the bad reader" with "a psychopathic lover." Heinze was fascinated by the missing chapter and by Oz's assessment of things, and he approached the memoir (and its missing chapter) from an interesting slant, comparing it to the memoir Hunger of Memory by Richard Rodriguez, whose editors also tried (unsuccessfully) to get him to take out certain controversial passages from his book.

== Theatrical career ==
In a 2005 interview, Heinze spoke of the creative frustration that led him to leave academia. "Even though I was doing a lot of academic writing," he said, "I had this ceaseless, nagging feeling that I wasn't fulfilling myself creatively... I finally took the plunge into a real fiction project... [and] it became clear to me that creative rather than scholarly writing was my real métier." He chose playwriting, in particular, because of Joe Orton; the intensity, intelligence and dark humor of Orton's plays had fascinated him. In 2006 he left his tenured full professorship at USF, moved to New York City, and embarked on a career in playwriting.

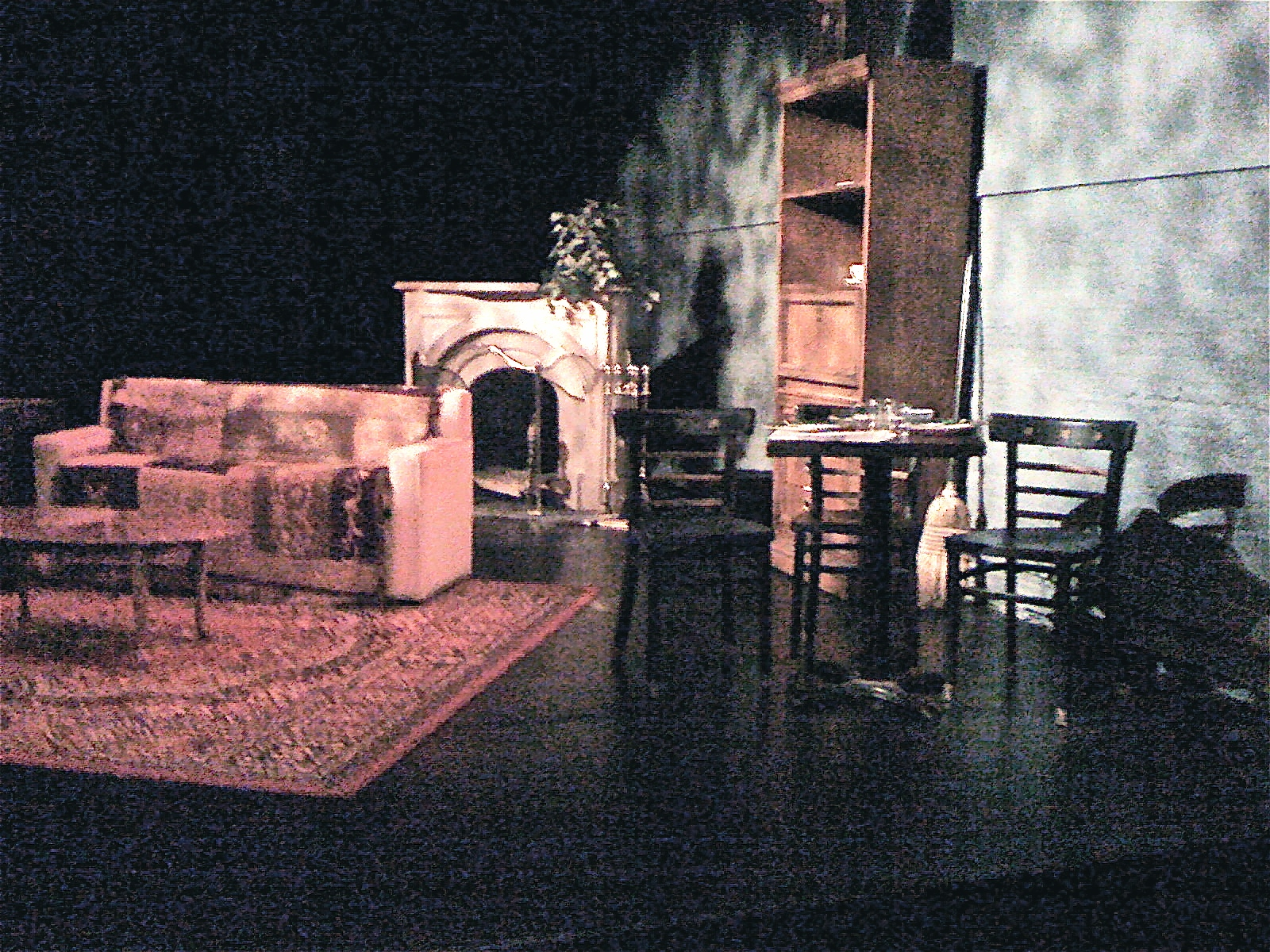
The set of The Invention of the Living Room, HB Studio, New York City (2009)

His first full-length play, Turtles All the Way Down, although unproduced, was praised by the Soho Theatre in London as "an accomplished first effort...sharp and highly enjoyable... very theatrical: fast moving with lots of humour." His next play, The Invention of the Living Room, started as a one-act play; it was produced in 2009 by HB Studio in Manhattan's West Village, and it had a second production at the Metropolitan Playhouse in the East Village. The play focused on a Lower East Side Jewish family, struggling in the aftermath of World War II. Heinze expanded it into a full-length version that won a place in the Harriet Lake Festival of New Plays at the Orlando Shakespeare Theater in 2011. In 2012 it was a Finalist for the Blue Ink Playwriting Award given by the American Blues Theater in Chicago, and in 2014 it won the Texas NonProfit Theatres' New Play Project, with a World Premiere at the Tyler Civic Theatre.

He wrote Hamilton, a tragedy about Alexander Hamilton, in 2012; it was a semi-finalist for the 2012 National Playwrights Conference at the Eugene O'Neill Theatre and a Finalist for the T. Schreiber Studio’s 2012 New Works Festival. His dark comedy Please Lock Me Away was a Finalist at the Kitchen Dog Theater (Dallas) 2014 New Play competition. Moses, The Author, a comedy about the biblical Moses, "shows the 120-year-old lawgiver on his last day on earth as he races to finish the Torah" Heinze said the play "is a 'midrash' that imagines how Moses might have dealt with the series of crushing setbacks that faced him, from having a speech defect to being told that could not enter the Promised Land." Moses, The Author had a World Premiere at the New York International Fringe Festival in 2014, won a place in the Harriet Lake Festival of New Plays at the Orlando Shakespeare Theater (2014), and had an extended run at the SoHo Playhouse in Manhattan.

Heinze has written a number of one-act plays and believes the short-play format can teach a writer "the basics of dramatic structure." His short plays have been produced across the United States and have won numerous awards. In 2010 his one-act comedy, The FQ, won "Audience Favorite" at the New York City Fifteen-Minute Play Festival, and at the same festival, the following year, his short comedy, The Bar Mitzvah of Jesus Goldfarb, won "Judges' Choice" and "Audience Choice for Best Play." The FQ was published in The Best Ten-Minute Plays 2011, by Smith & Kraus. His one-act drama Masha: Conditions in the Holy Land won the Jury Prize for Best Script at the Fusion Theatre Company's 2012 Short Play Festival (Albuquerque, New Mexico), and in 2013 it was produced for the 38th Annual Samuel French Off-Off-Broadway Short Play Festival in New York City.

Asked by Samuel French, Inc. if he could name the playwright who had most influenced him, Heinze said, "If I were darker, it would be Orton. If I were more laconic, it would be Pinter. If I were more lyrically erudite, it would be Stoppard. If I had ten additional brains, it would be Shakespeare. Hm. Everyone seems to be English. If I were more Irish, it would be Beckett. (And if I had more savoir faire, it would be Molière.)" He added, "I think all my sources of inspiration are unconventional. It's the feeling of something unconventional that makes me want to write the play. At least for a full-length play that’s true. I think I wouldn't want to invest the time if I didn’t have that feeling."

== Selected works ==
=== Selected non-fiction Books ===
- Adapting to Abundance: Jewish Immigrants, Mass Consumption and the Search for American Identity (Columbia University Press, 1990) ISBN 9780231068536
- Jews and the American Soul: Human Nature in the Twentieth Century (Princeton University Press, 2004) ISBN 9780691117553

He is a co-author of the following books:

- Race and Ethnicity in America: A Concise History (Columbia University Press, 2003), ISBN 9780231129404
- The Columbia Documentary History of Race and Ethnicity in America (Columbia University Press, 2004), ISBN 9780231129411

=== Selected scholarly articles ===
His scholarly articles have appeared in a wide variety of scholarly journals including, Journal of American History, Judaism. American Quarterly, Religion and American Culture, American Jewish History, Journal of the West, American Jewish Archives, and Reviews in American history.

=== Selected essays and opinion pieces ===
His essays and opinion pieces have been widely published. His work has appeared in various newspapers, journals, periodicals and online publications, including Chronicle of Higher Education, The Wall Street Journal, The San Francisco Examiner, Taki's Magazine, History News Network, San Francisco Gate, and The Jewish Daily Forward.

=== Selected theatrical plays ===
- The Invention of the Living Room (2009)
- The FQ (2010)
- The Bar Mitzvah of Jesus Goldfarb (2011)
- Hamilton (2012)
- Masha: Conditions in the Holy Land (2012)
- Please Lock Me Away (2013)
- What It Takes to Get Things Done in Washington (2014)
- Moses, The Author (2014)

== The Swig Lectures 1998-2005 ==
1. Jewish-Catholic Relations in a Secular Age (1998) – David Novak, professor of religion and philosophy at the University of Toronto
2. The New Otherness: Marrano Dualities in the First Generation (1999) – Yirmiyahu Yovel, professor of philosophy at The New School
3. Inaugural Symposium of the Flannery-Hyatt Institute for Interfaith Understanding (2000) – Cardinal Edward Cassidy, president of the Pontifical Commission for Religious Relations with the Jews; Rabbi Norman Solomon, winner of the Sir Edmund Sternberg Award in Christian-Jewish Relations
4. Worshipping Together in Uniform: Christians and Jews in World War II (2001) – Deborah Dash Moore, professor of history at the University of Michigan
5. New Jewish and Christian Approaches to Homosexuality: A Symposium (2002) – Patricia Beattie Jung, professor of theology at Loyola University Chicago; Jeffrey Siker, professor of theology at Loyola Marymount University; Rabbi Elliot N. Dorff, professor in philosophy at American Jewish University; Bishop Frederick H. Borsch, Fifth Bishop of the Episcopal Diocese of Los Angeles; Rabbi Rebecca Alpert, professor of religion and women's studies at Temple University; Donal Godfrey, Society of Jesus, University Ministry at the University of San Francisco
6. The Popes and the Jews (2003) – Richard McBrien, professor of theology at the University of Notre Dame
7. Tax Policy as a Moral Issue Under Judeo-Christian Ethics (2004) – Susan Pace Hamill, professor of law at the University of Alabama
8. Is America’s Jesus Good for the Jews (2005)– Stephen Prothero, chairman of the department of religion and professor of religion at Boston University

== Notes and references ==
Footnotes

References

- "Adapting to Abundance" Heinze: search results. "Google "Book" search". www.google.com.
- Alpert, Rebecca T. (Fall 2005). "Jewish Roots of the American Soul" (PDF). The Reconstructionist. 70 (1). Wyncote, PA: 124–126.
- Altman-Ohr, Andy (15 September 2000). "A Jew Among the Jesuits Changes Mix at Santa Clara U." JWeelky. "Twenty years ago at a Jesuit school, you'd be taking a course in Old Testament taught by a Jesuit. And the course would inevitably approach the Hebrew Scriptures from a Christian perspective," said Professor Andy Heinze, who directs the University of San Francisco's Swig Judaic studies program. "The presence of even one person to do Jewish studies on a Catholic or Jesuit campus has a very big impact. It makes for a real shift in the curriculum."
- "Amherst College: Alumni: Andrew Heinze '77". Amherst College Alumni. Amherst, MA: Amherst College Alumni Association.
- "Andrew R. Heinze: USF CV/2006". USFCA.edu Faculty/Staff CV. University of San Francisco. Archived from the original on 24 September 2014.
- "Andrew R. Heinze: USF Homepage/2006". USFCA.edu Faculty/Staff Homepage. University of San Francisco. Archived from the original on 5 April 2005.
- "Becoming Jason Goldfarb". AmandaRamaNYC. 3 March 2011. Archived from the original on 19 December 2021 – via YouTube.
- Blair Bulletin (Spring 2005). "Andrew Heinze '73" (PDF). Blair Academy Bulletin 2005 (Spring 2005): 12.
- Brandt, Joshua (14 April 2000). "Rabbi, Cardinal Find Common Threads at New S.F. Forum". JWeekly. "Opening remarks were provided by Andrew Heinze, director of the Swig Judaic studies program at USF, and the university's president, the Rev. John Schlegel."
- Brandt, Joshua (21 April 2000). "Catholic-Jewish Dialogue in S.F. Again Turns to Pope". JWeekly.
- Brandt, Joshua (26 April 2002). "Anti-Gay Prohibitions Obsolete, 2 Rabbis Proclaim at USF". JWeekly.
- Breiger, Marek (4 November 2004). "S.F. Prof Says Jewish Texts Inspired Ben Franklin". JWeekly.
- Broadway World (26 July 2014). "Andrew R. Heinze's Moses, The Author to Play FringeNYC". Broadway World.
- Chisholm, Christie (13 July 2012). "Tall Entries, Short Plays at Fusion Theatre's Annual Fest". No. V.21 No.23. Alibi.
- Cohen, Jocelyn (June 1999). "Review: How Jews Became White Folks and What That Says About Race in America by Karen Brodkin". H-Net Reviews. H-Net: Humanities & Social Sciences Online. "Brodkin's view radically de-emphasizes Jewish immigrants' assimilationist passions. As historians like Andrew Heinze (whose important 1990 book Adapting to Abundance does not appear in Brodkin's bibliography) have shown, this drive was evident from the start, as was the immigrants' eagerness to meet the cultural demands of belonging in the U.S."
- Diner, Hasia R. (Fall 1992). "Review: Adapting to Abundance: Jewish Immigrants, Mass Consumption, and the Search for American Identity". Journal of American Ethnic History. 12 (1): 117–118. JSTOR 27501023.
- "Freud, Secularism, and Jewish History". newschool.edu. The New School. 25 October 2010. Archived from the original on 5 November 2014.
- Gromelski, Dennis. "An Interview with the Playwright". fusionabq.org. Albuquerque, NM: Fusion Theatre Company. Archived from the original on 24 September 2014.
- Hamill, Susan Pace (2004). "Tax Policy as a Moral Issue Under Judeo-Christian Ethics" (PDF). Swig Lecture Series.
- Harbison, Lawrence, ed. (1 June 2014). The Best Ten-Minute Plays 2011. Hanover, NH: Smith & Kraus. pp. 63–70. ISBN 9781575258867. Archived from the original on 7 March 2015.
- Heinze, Andrew R. (Fall 1989). "Jewish Street Merchants and Mass Consumption in New York City, 1880-1930" (PDF). American Jewish Archives. XLI (2): 199–214.
- Heinze, Andrew R. (October 1992). Adapting to Abundance: Jewish Immigrants, Mass Consumption, and the Search for American Identity. New York, NY: Columbia University Press. ISBN 9780231068536.
- Heinze, Andrew R. (6 April 1998). "The Vatican Repents Catholic Anti-Semitism". San Francisco Examiner.
- Heinze, Andrew R. (13 August 1999). "White Supremacists and Their War Against Jews". San Francisco Examiner.
- Heinze, Andrew R. (September 1999). "The Americanization of Mussar: Abraham Twerski's Twelve Steps". Judaism: A Quarterly Journal of Jewish Life and Thought. 48 (4): 450–469.
- Lattin, Don (16 April 2000). "A Joint Celebration For Christians and Jews". SFGate.
- Heinze, Andrew R. (September 2000). "Clare Boothe Luce and the Jews: A Chapter from the Catholic-Jewish Disputation of Postwar America". American Jewish History. 88 (3): 361–376. doi:10.1353/ajh.2000.0054. S2CID 161821231.
- Heinze, Andrew R. (December 2000). "But Is It History?: World of Our Fathers as a Historicized Text". American Jewish History. 88 (4): 495–510. doi:10.1353/ajh.2000.0065. S2CID 162373071.
- Heinze, Andrew R. (13 April 2001). "CFP:A Symposium On Homosexuality/Tradition". h-net.msu.edu. Humanities and Social Sciences Online. "I'm considering putting together a symposium on new Jewish and Christian (and Muslim?) approaches to homosexuality and would appreciate recommendations for appropriate Protestant and Catholic (and if available, Muslim) speakers. I would want speakers of some standing in their religious communities who are able to make cogent arguments about how Biblical-based faith might reckon more positively with homosexuality..."
- Heinze, Andrew R. (8 April 2002). "The Swig Judaic Studies Program at the University of San Francisco... 'Welcoming our Gay and Lesbian Sisters and Brothers'". h-net.msu.edu. Humanities and Social Sciences Online. "Six distinguished scholars and religious thinkers from across the country will focus on one of the most compelling subjects within the Jewish and Christian worlds today: how can gay and lesbian Jews and Christians find a more comfortable place within their faith-communities?"
- Heinze, Andrew R. (December 2001). "Jews and American Popular Psychology: Reconsidering the Protestant Paradigm of Popular Thought". Journal of American History. 88 (3): 950–978. doi:10.2307/2700394. JSTOR 2700394.
- Heinze, Andrew R. (6 July 2002). "The Only Thing We Have to Fear Is … Scary Monsters". historynewsnetwork.org. History News Network.
- Heinze, Andrew R. (29 July 2002). "W ... You're No TR". historynewsnetwork.org. History News Network.
- Heinze, Andrew (Winter 2002). "Judaism and the Therapeutic Polemics of Postwar America". Religion and American Culture. 12 (1): 31–58. doi:10.1525/rac.2002.12.1.31. JSTOR 10.1525/rac.2002.12.1.31. S2CID 170329755.
- Heinze, Andrew R. (June 2003). "Schizophrenia Americana: Aliens, Alienists, and the "Personality Shift" of Twentieth-Century Culture". American Quarterly. 55 (2): 227–256. doi:10.1353/aq.2003.0015. S2CID 144654043.
- Heinze, Andrew R.; Topp, Michael M.; Berkin, Carol; Casey, Marion; Guglielmo, Thomas; Lewis, Earl; Hodges, Graham R.; Casey, Marion R.; Ngai, Mae M.; Meagher, Timothy (October 2003). Bayor, Ronald H. (ed.). Race and Ethnicity in America: A Concise History. New York, NY: Columbia University Press. pp. 131–166. ISBN 9780231129411.
- Heinze, Andrew R.; Topp, Michael M.; Berkin, Carol; Casey, Marion; Guglielmo, Thomas; Lewis, Earl; Hodges, Graham R.; Casey, Marion R.; Ngai, Mae M.; Meagher, Timothy (July 2004). Bayor, Ronald H. (ed.). Columbia Documentary History of Race and Ethnicity in America. Columbia University Press. pp. 413–598. ISBN 9780231119948.
- Heinze, Andrew R. (October 2004). Jews and the American Soul. Princeton, NJ: Princeton University Press. p. xvi. ISBN 9780691117553.
- Heinze, Andrew R. (24 December 2004). "Breaking the Mold of the Sitcom". The Jewish Daily Forward.
- Heinze, Andrew R. (31 December 2004). "My Grandmother Between Life and Death". The Jewish Daily Forward.
- Heinze, Andrew R. (22 July 2005). "A Lost Chapter From the Life of Oz". JWeekly.
- Heinze, Andrew R. (21 October 2005). "What does 'Vocabulary' Mean?". The Chronicle of Higher Education. Washington, DC.
- Heinze, Andrew R. (3 March 2006). "Life Among the Goyim". The Jewish Daily Forward.
- Heinze, Andrew R. (1 January 2007). Is It 'Cos I's Black: Jews and the Whiteness Problem. Ann Arbor, MI: University of Michigan Press. ISBN 9781881759133.
- Heinze, Andrew R. (31 January 2007). Farther Away from New York: Jews in the Humanities after World War II. Purdue University Press. doi:10.2307/j.ctv2z55190.6.
- Jewish Daily Forward. "Articles by Andrew R. Heinze". New York, NY: Forward Association.
- "Jews and the American Soul: Human Nature in the Twentieth Century by Andrew R. Heinze". press.princeton.edu. Princeton, NJ: Princeton University Press. 2006. "Runner-Up for the 2005 National Jewish Book Award in American Jewish History, Jewish Book Council; Finalist for the 2004 Weinberg Judaic Studies Institute Book Award, University of Scranton."
- Katz, Leslie (24 July 1998). "It's Hebrew All Day, Every Day at New USF Ulpan". JWeekly. "'We even got more than the number we were hoping for,' said Andy Heinze, director of USF's Swig Judaic studies program. 'It's clear to me there's a real demand for this.'"
- Lambert, Josh (16 July 2010). "Cultural Materialism What Do We Think of American Culture?". New York, NY: Jewish Daily Forward. "Koltun-Fromm relies heavily upon, and thus honors, the remarkable works of social history and cultural studies published over the past two decades by the leading lights of American Jewish studies, from Riv-Ellen Prell and Andrew Heinze to Jenna WeissmanJoselit and Jonathan Freedman"
- Mercer, Ilana (2 November 2005). "Soul and Moral Tradition". archive.thejc.com. Jewish Chronicle. Archived from the original on 4 March 2016.
- Merwin, Ted (23 April 2013). "Parlor Room Drama". The Jewish Week. New York, NY. "In an interview, Heinze told The Jewish Week that he spent half of his childhood in a New Jersey development built by William Levitt, who built Levittown on Long Island, as well as in Pennsylvania, Puerto Rico, and other places. 'People who didn't have much money could afford [such developments],' he said. 'It made American life possible.'"
- Merwin, Ted (16 September 2014). "Moses' Sixth Book". The Jewish Week. New York, NY. "In an interview, he told The Jewish Week that 'Moses, the Author' is a 'midrash' that imagines how Moses might have dealt with the series of crushing setbacks that faced him, from having a speech defect to being told that could not enter the Promised Land. In writing the play, Heinze noted, he maintained fidelity to the actual outlines of Moses' life and career."
- New American Theatre. "The 17th Annual Festival of New One Act Plays". newamericantheatre.com. New American Theatre. Archived from the original on 20 October 2014.
- "Orlando Shakespeare Theater Playfest 2011". orlandoshakes.org. Orlando Shakespeare Theater. Archived from the original on 13 October 2014.
- "Orlando Shakespeare Theater Playfest 2014". orlandoshakes.org. Orlando Shakespeare Theater. Archived from the original on 24 September 2014.
- Playwright Festival 2014. "What It Takes to Get Things Done in Washington". citytheatreofindependence.org. Independence, MO: City Theatre of Independence. Archived from the original on 19 September 2014.
- Princeton University Press. "Additional Endorsements: Jews and the American Soul". press.princeton.edu. Princeton University Press.
- "Program History". usfca.edu. University of San Francisco. Archived from the original on 7 October 2014.
- Prothero (22 September 2005). "Is America's Jesus Good for the Jews?". Swig Lecture Series. University of San Francisco. "'Is America's Jesus good for the Jews?' Great question. I wish I had thought of it myself. I did not. It was suggested to me by the director of the Swig Judaic Studies Program, Professor Andrew Heinze, and I thank him both for the kind invitation and for the provocative question."
- Publishers Weekly (23 August 2004). "Review of Jews and the American Soul: Human Nature in the 20th Century". Publishers Weekly. New York, NY.
- Publishers Weekly (6 December 2004). "The Best Books of 2004". Publishers Weekly. New York, NY.
- Rinn, Miriam (15 August 2014). "Off-Broadway Offers Theatrical Yiddishkeit". Jewish Standard.
- Roberts, David (August 2014). "Off-Broadway". theatrereviews.com. New York, NY: Theatre Reviews Limited. Archived from the original on 4 March 2016.
- Samuel French Festival. "Masha: Conditions in the Holy Land". SamuelFrenchNYC. Samuel French. Archived from the original on 24 September 2014.
- Silber, Norman I. (Summer 1991). "Review: Adapting to Abundance: Jewish Immigrants, Mass Consumption, and the Search for American Identity". Journal of Consumer Affairs. 25 (1): 185–188. doi:10.1111/joca.1991.25.issue-1.
- Stahlberg, Lesleigh Cushing (5 November 2008). "Modern Day Moabites: The Bible and the Debate About Same-Sex Marriage" (PDF). Biblical Interpretation. 16 (5): 445–446. doi:10.1163/156851508x329683. "In 2000, the announcement of a symposium on Jewish and Christian approaches to homosexuality at the University of San Francisco was met by public outcry and indignant press coverage…"
- Stone Soup Theatre's Playfest 2011. "The Bar Mitzvah of Jesus Goldfarb" (PDF). Stone Soup Theatre.
- "Summer Ulpan (Hebrew)". University of San Francisco Catalogue. 2014. Archived from the original on 6 October 2014.
- Swig Lecture 1998 (1998). "Jewish-Christian Relations in a Secular Age". Swig Lecture Series. Swig lecture.
- Swig Lecture 1999 (1999). "The New Otherness: Marrano Dualities in the First Generation". Swig Lecture Series. The 1999 Swig lecture.
- Swig Lecture 2000 (2000). "The Inaugural Symposium of the Flannery-Hyatt Institute for Interfaith Understanding". Swig Lecture Series.
- Swig Lecture 2001. "Worshipping Together in Uniform: Christians and Jews in World War II". Swig Lecture Series.
- Swig Lecture 2002 (2002). A Symposium: New Jewish and Christian Approaches to Homosexuality. University of San Francisco.
- Swig Lecture 2003. "The Popes and the Jews". Swig Lecture Series.
- Swig Lecture 2004 (2004). Tax Policy as a Moral Issue Under Judeo-Christian Ethics. University of San Francisco.
- Swig Lecture 2005. "Is America's Jesus Good for the Jews?". stanford.edu. University of San Francisco.
- Texas Nonprofit Theatres'. "The Invention of the Living Room". texastheatres.org. Texas Nonprofit Theatres. Archived from the original on 24 September 2014.
- "University of California, Berkeley: Alumni: Andrew Heinze '80, '87". CAL@cal public profile. Berkeley, CA: UC Berkeley and CAL Alumni Association.
- University of San Francisco. "Emeriti and Retired Faculty and Librarians 2014–2015". USFCA.edu. University of San Francisco. Archived from the original on 14 October 2014. "Emeriti and Retired Faculty and Librarians: Andrew R. Heinze (1994-2006) Professor of History B.A., Amherst College, 1977; M.A., University of California, Berkeley, 1980; Ph.D., University of California, Berkeley, 1987."
- University of Scranton. "Weinberg Judaic Studies Institute 2005 Book Award Winners". scranton.edu. University of Scranton.
- USF News (15 October 1997). "Judaic Studies Celebrates 20th Anniversary Nov. 3". No. 119. University of San Francisco. p. 1.
- Weingarden, Matthew (March 2007). "Belin Lecture looks at cultural exploitation" (PDF). Washtenaw Jewish News. p. 1.
- Weinstein, Natalie (7 November 1997). "Marking 20, USF's Jewish Studies Gets New Boost of Hope, Energy". JWeekly. San Francisco, CA.
- Yad Vashem. "The Righteous Among The Nations". yadvashem.org. Yad Vashem The Holocaust Martyrs' and Heroes' Remembrance Authority. Archived from the original on 9 October 2014.
- Zaccaria, Marcina (12 August 2014). "Moses, the Author – New York International Fringe Festival". Theater Pizzaz. New York, NY.
