= Tales of the City =

Series of novels written by Armistead Maupin

United States first edition cover of the first book in the Tales of the City series

Tales of the City is a series of ten novels written by American author Armistead Maupin from 1978 to 2024, depicting the life of a group of friends in San Francisco, many of whom are LGBTQ. The stories from Tales were originally serialized prior to their publication in novel form, with the first four titles appearing as regular installments in the San Francisco Chronicle, while the fifth appeared in the San Francisco Examiner. The remaining titles were never serialized, but were instead originally written as novels.

Tales of the City has been compared to similar serial novels that ran in other city newspapers, such as The Serial (1976; Marin County), Tangled Lives (Boston), Bagtime (Chicago), and Federal Triangle (Washington, D.C.).

Characters from the Tales of the City series have appeared in supporting roles in Maupin's later novels Maybe the Moon and The Night Listener.

== Titles in the series ==
1. Tales of the City (1978)
2. More Tales of the City (1980)
3. Further Tales of the City (1982)
4. Babycakes (1984)
5. Significant Others (1987)
6. Sure of You (1989)
7. Michael Tolliver Lives (2007)
8. Mary Ann in Autumn (2010)
9. The Days of Anna Madrigal (2014)
10. Mona of the Manor (2024)

== Core characters ==
The series opens with the arrival of Mary Ann Singleton, a naive young woman from Cleveland, Ohio, who is visiting San Francisco on vacation when she impulsively decides to stay. She finds an apartment at 28 Barbary Lane, the domain of the eccentric, marijuana-growing landlady Anna Madrigal, later revealed to be a transgender woman. Mary Ann becomes friends with other tenants of the building: the hippyish, bisexual Mona Ramsey; heterosexual lothario Brian Hawkins; the sinister and cagey roof tenant Norman Neal Williams; and Michael Tolliver, a sweet and personable gay man known to friends as Mouse (as in Mickey).

Beyond the house, lovers and friends guide Mary Ann through her San Francisco adventures. Edgar Halcyon, Mary Ann's and Mona's boss; Edgar's socialite daughter DeDe Halcyon-Day (a character based on real-life art patron Dede Wilsey); and DeDe's scheming bisexual husband Beauchamp Day all provide a glimpse into a more affluent Californian class. Mother Mucca, Mrs. Madrigal's mother and owner of the Blue Moon Lodge brothel, brings mystery and comic relief. D'orothea Wilson returns from a modeling assignment in New York to resume an affair with Mona. Jon Fielding, Michael's lover and DeDe's gynecologist, becomes part of the social group. Michael's lovers later in the series include Thack Sweeney and the significantly younger Ben McKenna.

== Realism in the series ==
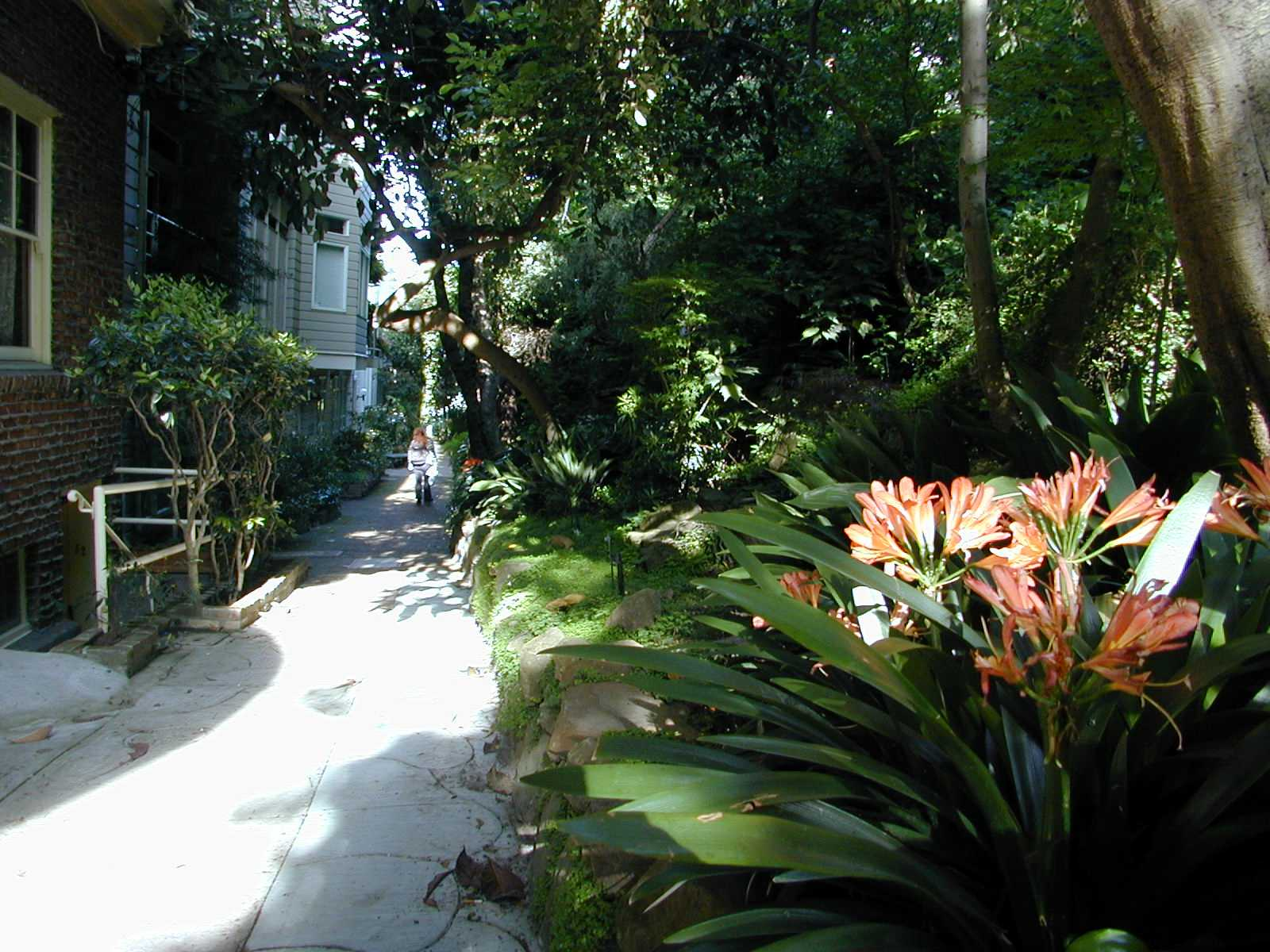
Macondray Lane, recast in the series as the fictional Barbary Lane.

Because installments were published so soon after Maupin wrote them, he was able to incorporate many current events into the plot of the series, as well as gauge reader response and modify the story accordingly.

For example, Maupin once received a letter from a reader of the original serial, who pointed out that Anna Madrigal's name was an anagram for "A Man and a Girl", and Maupin "appropriated the idea".

The AIDS epidemic of the 1980s affected San Francisco's gay community in particular (with many of Maupin's friends dying), which is reflected in the later books of the series.

Real life people such as Jim Jones, Richard Bonynge and a thinly veiled Elizabeth Taylor are mentioned in the story lines. A prominent closeted gay celebrity is represented as "______ ______" throughout the third novel, a reference to Rock Hudson, who was a friend of Maupin.

== Series revival ==
Nearly two decades after Sure of You, Maupin resumed the series with the release of the novel Michael Tolliver Lives. Maupin originally stated that the novel was "NOT a sequel... and it's certainly not Book 7 in the series"; however, he later conceded:

I’ve stopped denying that this is book seven in Tales of the City, as it clearly is ... I suppose I didn’t want people to be thrown by the change in the format, as this is a first-person novel unlike the third-person format of the Tales of the City ... Having said that, it is still very much a continuation of the saga and I think I realized it was very much time for me to come back to this territory.

Michael Tolliver Lives was criticized by one critic for its thinly veiled autobiographical nature and for being the work of a beloved author trying to remember how he did it first time round. Maupin's next novel in the series, Mary Ann in Autumn, returned to the style of the earlier Tales books, a multi-character tapestry of interwoven story lines. The novel The Days of Anna Madrigal was released on January 21, 2014.

== Television adaptations ==
The first book was made into a 1993 television miniseries, produced by Channel 4 in the UK and screened by PBS in the US the next year. Showtime debuted the second and third installments, in 1998 and 2001, respectively; all featured Laura Linney as Mary Ann Singleton, Olympia Dukakis as Anna Madrigal, and Barbara Garrick as DeDe Halcyon-Day.

In 2019, Netflix produced a sequel miniseries. Laura Linney, Olympia Dukakis, Paul Gross and Barbara Garrick all reprised their roles. Linney and Maupin were executive producers, Alan Poul directed, and Michael Cunningham wrote the first episode script. While not a direct adaptation of any of Maupin's novels like the first three miniseries were, this 10-part series takes the core characters along with certain characters and elements from Maupin's later "Tales" novels and weaves them into a new story set mostly in the present day.

== Radio adaptations ==
All of the books except Mona of the Manor (2024) have been adapted and broadcast on BBC Radio 4. The BBC series names and first broadcast dates are:

1. Tales of the City (January/February 2013)
2. More Tales of the City (February 2013)
3. Further Tales of the City (July 2014)
4. Babycakes (July 2014)
5. Significant Others (June/July 2015) which also includes Sure of You.
6. Michael Tolliver Lives (May 2016)
7. Mary Ann in Autumn (May 2016)
8. The Days of Anna Madrigal (July 2017)

== Musical adaptations ==
Maupin has collaborated on several Tales-themed musical projects. In March 1999, he participated in Tunes from Tales (Music for Mouse), a concert series with the Seattle Men's Chorus that included readings from the series and music from the era. Maupin provided a new libretto for Anna Madrigal Remembers, a musical work composed by Jake Heggie and performed by choir Chanticleer and mezzo-soprano Frederica von Stade on 6 August 1999.

After a developmental reading at the Eugene O'Neill Theater Center's National Music Theater Conference in 2009, Armistead Maupin's Tales of the City premiered at the American Conservatory Theater in 2011, with a book by Jeff Whitty and the score by Jake Shears and John "JJ" Garden. The musical stage adaptation ran for two months with direction by Jason Moore, and a cast featuring Judy Kaye as Anna Madrigal, Betsy Wolfe as Mary Ann Singleton, Mary Birdsong as Mona Ramsey, and Wesley Taylor as Michael "Mouse" Tolliver. Reviews were generally positive, with new songs that "range from bawdy comic numbers to traditional solo ballads in which the principals give vent to the secret suffering in their hearts."

== Critical reception ==
In 2019, the BBC News listed Tales of the City on its list of the 100 most influential novels.

== See also ==
- LGBT culture in San Francisco
