= The Days of Anna Madrigal =

2014 novel by Armistead Maupin

- US first edition cover
- Author: Armistead Maupin
- Audio read by: Kate Mulgrew
- Language: English
- Series: Tales of the City
- Genre: Novel
- Published: January 21, 2014
- Publisher: HarperCollins
- Publication place: United States
- Media type: Print (Hardcover)
- Pages: 288
- ISBN: 0-06-219624-3
- Preceded by: Mary Ann in Autumn
- Followed by: Mona of the Manor

The Days of Anna Madrigal (2014) is the ninth book in the Tales of the City series by American novelist Armistead Maupin. It was billed as the final book in the series, although in 2024 Maupin returned to the series with Mona of the Manor.

== Plot summary ==
Anna Madrigal, the 92-year-old former landlady of 28 Barbary Lane, recalls her teen years as Andy Ramsay, the son of a brothel owner in Winnemucca, Nevada. Meanwhile, in the present, Anna's longtime friend and former tenant Michael Tolliver finds that his much-younger husband Ben is a constant reminder of his own mortality. Another former tenant, Brian Hawkins, offers to take Anna for a final visit back to Winnemucca, where she claims she has unfinished business, as Brian's adopted daughter Shawna puts the wheels in motion to have a baby. It all converges at Burning Man, an unlikely destination for Anna.

== Adaptations ==
The book was adapted by Lin Coghlan and broadcast as a ten-part radio drama on BBC Radio 4 in July 2017.
