= Mary Ann in Autumn =

2010 novel by Armistead Maupin

- US first edition cover
- Author: Armistead Maupin
- Audio read by: Armistead Maupin
- Language: English
- Series: Tales of the City
- Genre: Novel
- Published: 2010
- Publisher: HarperCollins
- Publication place: United States
- Media type: Print (Hardcover)
- Pages: 304
- ISBN: 0-06-147088-0
- Preceded by: Michael Tolliver Lives
- Followed by: The Days of Anna Madrigal

Mary Ann in Autumn (2010) is the eighth book in the Tales of the City series by San Francisco novelist Armistead Maupin. It was released on November 2, 2010.

== Premise ==
Mary Ann Singleton, now in her late fifties, returns from New York City with a reason to seek support and a secret that she needs to share with Michael 'Mouse' Tolliver.

== Plot summary ==
Mary Ann Singleton Carruthers flees her luxurious life in Darien, Connecticut for San Francisco, seeking solace from old friend Michael Tolliver. Reeling from both ill health and her husband's infidelity, she asks Michael if she can stay in his guest cottage while she recuperates.

Meanwhile, other former Barbary Lane residents show up in the novel: Mary Ann's adoptive daughter Shawna is a popular sex blogger and is dating Otto, a clown; Anna Madrigal has mostly recovered from the stroke she had in Michael Tolliver Lives; Michael's assistant, Jake Greenleaf, wrestles with his attraction to a closeted Mormon missionary who is involved in the movement to "cure" homosexuals; and Jake, a trans man, despairs of ever saving enough money to pay for surgery. Ironically, his dream of having a hysterectomy is the same nightmare that Mary Ann is facing.

As the novel progresses, Dede and D'Orothea show up to help Mary Ann with her recuperation, Shawna befriends a homeless junkie prostitute, Jake makes a startling discovery, and a threat from the past comes back to haunt the former Barbary Lane residents.
