= Babycakes =

1984 novel by Armistead Maupin

- US first edition cover
- Author: Armistead Maupin
- Audio read by: Alan Cumming
- Language: English
- Series: Tales of the City
- Genre: Novel
- Published: 1984
- Publisher: Harper & Row
- Publication place: United States
- Media type: Print (Paperback)
- Pages: 220
- ISBN: 978-0-060-91099-0
- Preceded by: Further Tales of the City
- Followed by: Significant Others

Babycakes (1984) is the fourth book in the Tales of the City series by American novelist Armistead Maupin, originally serialized in the San Francisco Chronicle.

== Plot elements ==
"Babycakes" is the term of affection the protagonist, Michael "Mouse" Tolliver, uses for his best female friends.

The novel begins in 1983. Elizabeth II and Prince Philip of the United Kingdom are motoring, via limousine motorcade, into San Francisco as part of their visit to the United States. The novel concludes with the queen having a manicure done by the nanny of a former British naval officer who, while in the United States, made the acquaintances of Michael, Mary Ann, Brian and the American and British press.

This work deals with Michael's revelation of Jon Fielding's death from AIDS the previous year, and his lost contact with Mona. Michael must cope with it—and the new "problems" arising from his sex-related behaviour. All is not bleak, but it marks the end of the free love and decadence era of the 1960s, 1970s and early 1980s.

After being absent from Further Tales of the City, the character of Mona Ramsey returns to the Tales series in this book. Mona, now 37 years of age, is living and working in Seattle, Washington, the supposed "San Francisco of the 1980s".
