= Further Tales of the City (novel) =

1982 novel by Armistead Maupin

- US first edition cover
- Author: Armistead Maupin
- Audio read by: Frances McDormand
- Language: English
- Series: Tales of the City
- Genre: Novel
- Published: 1982
- Publisher: Harper & Row
- Publication place: United States
- Media type: Print
- Pages: 239
- ISBN: 978-0-060-90916-1
- Preceded by: More Tales of the City
- Followed by: Babycakes

Further Tales of the City (1982) is the third book in the Tales of the City series by San Francisco novelist Armistead Maupin, originally serialized in the San Francisco Chronicle. It was adapted into the 2001 miniseries Further Tales of the City.

This novel takes place in 1981 during the first year of the Reagan Administration and imagines that the real-life figure of Jim Jones survives the Jonestown massacre. The book also captures the tail end of the post-Stonewall, pre-AIDS era of decadence in the gay culture of the early 1980s as the Michael Tolliver character explores his promiscuous side after breaking up with Jon Fielding.
