= Swig Program in Jewish Studies and Social Justice =

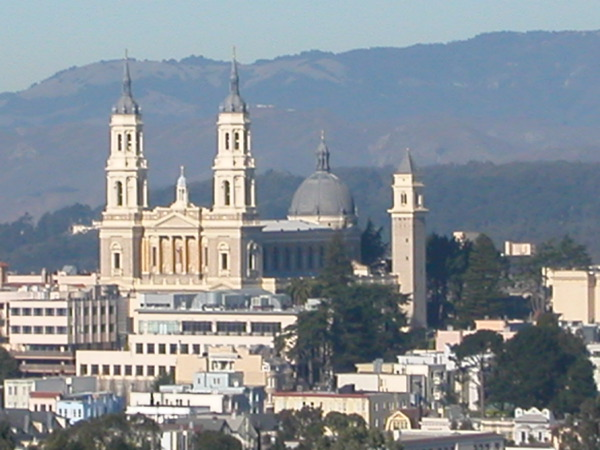
- Motto: “Injustice anywhere is a threat to justice everywhere.” Dr. Martin Luther King, Jr. "It is not upon you to finish the work, but neither are you exempt from participating in it." Rabbi Tarfon
- Established: August 1977; relaunched August 2008
- Director: Aaron Hahn Tapper
- Location: San Francisco, California, United States
- Website: usfca.edu/artsci/jssj

The Swig Program in Jewish Studies and Social Justice is a Jewish studies program at the University of San Francisco in San Francisco, California. Originally founded in 1977, and re-established in 2008, it is the only program in the world to formally link the fields of Social justice and Jewish studies. It offers a minor in Jewish Studies and Social Justice (JSSJ), an annual Social Justice Lecture, an annual Human Rights Lecture, an annual Social Justice Passover Seder, intermittent films, presentations, and workshops, a study-abroad course, and Ulpan San Francisco.

== History ==
Melvin Swig was a San Francisco real estate developer and philanthropist who endowed a multitude of charities, organizations, and programs in the San Francisco Bay Area. In the mid-1970s Swig met Rabbi David Davis who, in conjunction with the Reverend John H. Elliott, a Lutheran minister and USF Theology & Religious Studies professor, had recently begun to teach a class called “Jesus the Jew” at the University of San Francisco. Swig, who was Jewish, was intrigued with the idea of a Jewish perspective being taught at a Catholic university, and he suggested that Rabbi Davis introduce him to Father John Lo Schiavo, the president of the university. The three men explored the idea of creating a Jewish studies program at USF. As a result of their collaboration, in 1977 the Mae and Benjamin Swig Chair in Judaic Studies was established as an homage to Swig's parents. The program was the first Jewish Studies program at a Catholic university worldwide. It was also the first Jewish Studies program at any Bay Area university or college. Swig later became the chairman of the University of San Francisco Board of Trustees.

Rabbi Davis became the first Mae and Benjamin Swig Chair of the university's new program, which was then called the Swig Judaic Studies Program. Davis recalls that Father Lo Schiavo called him a “one man ecumenical movement” because of his work in building bridges between the San Francisco Jewish and Christian communities. Indeed, the collaboration between Swig, who was a prominent leader in the San Francisco Jewish community, and Lo Schiavo, an equally prominent member of the Jesuit community, would never have existed without Rabbi Davis' enthusiasm and encouragement. The new Swig Judaic Studies Program offered workshops, lectures, and seminars, and it partnered with Jewish organizations in the Bay Area for additional educational programming. Rabbi Davis brought world-renowned figures to USF, including Nobel prize recipients Saul Bellow and Elie Wiesel; Erik Erikson, winner of the Pulitzer Prize and National Book Award; and Abba Eban, ambassador from Israel.

In 1997 Andrew R. Heinze, a USF professor of American History who specialized in Jewish studies, was appointed as the new Swig chair. To solidify the program's academic standing, Heinze created a Jewish Studies Certificate program that expanded the curriculum beyond the Theology & Religious studies Department. He introduced courses in Hebrew, Jewish history, The Holocaust, Jewish American literature, and Yiddish culture. Heinze also introduced the Swig Annual Lecture Series: free public lectures delivered by distinguished scholars, which were published and distributed to universities, public libraries, and individual scholars in the United States and abroad. This series included a ground-breaking symposium on new religious approaches to homosexuality, and a symposium on Jewish-Catholic Relations that featured one of the Vatican's pre-eminent officials, Cardinal Edward Cassidy, president of the Pontifical Commission for Religious Relations with the Jews. In 1998 Heinze launched Ulpan San Francisco, an Israeli-style Hebrew immersion program that was scheduled during the summer and served anyone living in the San Francisco Bay area; it was the first such program in Northern California.

In 2007 Aaron Hahn Tapper became the third person to hold the chair. Hahn Tapper, who had earned a BA from Johns Hopkins University, an MA from Harvard Divinity School, and a Doctorate from the University of California, Santa Barbara, focused on "conflict resolution and social relations between Jewish, Muslim, Israeli and Palestinian communities." The University of San Francisco's dean of humanities, Jennifer Turpin welcomed Hahn Tapper's appointment to the Swig chair with the comment, "He's a person who welcomes people with many different points of view and backgrounds to the conversation. His commitment to transforming conflicts between different cultures and faiths is one that really resonates with the university." In fact, in 2006, Hahn Tapper had been formally recognized by former President Bill Clinton for his conflict resolution work with teens and college students.

== The Program Today ==
Hahn Tapper redesigned the program, and in August 2008, drawing on his expertise in the fields of conflict resolution, social identity theory, and social relations between and within the Jewish, Muslim, Israeli, and Palestinian communities, he relaunched the program as the Swig Program in Jewish Studies and Social Justice. The program continues to be the only program in the world to formally link the fields of Social justice and Jewish studies.

The program engages students in both theoretical and practical applications of social justice and activism rooted in the Jewish traditions. On campus the program offers a wide range of Jewish studies courses, a minor in Jewish Studies and Social Justice (JSSJ), an annual Social Justice Lecture, an annual Human Rights Lecture, an annual Social Justice Passover Seder, intermittent films, presentations, and workshops, a study-abroad course, and Hebrew San Frrancisco: Ulpan. In summer 2020 they expanded their summer offerings with the launch of Arabic San Francisco. The program offers a wide range of educational programs focusing on social justice issues, open to the USF community and beyond. Recordings of a number of these events can be found on the program's YouTube channel , all of which have been fitted with closed captions Closed captioning.

The program’s ethos is built upon the following four ideas, all of which are integral to the Jewish community’s vast histories and identities:

- Activism – each of us has a role in the process of shaping the world as it is into the world it can be.
- Intersectionality – all forms of marginalization and oppression are inter-linked.
- Social Identity – each of us has multiple social identities, whether a reflection of our age, citizenship, ethnicity, gender, nationality, physical ability, physical appearance, religion, sexual orientation, socio-economic standing, race, or something else entirely. Some identities are acquired; others, we’re born with.
- Social In/justice – our social identities have a great deal of meaning for us and others. At times they give us access to opportunities. At other times they deny us entry to jobs, homes, and even food. The world in which we live currently functions as if our identities are real. Most of us live as if there is a specific definition to community X or Y, despite the fact that identities are not static but constantly shifting.

Some of the program's most innovative and interesting courses include:

- "Contemporary Political Prophets"
- "Forgiving the Unforgivable? The Ethics of Apologies"
- "Funny Jews: Shaping Jewish American Identities through Comedy"
- "Holocaust and Genocide"
- "The Israeli-Palestinian Conflict through Literature and Film"
- "The Jewish American Experience through Graphic Novels"
- "Jewish and Islamic Mysticism"
- "Jews, Judaisms, and Jewish Identities"
- "Queering Religion"
- "Refugees and Justice"
- "Social Justice, Activism, and Jews"
- "Social Justice and the Israeli-Palestinian Conflict"

To access a number of articles on the Swig Program in Jewish Studies and Social Justice as well Op-Eds written by JSSJ faculty members, see their "In the Media" page online.

== Judaisms: A Twenty-First-Century Introduction to Jews and Jewish Identities ==
In 2016, Hahn Tapper published Judaisms: A Twenty-First-Century Introduction to Jews and Jewish Identities with University of California Press, which won a National Jewish Book Award, considered by some to be the "most prestigious" award in Jewish literature. A number of articles have been written about the book's unique approach to the study of Jews and Judaisms.

== 2018 to 2021 - Fortieth Anniversary, New Faculty, New Rabbi-in-Residence, and the Future ==
In April 2018, the Swig Program in Jewish Studies and Social Justice celebrated its fortieth anniversary with a celebration held in front of a standing room only audience of 1,600 attendees at San Francisco's prestigious synagogue, Congregation Emanu-el. The keynote speaker for the event was Jake Tapper, CNN's host of The Lead, State of the Union, and their Chief Washington Correspondent. Tapper's talk, "Speaking Truth to Power," as well as the entire program of the event, can be found here, on the Youtube Channel of the Swig Program in Jewish Studies and Social Justice.

Springboarding off the success of the Fortieth Anniversary, in August 2018 the Swig Program in Jewish Studies and Social Justice established two new faculty positions. Rabbi Lee Bycel became the inaugural Sinton Visiting Professor in Holocaust, Genocide, and Refugee Studies, and Professor Oren Kroll-Zeldin became the new Assistant Director of the Swig Program in Jewish Studies and Social Justice as well as a faculty member in the Department of Theology & Religious Studies.

In August 2019, the program broke ground yet again, establishing the university's first Rabbi-in-Residence in the school's then 164-year history, Rabbi Camille Shira Angel .
