= Michael Tolliver Lives =

2007 novel by Armistead Maupin

- US first edition cover
- Author: Armistead Maupin
- Audio read by: Armistead Maupin
- Language: English
- Series: Tales of the City
- Genre: Novel
- Published: 2007
- Publisher: HarperCollins
- Publication place: United States
- Media type: Hardback
- Pages: 288
- ISBN: 0-06-076135-0
- OCLC: 76939926
- Dewey Decimal: 813/.54 22
- LC Class: PS3563.A878 M53 2007
- Preceded by: Sure of You
- Followed by: Mary Ann in Autumn

Michael Tolliver Lives (2007) is the seventh book in the Tales of the City series by San Francisco novelist Armistead Maupin.

== Plot summary ==
The novel represents Maupin's return to the Tales of the City characters some 18 years after the sixth book in the series was published. As well as further developing familiar characters, it explores the differences between the San Francisco of the 1980s, bearing the brunt of the developing AIDS crisis, and the city in the first decade of the new millennium. The realities of aging, both distressing and graceful, is a major theme of the book – as well as the generation gap between gay people from the 1970s and 80s and gay people from the 2000s.

In a departure from the third-person style of the original Tales sequence, Michael Tolliver Lives is narrated in the first person by the title character. In the book's opening pages, Michael Tolliver is middle aged and still alive in living HIV-positive for over 20 years now in the year 2006. Michael encounters a half-remembered old flame, prompting him to reflect on his status as a survivor of both the HIV epidemic (which killed many of his peers in the 1980s and 1990s but is now a more treatable chronic illness thanks in part to better medication) and of a San Francisco that has transformed due in large part to the dot com boom. Characters from the original series include Anna Madrigal, the one-time landlady of 28 Barbary Lane; Brian Hawkins and his now-adult daughter Shawna, a pansexual aspiring writer; and Brian's ex-wife Mary Ann Singleton. New characters include Michael's much younger partner Ben, and his transgender co-worker Jake Greenleaf.

Much of the plot's tension derives from the impending death of Michael's elderly mother in Florida, a test case of changes in attitude since she refused to accept Michael's homosexuality in the second Tales book. Several chapters involve a secondary plot thread concerning Michael's relationship with his brother Irwin. Eventually Michael finds himself forced to choose between being present for his mother's last days and attending to an aging Anna, described in the book as part of his "logical" (as opposed to "biological") family.

== Statements by the author ==
Although Maupin originally stated that this novel was "NOT a sequel to Tales [of the City] and it's certainly not Book 7 in the series," he later conceded that "I've stopped denying that this is book seven in Tales of the City, as it clearly is ... I suppose I didn't want people to be thrown by the change in the format, as this is a first person novel unlike the third person format of the Tales of the City books and it's about one character who interrelates with other characters. Having said that, it is still very much a continuation of the saga and I think I realised it was very much time for me to come back to this territory."

In a June 2007 Entertainment Weekly article, Maupin said, "I was interested in pursuing the life of an aging gay man, and Michael was the perfect vehicle ... However, as soon as I started writing, I found that, one by one, all the other characters stepped forward and asked to be present. It felt natural, so I went with it."

Maupin calls the book "a smaller, more personal novel than I've written in the past," and noted that "I've tried to focus on the dailiness of life – which I think is very interesting. The small details that add up to our lives, and how people who thought they were going to be dead 20 years ago are facing mortality by natural causes."

== Critical reception ==
Philip Mayard of KQED, the San Francisco Bay Area PBS affiliate, said, "[I]t's a genuine thrill to find out what's been going on in the lives of these and all of Maupin's other relentlessly lovable characters. Even if you've never read any of Armistead's books, Michael Tolliver Lives is still a fabulous read ... This book is Armistead at his very best. In this humble scribe's opinion, there isn't an author around that can, with so few words, capture the essence of a character like Maupin."

David Leavitt of The New York Times observed, "Like its predecessors, Michael Tolliver Lives is a novel only in the loosest sense of the term. The chapters are independent yet interdependent, flowing into one another gracefully while remaining very much singular entities ... All this is rendered with balance, good humor and compassion. And indeed, if I have a complaint about Michael Tolliver Lives, it may be that for all the pleasure it takes in its own transgressiveness, it comes off as a little too nice ... Despite this, the book is great fun to read. Maupin is a master at sustained and sustaining comic turns."

David L. Ulin of the Los Angeles Times said, "Here, we get a glimpse of what Maupin, at his best, has always done: linked the individual and the collective story, unfolded his narrative against the backdrop of larger events. It's the novel as social history, an aesthetic reminiscent of Balzac, and if Maupin doesn't write with that degree of depth, he does know how to seed a story ... Unfortunately ... the novel remains flat in some essential way ... it's hard to escape the feeling that Maupin is drifting across the surface, letting our familiarity with Michael do much of the narrative work ... Maupin goes out of his way to bring back the original Tales of the City characters along with their respective partners and progeny ... Yet, if for longtime readers these interactions add an air of comfort, they also seem vestigial, even forced. This is particularly true of Mary Ann, who centered the original series and broke up the band, as it were, when she left for New York at the end of Sure of You. Her cameo here feels unlikely, gratuitous even, a tacked-on bit of resolution in a narrative universe that has always thrived on an open-ended edge of possibility."

Philip Hensher of The Observer said, "Michael Tolliver Lives is a sad spectacle; the sight of a novelist who remembers that he used to be lovable and trying to remember how he did it ... The charm of the series was always one of escape; in this sad and unappealingly thin book, what we discover is that the pleasures of Arcadia are pretty much like the pleasures of Clapham. That's honestly not what anyone wants to hear."
