= Sure of You =

1989 novel by Armistead Maupin

- US first edition cover
- Author: Armistead Maupin
- Audio read by: Eric McCormack
- Language: English
- Series: Tales of the City
- Published: 1989
- Publisher: Harper & Row
- Publication place: United States
- Media type: Print (Hardcover)
- Pages: 262
- ISBN: 0-06-016164-7
- Preceded by: Significant Others
- Followed by: Michael Tolliver Lives

Sure of You (1989) is the sixth book in the Tales of the City series by San Francisco novelist Armistead Maupin. The story takes place around the eve of the 1988 presidential election in the U.S., three years after the previous book Significant Others. The book was written as the end of the Tales series and is the antithesis of the first book.

== Theme ==
The 1970s are long gone, taking with them the fun and farce of youth. It's the height of the 1980s, and things are much more serious. Sure of You is often criticized by readers for its darkness. At the center of the story is the need for surety from loved ones and their inability to provide it. Abandonment occurs frequently throughout the novel.

== Plot ==
Set in 1988, three years after the previous novel, the tenants of 28 Barbary Lane have all left to pursue their lives. Recognizing that it has been a long time since she took a vacation, the building's landlady Anna Madrigal decides to travel to Greece to meet with her daughter Mona Ramsey on the island of Lesbos. During her time there, Anna develops a romantic fling with Stratos, a local man, while Mona explores the island and its lesbian pilgrims. Upon learning that Anna has contemplated staying in Greece, Mona urges Anna to sell the boarding house at 28 Barbary Lane and enjoy herself with Stratos.

In San Francisco, Mary Ann Singleton and her husband Brian Hawkins have moved to a condo in the Russian Hill high-rise The Summit with their adopted daughter Shawna. Mary Ann revels in her local stardom as the most recognized television talk-show host in San Francisco. However, the sudden call from television producer Burke Andrews, her old boyfriend, changes everything when he offers her a job as the host of a new, nationally syndicated talk show in New York City.

Meanwhile, Michael "Mouse" Tolliver and his boyfriend Thack Sweeney have purchased a home together. Michael continues to co-own his nursery Plant Parenthood with Brian while monitoring his scheduled AZT dosages to keep his HIV infection in check. After the death of his father, Michael's conservative mother Alice has also begun contacting him frequently, developing a close relationship with Thack. Michael, however, resents the way she ignored his deceased lover Jon up until his death from AIDS, and her lack of true validation of his life in San Francisco. Thack urges Michael to become involved in the gay political movement, especially ACT-UP, though Michael prefers to focus on what time he has left. Thack and Brian have become close, but Thack has developed a distaste for Mary Ann, much to Michael's frustration. However, Michael admits that he feels Mary Ann has been keeping her distance, believing that she may be trying to spare herself the pain of his one day succumbing to AIDS.

Brian continues to immerse himself in his role as partner at the nursery and as a househusband to Mary Ann and father to Shawna. He remains unaware of Mary Ann's job offer until an obvious blind item in the local paper suggests that Mary Ann is being courted for New York. Mary Ann reveals to Michael that she plans to take the job, but has since fallen out of love with Brian. She hopes to get a divorce in order to spare Brian the embarrassment of moving from his home and friends to follow a relationship that she feels has outlived itself for both of them. She also feels that this way, Brian can continue his work at the nursery and take care of Shawna while she can seek the kind of relationship she has always wanted. She asks Michael to keep it a secret until she can break the news to Brian.

However, Brian is enthused by Mary Ann's move and obliviously begins making plans to leave San Francisco and start again in New York. While discussing the future with Michael, he mistakes Michael's discomfort over Mary Ann's secret for hurt over his leaving. At Brian's insistence, Michael reluctantly reveals Mary Ann's intentions, which devastates Brian. After he confronts her, Mary Ann is furious with Michael, who feels trapped between his friendship with both of them. Brian stays with Thack and Michael for the time being, and Mary Ann accepts the new position and begins making preparations for her move to New York by the end of the month, including rubbing elbows with famous fashion designer Russell Rand (relatively known to be a closeted homosexual by the LGBT community) and his celebrity wife Chloe.

As Michael reflects on the toll of the AIDS crisis, the deaths of his friends and former lover, and sees the continued deterioration of the once vibrant gay men in his community, he begins to wonder if he has the luxury to be unpolitical. A sudden purple growth on his leg underscores that he may not have much time left. Mary Ann invites him to a black-tie event to reconcile, where they run into the Rands. While alone, Russell makes a pass at Michael, who rebuffs him while calling Russell a coward for hiding his sexuality from the public, contributing to the stunted political progress the gay community is experiencing while trying to draw more attention and resources to the AIDS crisis. When Mary Ann learns of their altercation, she scolds Michael, and he angrily breaks from her, feeling that her interest in stardom has replaced her ability to recognize the social justice issues at hand.

Michael goes in for treatment and finds, to his relief, that the growth on his leg was only a bruise from when he bumped into a picnic table days earlier and is not Kaposi's sarcoma; he has not yet developed AIDS. He writes a letter to his mother, finally urging her to accept the life he has built in San Francisco and to respect his wishes for him to be buried in San Francisco should he die before her. Anna Madrigal returns from Greece, and the three men have dinner with her. Anna consoles Brian and urges him to talk with Mary Ann one last time before she leaves and receive closure for his own well being. She also reveals that she has chosen to stay in San Francisco despite her feelings for Stratos. As Mary Ann prepares to move, she spends the day with Shawna and gives her a suitcase full of her birth mother's personal effects. Mary Ann reflects on her original distaste for Connie, Shawna's birth mother, and now has nostalgia for their "tacky, Midwestern" origins in their hometown of Cleveland. Brian returns, the two have a quiet reconciliation, and Brian urges Mary Ann to make peace with Michael before it's too late.

The novel ends a few months afterward; Brian and Mary Ann have amicably divorced, Mary Ann's transition to New York has been a success, and Brian and Michael continue working at the nursery, with Brian finding that he has new prospects as a once more single, available man.

== Writing ==
Though the first five books in the series were originally serialized in the San Francisco Chronicle or the San Francisco Examiner, Sure of You was written solely as a novel.

== Reception ==
Publishers Weekly praised the novel, calling it a "smart, wistful conclusion" to Maupin's Tales of the City series, and praising Maupin's humor and characters.
