= More Tales of the City (novel) =

1980 novel by Armistead Maupin

- US first edition cover
- Author: Armistead Maupin
- Audio read by: Cynthia Nixon
- Language: English
- Series: Tales of the City
- Genre: Novel
- Published: 1980
- Publisher: Harper & Row
- Publication place: United States
- Media type: Print
- Pages: 246
- ISBN: 978-0-060-90726-6
- OCLC: 5353877
- Dewey Decimal: 813/.5/4
- LC Class: PS3563.A878 M67
- Preceded by: Tales of the City
- Followed by: Further Tales of the City

More Tales of the City (1980) is the second book in the Tales of the City series by San Francisco novelist Armistead Maupin, originally serialized in the San Francisco Chronicle. It was adapted into the 1998 miniseries More Tales of the City.

== Plot ==
The story begins a couple of months after the end of Tales of the City. Michael ("Mouse") Tolliver and Mary Ann Singleton go on a cruise on the Pacific Princess, thanks to money left to her by her former, now-deceased boss, Edgar Halcyon. While on the cruise, Mary Ann begins a relationship with a handsome amnesiac, while Mouse rekindles his relationship with his former boyfriend Jon, who has now distanced himself from the "A Gays" after getting fed up with their elitist and shallow ways. Mary Ann begins to devote her time to helping her now-boyfriend, Burke Andrew, figure out why he lost his memory. Signs point to a trauma he had while reporting on a story for his newspaper. What they find out is explosive and risks shaking the foundations of San Francisco elite society. Meanwhile, Mouse becomes extremely ill and is hospitalized, profoundly affecting his relationship with Jon.

== Coming Out Letter ==
Michael Tolliver receives a letter from his parents in which they proclaim their strong support for Anita Bryant and her Save Our Children campaign. In response, Michael writes his parents a coming out letter in which he proudly states his homosexuality:

I hope especially that you’ll see this as an act of love on my part, a sign of my continuing need to share my life with you. I wouldn’t have written, I guess, if you hadn’t told me about your involvement in the Save Our Children campaign. That, more than anything, made it clear that my responsibility was to tell you the truth, that your own child is homosexual, and that I never needed saving from anything except the cruel and ignorant piety of people like Anita Bryant.

— Armistead Maupin, More Tales of the City

The letter deals with many Christian and anti-gay viewpoints through themes of LGBTQ+ acceptance, community, and love. According to Maupin, this coming out letter was "the easiest thing [he's] ever written," being completed in under an hour. Maupin read the letter publicly at the Moon Over Miami Benefit and the letter has since been read out and lauded by many public figures and celebrities, including Ian McKellen, Nathan Lane, and Russell Tovey.

The letter was first published in The San Francisco Chronicle on May 16, 1977 before being adapted into the second book in his series, More Tales of the City.
