= Maybe the Moon =

1992 novel by Armistead Maupin

- US first edition cover
- Author: Armistead Maupin
- Language: English
- Genre: Novel
- Published: 1992
- Publisher: HarperCollins
- Publication place: United States
- Media type: Print (Hardcover)
- Pages: 307
- ISBN: 0-06-016552-9

Maybe the Moon is a 1992 novel written by San Francisco novelist Armistead Maupin.

The story Maupin describes as 'partly autobiographical', despite the main character being a female heterosexual Jewish dwarf. The character was also based on his friend Tamara De Treaux, who was the actor for E.T.

Former tennis player Jim Courier read this book during a changeover.

According to Maupin's website, Maybe the Moon may have been the last book Jacqueline Kennedy Onassis ever read. Daryl Hannah who, at the time, was dating Jackie's son John Kennedy Jr., had optioned the book to produce a film version. She asked Jackie to read the book and give her an opinion.
