= Benjamin Swig =

American real estate developer

- Born: November 17, 1893; Taunton, Massachusetts, U.S.
- Died: October 31, 1980 (age 86); San Francisco, California
- Occupation: real estate developer
- Known for: Co-founder of Swig, Weiler & Arnow
- Spouse: Mae Aronovitz (m. 1916; died 1957)
- Children: Melvin Swig
- Father: Simon Swig

Benjamin Harrison Swig (born November 17, 1893 – October 31, 1980) was an American real estate developer and a philanthropist active in Jewish and non-Jewish communities.

== Biography ==
Taunton, Massachusetts-born Benjamin Swig was the son of banker and politician Simon Swig and the father of Melvin Swig. After Simon died, Benjamin became treasurer of the Tremont Trust Company in Boston.

From 1925 to 1945, Benjamin Swig was a real estate operator. He was a partner of the real estate firm Swig, Weiler and Arnow that was founded in 1936, which became the Swig company.

In the 1940s, he moved to San Francisco, which he loved. He bought the Fairmont Hotel in 1945, and later the St. Francis Hotel.

In 1956, he purchased the Mission Inn in Riverside. He sold 1,000 artworks and artifacts from the hotel to revitalize its finances to no avail.

In the early 1970s, the troubled elections at the Santa Clara University led the students to picket the Fairmont Hotel to protest against Benjamin Swig, who also served as SCU's Chairman of the board of trustees. After Swig repeatedly petitioned in his favor, the City of San Francisco granted the Key of the City to Sun Myung Moon in 1973.

In 1977, his son Melvin created the Mae and Benjamin Swig Chair in Judaic Studies at the University of San Francisco, the first ever Jewish Studies chair and program at a Catholic university worldwide.

== Other tenures ==
- Member of the Board of directors of the American Joint Distribution Committee
- Member of the national Boards of the United Jewish Appeal
- Member of the Israel Bond Organization
- Member of the American Jewish Committee
- Member of the Zionist Organization of America
- Member of the Jewish Welfare Board
- Member of the Jewish Telegraphic Agency

== Awards and recognition ==
- Knighted twice by the Vatican
- Outstanding Civilian Service Medal

== Personal life ==
Benjamin Swig married Mae Aronovitz on December 24, 1916. They remained together until her death in 1957. Swig died on October 31, 1980 after a long illness.

== Bibliography ==
- Bernice Scharlach (2000). Dealing from the Heart: A Biography of Benjamin Swig. Scottwall Assoc. ISBN 0942087186.
