= Tales of the City (novel) =

1978 novel by Armistead Maupin

- US first edition cover
- Author: Armistead Maupin
- Audio read by: Frances McDormand
- Language: English
- Series: Tales of the City
- Genre: Novel
- Published: 1978
- Publisher: Harper & Row
- Publication place: United States
- Media type: Print (Paperback)
- Pages: 240
- ISBN: 0-06-090654-5
- Followed by: More Tales of the City

Tales of the City (1978) is the first book in the Tales of the City series by American novelist Armistead Maupin, originally serialized in the San Francisco Chronicle. Set in 1970s San Francisco, it follows the residents of a small apartment complex at 28 Barbary Lane, including the eccentric landlady, Anna Madrigal.

== Background ==
Tales of the City was originally serialized in the Pacific Sun (beginning in 1974) and then the San Francisco Chronicle. Maupin said that early on he kept gay character Michael "low-key", feeling that the newspaper would "say no if they saw what I was up to". He was more comfortable bringing gay characters in when the column gained a solid following. His editors were still squeamish, and one kept a character chart which Maupin said was intended to ensure "that the homo characters didn't suddenly outnumber the hetero ones and thereby undermine the natural order of civilization".

To produce the novel, Maupin assembled and reimagined his first year of columns while staying at Rock Hudson's house in Bermuda Dunes, California.

== Plot ==
In 1976, secretary Mary Ann Singleton visits San Francisco from Cleveland, Ohio, and impulsively decides to stay. She finds an apartment at 28 Barbary Lane, a small complex owned by the eccentric, marijuana-growing Anna Madrigal. Mary Ann befriends the other tenants of the building: hippyish, bisexual Mona Ramsey; heterosexual lothario Brian Hawkins; Michael Tolliver, a sweet and personable gay man known to friends as "Mouse"; and Norman Neal Williams, the tenant of the rooftop shed. Mary Ann gets a job as secretary to Edgar Halcyon, the abrasive, wealthy owner of the advertising agency where Mona works as a copywriter. Mary Ann finally gives in to the advances of ad exec Beauchamp Day, who is unhappily married to Edgar's socialite daughter DeDe, but he is unable to perform when in bed with Mary Ann. Edgar is dying, but has not told his family; he meets Anna in the park and they begin an extramarital romance. Beauchamp deliberately leaves Mary Ann's scarf in his car to be found by an attention-starved DeDe, who has sex with Lionel Wong, an 18-year-old delivery boy. Mouse meets handsome gynecologist Jon Fielding, and finds that he does not want to engage in casual sex with anyone else. He wins $100 in an underwear dance contest, but loses Jon over it. Jon confirms DeDe's suspicion that she is pregnant. Black model D'orothea Wilson arrives from New York, hoping to resume her romance with Mona; Anna is heartbroken when Mona moves in with D'orothea without saying goodbye. Norman is secretly investigating Anna on behalf of Mona's mother. Columnist Carson Callas blackmails DeDe into sleeping with him, in exchange for which he will not reveal her pregnancy. Beauchamp's renewed attentiveness to DeDe wanes, and she decides to keep her baby. At the baths, Jon has sex with a man he has not met before—Beauchamp. Mona discovers that D'orothea is really Caucasian, and has been darkening her skin to help her modeling career. As Edgar is dying at home, DeDe and Beauchamp tell him he is going to be a grandfather. Mary Ann has been spending time with Norman, but discovers that he is a child pornographer. When she confronts him, he slips and falls off a cliff. Mary Ann finds his file on Anna, and destroys it.

== Characters ==
- Mary Ann Singleton, a prudish naive from Cleveland, Ohio, who impulsively decides to leave her sheltered life and turn a vacation to San Francisco into a new chapter in her life.
- Anna Madrigal, the landlady of 28 Barbary Lane and a supplier of marijuana. Anna fosters a maternal relationship with each of her tenants, perhaps most aggressively with Mona Ramsey. In addition to gently encouraging Mary Ann to develop relationships, she begins an affair with Edgar Halcyon, which is threatened by Anna's dark secret.
- Mona Ramsey, Mary Ann's spacey, bohemian neighbor. Restless and somewhat melancholic, Mona finds herself unemployed after a particularly self-righteous day at the office. She lets her old friend Mouse stay in her apartment after his male lover ends their relationship, but she moves out to rekindle a relationship with D'orothea Wilson.
- Michael "Mouse" Tolliver, Mona's best friend and eventual roommate. A confident gay man, he moves in with Mona after his then-boyfriend ends their relationship, only to begin a new relationship with Jon Fielding, a gynecologist.
- Brian Hawkins, a waiter and ex-lawyer who also lives at 28 Barbary Lane. Considered a womanizer by nearly everyone he knows he spends much of his spare time searching nightclubs and taverns for women.
- Norman Neal Williams, a skittish recluse of a man who lives in the rooftop shed at 28 Barbary Lane. Mary Ann befriends and then begins dating him before learning that he makes child pornography. Norman later falls to his death when Mary Ann confronts him.
- Jon Fielding, a good looking gynecologist who is Mouse's boyfriend for a short time. While Jon himself is a down-to-earth and caring man, his main friends are the 'A-Gays', a group of wealthy, snobbish homosexual men who are judgmental of almost everyone, including younger effeminate gay men like Mouse who they feel are just useful for random flings.
- DeDe Halcyon Day, a well-known San Francisco socialite and the daughter of Edgar Halcyon. She is in an unhappy marriage to Beauchamp Day, and his infidelity prompts her into her own.
- Beauchamp Day, DeDe's narcissistic and philandering husband.
- Edgar Halcyon, the head of Halcyon Communications. He and his wife Frannie have become less fond of each other and, when he learns that he is dying, he begins an affair with Anna Madrigal. Edgar is protective of his daughter DeDe, which strains his relationship with Beauchamp, his son-in-law and employee.
- Frannie Halcyon, Edgar's wife and DeDe's mother. She spends most of her day in an oblivious, alcohol-induced haze.
- D'orothea Wilson, a successful African American model who comes back to San Francisco to find Mona, her ex-lover. It is later revealed that she is in fact a white woman, using makeup and tanning oil to appear black.
