= Simon Swig =

American politician

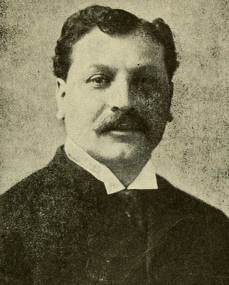
- Born: 1862; Pren, Russian Empire
- Died: July 30, 1939 (aged 76–77); Taunton, Massachusetts, U.S.
- Occupations: Banker, politician
- Spouse: Fannie Levy (m. 1881; died 1934)
- Children: 11, including Benjamin
- Relatives: Melvin Swig (grandson)

Simon Swig (1862 – July 30, 1939) was an American banker, politician and philanthropist.

== Biography ==
Swig was born in Pren (now called Prienai), Russian Empire in 1862. In 1875, when Swig was 13, he immigrated to the United States. He quickly saw success in the U.S. banking industry, promptly earning enough to bring his parents to the United States. As his banking career grew, Swig also became involved in politics in his adopted home state of Massachusetts.

Swig died on July 30, 1939, at the age of 76, of generalized arteriosclerosis and essential hypertension, at the Chase Convalescent Home in Taunton, Massachusetts, where he was living at that time.

== Financial career ==
In the early 20th century, Swig became Vice President of the Tremont Trust Company, in Boston, Massachusetts, which soon became known colloquially as "Simon Swig's Bank." Swig installed his son, Benjamin Swig, as the bank's treasurer. Alongside Tremont, Swig also gained control of the Tamiami Banking of Company of Miami, Florida in 1926.

Swig was a popular figure in the Boston banking world, but rose to prominence for his involvement in uncovering Charles Ponzi's banking irregularities known as the "Ponzi Scheme."

=== Charles Ponzi ===
Early in his career, con man Charles Ponzi rented a room in an office on Court Street, above the Puritan Trust Company. From that office, he hatched his first scheme, which involved stealing 5,387 pounds of cheese, valued at nearly three thousand dollars. Ponzi avoided jail due to a court clerk misspelling his name as "Charles Pouzi," but his good luck ended shortly afterwards; Tremont Trust bought the Court Street building, and Swig wanted the swindler out of his new building.

Ponzi and Swig's interactions did not end there. Once Ponzi's infamous scheme got started, he began keeping a large portion of his assets in Tremont Trust. As neither man liked the other, the money did not stay there long. On July 21, 1920, Swig wrote Ponzi a letter demanding he close his accounts:

If what we have heard about your plan of business is true, then certainly we do not care to accept your deposits, no matter how large they may be. And even if reports are untrue, we do not care to accept your future deposits because you have taken unfair advantage in using our name as you have. We therefore advise you that henceforth your deposits will not be accepted, and you will favor us by closing your account.

Ponzi did as Swig asked, leaving only $185,000, which was tied up in a lawsuit.

One week later, as suspicion of Ponzi's success began to appear in the Boston Post, Swig took out a full-page ad which read, "Our dividends are paid out of our earned and collected income, and not out of other fellow's principal." The ad did not mention Ponzi by name, but it was clear to Boston whom it was about. Another ad ran by Swig read, "REAL DOLLARS are still made in the old-fashioned way--working and saving. A real dollars cannot be made from bubbles," which was clearly aimed at Ponzi as well. Swig appeared in an article in the Post a month later, written by William McMasters, Ponzi's former publicity agent. The article revealed that Ponzi was "hopelessly insolvent" and contained a quote from Swig questioning Ponzi's sanity.

Ponzi was finished, and facing indictments and prison time, largely thanks to Swig.

=== Banking practices ===
Aside from his fame in the banking world due to his involvement in taking down Charles Ponzi, Swig made two bold steps in managing his business affairs that were ahead of his time, both of which unfortunately contributed significantly to the downfall of his banking career. Swig proposed that if the banking system collected interest on loans, it should pay interest on deposits as well–-an idea that today appears reasonable, but at the time was unheard of. As a lawmaker, he even raised this idea as a draft bill in the State Legislature of Massachusetts while he served there as a State Representative.

Perhaps more controversial was Swig's hiring process. Swig was proud of his Jewish heritage and expressed it openly and encouraged others to be proud of their heritages. With that philosophy in mind, Swig did something that was simply not done at the time; he employed Jews, women and African-Americans as tellers at his banks branches. The practice was not appreciated in Boston, particularly by the local Bankers Guild. Collaborating in a manner which is illegal today, competing bankers made a move against him: they deposited immense amounts of money in his bank, which he then used to provide loans to others, and once the Guild was assured that the money had been loaned out, it made a "run" on his bank and tried to withdraw all of its funds at one time. Swig managed to repay the Guild's money, but was dispossessed of his business.

== Political career ==
Aside from banking, Swig enjoyed a storied career in Massachusetts politics. He served six terms as an alderman in Taunton, Massachusetts and five terms in the Massachusetts State Legislature, representing Taunton for two terms and Roxbury for three terms. He was also chairman and treasurer of the Republican City Committee in Taunton and held a position as a State Hospital Trustee for fifteen years under three different governors.

== Personal life ==
Swig married Pearl Fannie Levy on June 7, 1881, and remained married until she died in 1934. Swig and Levy had eleven children, including Benjamin Harrison Swig, who became chairman of the Fairmont Hotel. Swig's descendants included Fairmont heir Melvin Swig, and notable real estate developers and philanthropists Steven, Robert and Kent Swig.

== See also ==
- 1916 Massachusetts legislature
- 1917 Massachusetts legislature
- 1918 Massachusetts legislature
