= Logical Family =

2017 memoir by Armistead Maupin

- First edition
- Language: English
- Genre: Memoir
- Publisher: HarperCollins
- Publication date: 2017
- Publication place: United States
- ISBN: 978-0-06-239122-3

Logical Family: A Memoir is a 2017 memoir by author Armistead Maupin. In the book, Maupin recounts growing up as a young conservative in the Southeastern United States and becoming a gay writer in San Francisco, California.
