= Melvin Swig =

American businessman

- Born: Melvin Morse Swig; July 31, 1917; Boston, Massachusetts, U.S.
- Died: May 14, 1993 (aged 75); San Francisco, California
- Education: Brown University (BA)
- Known for: Real estate investor
- Spouse(s): Phyllis Diamond (m. 1939; div. 1951) Marcia Hove (m. 1955; div. 1965) Dolores Cochrane (m. 1971; died 1987)) Charlotte Mailliard (m. 1988)
- Children: 4
- Father: Benjamin Swig
- Relatives: Simon Swig (grandfather)

Melvin Morse Swig (July 31, 1917 – May 14, 1993) was an American real estate developer and philanthropist. He was also the owner of the National Hockey League's California Golden Seals and Cleveland Barons.

== Early life and education ==
Swig was born to a Jewish family in Boston, a son of Benjamin Swig and grandson of politician and banker Simon Swig. He graduated from Brown University in 1939.

== Career ==
Swig was a real estate developer and philanthropist in San Francisco and New York. He was heir to the Fairmont Hotel chain, and former chairman of the Swig, Weiler & Dinner Development Company, of San Francisco and Manhattan, a family-owned real estate company with holdings including the Fairmont Hotels. Swig served in the United States Army in World War II and later moved to San Francisco in 1946.

Swig was President of the Jewish Community Federation and the Jewish Community Endowment Fund in San Francisco. He established the Swig Judaic Studies Program at the University of San Francisco and he also served as chairman of the board.

Swig owned the California Golden Seals after purchasing them in 1975. While he planned to move the team to San Francisco with a new arena, failures to get an arena planned by local politicians meant the end of the Seals. He took the advice of minority owner George Gund III, who suggested that his hometown of Cleveland would be idea for hockey and thus the Seals moved to become the Cleveland Barons on July 14, 1976. Fortunes did not improve for Cleveland, as the first season saw a young team get brutalized on the ice and in the box office, with ownership asking players to take a salary deferment for months. Players later threatened to boycott games until they were paid, which saw Swig, the league and its players association provide a combined $1.3 million to pay the players. Swig was bought out by the Gund brothers in the offseason.

== Personal life ==
Swig was married four times. In 1939, he married Phyllis Diamond with whom he had two children; they divorced in 1951. Swig then married Marcia Hove and had twin sons; they divorced in 1965. His third wife was Dolores Cochrane, who had two daughters from a previous marriage. They were married for seventeen years until her death from lung cancer in 1987. His fourth wife was Charlotte Mailliard (née Smith), and they remained together until his death in 1993 at age 75. After his death, she married George Pratt Shultz, who had served as the U.S. Secretary of State from 1982 to 1989.
