= Armistead Maupin =

American writer (born 1944)

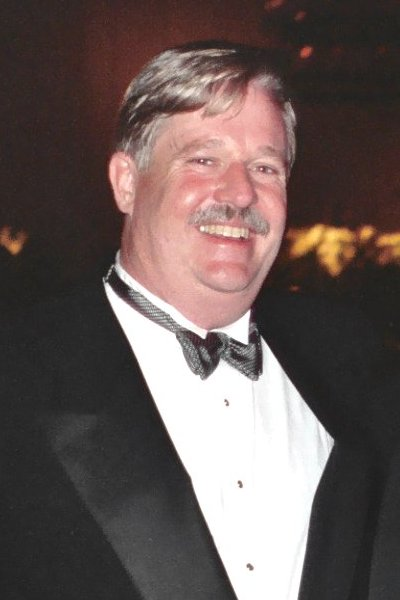
- Armistead in 1994
- Born: Armistead Jones Maupin, Jr. May 13, 1944 (age 82); Washington, D.C., U.S.
- Education: University of North Carolina at Chapel Hill
- Occupation: Author
- Spouse: Christopher Turner (m. 2007)
- Relatives: Sarah Jane Morris (cousin)
- Writing career
- Notable work: Tales of the City
- Armistead Maupin's voice Recorded September 2007 from the BBC Radio 4 programme Bookclub

Armistead Jones Maupin Jr. (/ˈmɔːpɪn/ MAW-pin; born May 13, 1944) is an American writer notable for Tales of the City, a series of novels set in San Francisco.

== Early life ==
Maupin was born in Washington, D.C., to Diana Jane (Barton) and Armistead Jones Maupin. His great-great-grandfather, Congressman Lawrence O'Bryan Branch, was from North Carolina and was a railroad executive and a Confederate general during the American Civil War. His father, Armistead Jones Maupin, founded Maupin, Taylor & Ellis, one of the largest law firms in North Carolina. Maupin was raised in Raleigh.

Maupin attended Ravenscroft School and graduated from Needham Broughton High School in 1962. He attended the University of North Carolina at Chapel Hill, where he wrote for The Daily Tar Heel.

== Career ==
Maupin worked at WRAL-TV in Raleigh, a station managed by future U.S. Senator Jesse Helms. Helms nominated Maupin for a patriotic award, which Maupin won. Maupin said he was a typical conservative and segregationist at this time and admired Helms as a hero figure. Maupin later changed his opinion and condemned Helms at a gay pride parade on the steps of the North Carolina State Capitol. Maupin is a veteran of the U.S. Navy and served several tours of duty including one in the Vietnam War.

Maupin worked at a Charleston newspaper and the San Francisco bureau of the Associated Press in 1971. In 1974, he began what would become the Tales of the City series as a serial in a Marin County-based newspaper, the Pacific Sun, moving to the San Francisco Chronicle after the Sun's San Francisco edition folded.

In 1978, Maupin publicly accused San Francisco Police Inspector Dave Toschi of faking one of the Zodiac Killer's taunting letters to the media, seriously and irreparably damaging Toschi's career and reputation. Maupin claimed to have noticed a similarity between anonymous fan mail Toschi had sent him after Maupin based one of his Tales of the City characters on him, and a Zodiac letter received by the San Francisco Chronicle on April 24, 1978. Although the USPS crime lab cleared Toschi of being the Zodiac letter's author, Toschi admitted to writing the fan mail and was removed from the case, destroying his chances of succeeding Charles Gain as chief of the San Francisco PD. The incident is portrayed in the 2007 David Fincher film Zodiac.

== Works ==
=== Tales of the City ===
Tales of the City is a series of novels, the first portions of which were published initially as a newspaper serial starting on August 8, 1974, in a Marin County newspaper, The Pacific Sun, picked up in 1976 by the San Francisco Chronicle, and later reworked into the series of books published by HarperCollins (then Harper and Row). The first of Maupin's novels, entitled Tales of the City, was published in 1978. Five more followed in the 1980s, ending with the last book, Sure of You, in 1989.

A seventh novel published in 2007, Michael Tolliver Lives, continues the story of some of the characters. It was followed by an eighth volume, Mary Ann in Autumn, published in 2010 and a ninth volume, The Days of Anna Madrigal, in 2014. In Babycakes, published in 1984, Maupin was one of the first writers to address the subject of AIDS. Of the autobiographical nature of the characters, he says "I've always been all of the characters in one way or another."

The Tales of the City books have been translated into ten languages, and there are more than six million copies in print. Several of the books have been adapted and broadcast on BBC Radio 4.

==== Television miniseries ====
The first three books in the series have also been adapted into three television miniseries starring Olympia Dukakis and Laura Linney. A co-production with the UK's Channel 4, the first miniseries was on PBS; subsequent miniseries appeared on Showtime. Dukakis, Linney, and various other cast members from the original series, reunited for the 2019 Tales miniseries on Netflix which was not based directly on one of Maupin's novels but used elements from several, including the latter three.

==== Musical projects ====
He collaborated on Anna Madrigal Remembers, a musical work written by Jake Heggie and performed by choir Chanticleer and mezzo-soprano Frederica von Stade on August 6, 1999, for which Maupin provided a new libretto. He also participated in a concert series with the Seattle Men's Chorus entitled Tunes From Tales (Music for Mouse), which included readings from his books and music from the era.

In May 2011, a theatrical musical version of Tales of the City had its premiere at American Conservatory Theater in San Francisco. The musical has a score and lyrics by Jake Shears and John Garden of the rock band Scissor Sisters, and a book by Jeff Whitty. It was directed by Jason Moore.

=== Maybe the Moon and The Night Listener ===
Maupin wrote two novels, Maybe The Moon and The Night Listener, which are not part of Tales.

Maybe The Moon is a story Maupin describes as "partly autobiographical", despite the main character being a female heterosexual Jewish dwarf. The character was also based on his friend Tamara De Treaux, who played the title character in the 1982 film E.T. the Extra-Terrestrial.

The Night Listener is a roman à clef, inspired by Maupin's experiences concerning the Anthony Godby Johnson hoax. He says he wanted to create a psychological thriller, while being able to put autobiographical elements in it. The issues he addresses include the ending of his relationship with his long-term partner and his relationship with his father. The book very lightly references the Tales world via Gabriel Noone's assistant, who is one of DeDe Halcyon-Day's twins from Tales. It was serialized on the internet, on Salon.com, prior to its print publication. The Night Listener was adapted into a movie that was screened at the Sundance Film Festival in late January 2006 and released by Miramax the following August.

=== Michael Tolliver Lives ===
Prior to the 2007 release of Michael Tolliver Lives, Maupin had been quoted on his website as saying that another Tales of the City novel was unlikely. Although Maupin originally stated that this novel was "NOT a sequel to Tales [of the City] and it's certainly not Book 7 in the series," he later conceded that "I've stopped denying that this is book seven in Tales of the City, as it clearly is ... I suppose I didn't want people to be thrown by the change in the format, as this is a first person novel unlike the third person format of the Tales of the City books and it's about one character who interrelates with other characters. Having said that, it is still very much a continuation of the saga and I think I realised it was very much time for me to come back to this territory."

The novel is written from the first-person perspective of Tales character Michael 'Mouse' Tolliver, now in his fifties and living as an HIV-positive man. It also features appearances by familiar Tales characters, such as Anna Madrigal. Maupin said: "I was interested in pursuing the life of an aging gay man, and Michael was the perfect vehicle ... However, as soon as I started writing, I found that, one by one, all the other characters stepped forward and asked to be present. It felt natural, so I went with it." He calls it "a smaller, more personal novel than I've written in the past." The book was released on June 12, 2007, which was declared 'Michael Tolliver Day' by the mayor of San Francisco.

Mary Ann in Autumn was published November 12, 2010 by Harper/HarperCollins, continuing the series. It was reviewed by Joseph Salvatore in the New York Times Sunday Book Reviews on November 14. It was followed in January 2014 by The Days of Anna Madrigal, which Maupin said would be the final novel in the series.

== Personal life ==
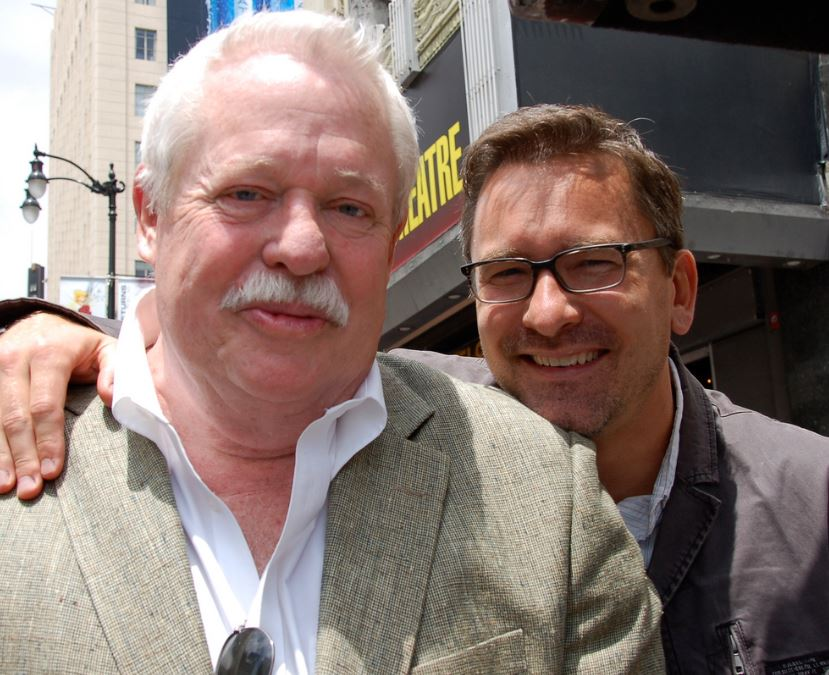
Maupin (left) with husband Christopher Turner in 2013.

Maupin has stated that he recognized his sexual orientation as gay from a young age, although he did not engage in sexual activity until he was 25, and decided to come out in 1974. For 12 years, he was in a relationship with Terry Anderson, a gay rights activist who co-authored the screenplay for The Night Listener. The couple lived together in both San Francisco and New Zealand.

After his breakup with Anderson, Maupin married Christopher Turner, a website producer and photographer, whom he met through a dating website. The couple was married in Vancouver, British Columbia, Canada, on February 18, 2007. In 2012, Maupin purchased a home in Tesuque, New Mexico, previously owned by shoe designers Lynne and Dennis Comeau. In 2019, Maupin and Turner relocated to London, settling in Clapham. In November 2023, Maupin became a British citizen.

Maupin's life and work are explored in the documentary The Untold Tales of Armistead Maupin. Early in his career, he was mentored by writer Christopher Isherwood, who had a significant influence on his writing. Maupin identifies as an atheist and is a cousin of the British singer Sarah Jane Morris, formerly of The Communards.

== Bibliography ==
=== Tales of the City ===
- Tales of the City. New York: Harper & Row. 1978. ISBN 0-06-090654-5.
- More Tales of the City. New York: Harper & Row. 1980. ISBN 0-06-090726-6.
- Further Tales of the City. New York: Harper & Row. 1982. ISBN 0-06-014991-4.
- Babycakes. New York: Harper & Row. 1984. ISBN 978-0-06-015262-8.
- Significant Others. New York: Harper & Row. 1987. ISBN 0-06-096408-1.
- Sure of You. New York: Harper & Row. 1989. ISBN 0-06-016164-7.
- Michael Tolliver Lives. New York: HarperCollins. 2007. ISBN 978-0-06-076135-6.
- Mary Ann in Autumn. New York: HarperCollins. 2010. ISBN 978-0-06-147088-2.
- The Days of Anna Madrigal. New York: HarperCollins. 2014. ISBN 978-0-06-219624-8.
- Mona of the Manor. New York: HarperCollins. 2024. ISBN 978-0-06-297359-7.

=== Other novels ===
- Maybe the Moon. New York: HarperCollins. 1992. ISBN 0-06-016552-9.
- The Night Listener. New York: HarperCollins. 2000. ISBN 0-06-017143-X.

=== Memoir ===
- Maupin, Armistead (2017). Logical Family: A Memoir. New York: HarperCollins. ISBN 9780062391223. OCLC 1004769227.

=== Compilations ===
- 28 Barbary Lane: The Tales of the City Books 1--3. New York: Harper Perennial. 2016. ISBN 978-0-06-249901-1. Contains Tales of the City, More Tales of the City, and Further Tales of the City.
- Back to Barbary Lane: The Tales of the City Books 4--6. New York: Harper Perennial. 2016. ISBN 978-0-06-256129-9. Contains Babycakes, Significant Others, and Sure of You.
- Goodbye Barbary Lane: The Tales of the City Books 7--9. New York: Harper Perennial. 2016. ISBN 978-0-06-256377-4. Contains Michael Tolliver Lives, Mary Ann in Autumn, and The Days of Anna Madrigal.

== Awards ==
- 2007, Barbary Coast Award, presented by Litquake Literary Festival, San Francisco
- 2006, Best Gay Read Award, presented by the Big Gay Read Literature Festival, in the UK
- 2001, Gay, Lesbian & Bisexual Book Award
- 1999, Capital Award, presented by GLAAD Media Awards
- 1997 Bill Whitehead Award for Lifetime Achievement (Publishing Triangle)
