= Significant Others (novel) =

1987 novel by Armistead Maupin

- US first edition cover
- Author: Armistead Maupin
- Audio read by: Cynthia Nixon
- Language: English
- Series: Tales of the City
- Genre: Novel
- Published: 1987
- Publisher: Harper & Row
- Publication place: United States
- Media type: Print
- Pages: 274
- ISBN: 0-06-096126-0
- Preceded by: Babycakes
- Followed by: Sure of You

Significant Others (1987) is the fifth book in the Tales of the City series by American novelist Armistead Maupin. It originally was serialized in the San Francisco Examiner.

== Plot ==
It is 1985, and much of the action is set in the Russian River area north of San Francisco. Here, successful businessmen from around the globe gather at Bohemian Grove for a three-week encampment of male bonding, while downriver from them, events at Wimminwood, a lesbian music and arts festival, threaten the relationship of DeDe Halcyon-Day and D'orothea Wilson.

Returning characters include Mary Ann Singleton, who is having difficulty balancing her commitment to her career as a local talk show hostess with her obligations as a wife to Brian and mother to Shawna, the child of her friend Connie, who entrusted the girl's care to Mary Ann on her deathbed; Michael Tolliver, the romantic gay man who has recently tested HIV-positive and is taking AZT to combat the threat to his immune system; and Anna Madrigal, the transgender landlady who mothers her tenants at 28 Barbary Lane on Russian Hill and is fighting to preserve the historic wooden steps of the lane.

New characters include Thack Sweeney, who meets Michael during a tour of Alcatraz and Wren Douglas, a plus-size model whose best-selling self-help book offers hope to overweight women. There is also a focus on a previously minor character, Roger "Booter" Manigault, DeDe's stepfather and a member of the Bohemian Club, who accidentally stumbles into Wimminwood and is held captive by one of its more militant organizers. Brian's college-aged nephew Jed also makes an appearance as a young Reaganite more interested in getting into Harvard Law School and making money than having fun.

== See also ==
- Teddy Bears' Picnic: a fictional film portrayal of the Bohemian Club
