= Charlotte Mailliard Shultz =

American socialite and philanthropist (1933–2021)

Charlotte Mailliard
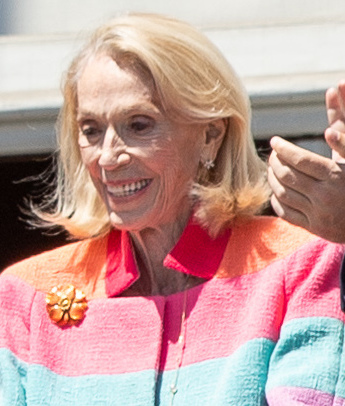
- Mailliard Shultz in 2021
- Born: Charlotte Smith; September 26, 1933; Borger, Texas, U.S.
- Died: December 3, 2021 (aged 88); Stanford, California, U.S.
- Education: University of Arkansas (BA)
- Political party: Democratic (before 1988); Republican (1988–2021)
- Spouses: John Mailliard (m. 1966; died 1986); Melvin Swig (m. 1988; died 1993); George Shultz (m. 1997; died 2021)

Charlotte Mailliard Shultz (née Smith; September 26, 1933 – December 3, 2021) was an American socialite and philanthropist. She was the Chief of Protocol for the state of California, and the Chief of Protocol for the City and County of San Francisco. She was married to former United States Secretary of State George Shultz, from 1997 until his death in 2021.

Mailliard Shultz was President of the board of the War Memorial Performing Arts Center and a member of the boards of the San Francisco Symphony, Grace Cathedral, the Commonwealth Club of California, and the San Francisco Ballet. A native Texan, Mailliard Shultz often quipped about San Francisco, "... if I don't pay my dues, they may send me back to Texas!"

== Early life and education ==
Born Charlotte Smith on September 26, 1933, in Borger, Texas, the daughter of Martha Morgan and Charles Samuel Smith, Jr., who ran the local general store. She graduated from the University of Arkansas with a degree in fashion design, marketing, and merchandising.

== Career ==
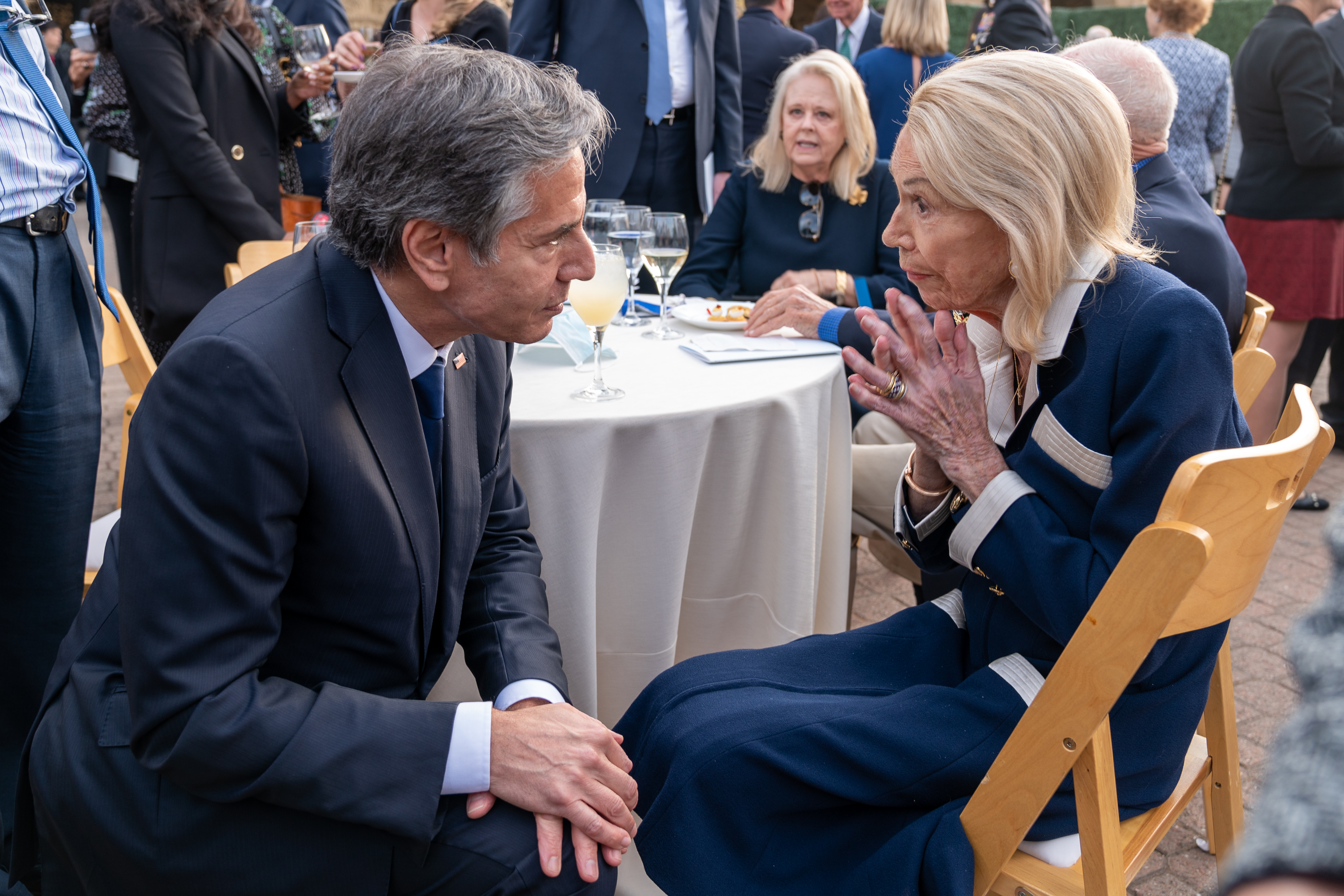
Shultz with Secretary of State Antony Blinken at a memorial reception for her husband, October 2021

In her role as Chief of Protocol for San Francisco, Mailliard oversaw the San Francisco Office of Protocol. Mailliard had been called the "city's premier party-giver" by the San Francisco Chronicle. Her role as Chief of Protocol began as a volunteer for then-San Francisco mayor Jack Shelley and spanned seven mayoral administrations until mayor Frank Jordan's term. Jordan chose Richard Goldman as his Chief of Protocol. Mayor Willie Brown re-appointed Mailliard to the post in 1996. In total, she served as Chief of Protocol for eight mayoral administrations and during that time brought back the city's Black and White Ball, organized the 50th anniversary of the Golden Gate Bridge with the Golden Gate Bridge Walk (where one million pedestrians walked across the bridge), and welcomed British royalty and Pope John Paul II on their visits to the city.

In 2003, in San Francisco, a surprise party was held to honor her work on behalf of the city. Baseball legend Willie Mays, incoming and outgoing mayors Willie Brown and Gavin Newsom, and Governor Arnold Schwarzenegger and his then-wife Maria Shriver were in attendance. It was announced that the staircase of San Francisco City Hall would be known as the Charlotte Mailliard Shultz Staircase.

In 2004, Governor Schwarzenegger appointed her as Chief of Protocol for the State of California.

== Personal life ==
After moving to San Francisco, Mailliard met her first husband, John Ward Mailliard III. They eloped on May 27, 1966 in Las Vegas. He died of cancer on August 14, 1986.

In 1988, she married Melvin Swig, owner of the Fairmont Hotel. As a couple, the Swigs donated and raised numerous funds for building the new San Francisco Public Library. Melvin Swig died in 1993.

Mailliard's marriage, at age 63, to former Secretary of State George Shultz, age 76, a widower, at Grace Cathedral in 1997, was considered San Francisco's "social event of the year". He gave her a diamond, sapphire and ruby engagement ring. The cost of the reception at the Sheraton Palace Hotel was over $4,000,000 and featured entertainment from singer Billy Joel. Guests included Nancy Reagan, California governor Pete Wilson, and U.S. Representative Nancy Pelosi.

The couple continued to be actively involved in San Francisco social events, such as hosting receptions at their Russian Hill penthouse on top of The Summit for a group of U.S. and foreign diplomats in 2015.

Mailliard Shultz died from cancer at her home in Stanford, California, on December 3, 2021, at the age of 88. Her husband, George, had died 10 months earlier at the age of 100. She was remembered by the San Francisco Examiner as someone who, "reigned as San Francisco’s chief of protocol for more than half a century."

== Honors ==
In 2007, she was named Honorary Commander of the Royal Victorian Order (CVO) by Queen Elizabeth II.
