= Golden Globe Award for Best Motion Picture – Musical or Comedy =

Award

- Awarded for: Best Musical or Comedy Picture
- Location: United States
- Presented by: Dick Clark Productions
- Currently held by: One Battle After Another (2025)
- Website: goldenglobes.com

The Golden Globe Award for Best Motion Picture – Musical or Comedy is a Golden Globe Award that has been awarded annually since 1952 by the Hollywood Foreign Press Association (HFPA).

== Eligibility ==
Eligible films must be at least 70 minutes in length, be commercially released for at least seven days in the "greater Los Angeles area", and screened for the HFPA membership. The commercial release must begin during the calendar year prior to the awards ceremony, and the screening can occur no later than one week after commercial release. For purposes of the award, a "musical" is "a comedy or a drama in which songs are used in addition to spoken dialogue to further the plot."

Under the 2007 revised rules of the HFPA, animated films were no longer eligible in this or the category of Golden Globe Award for Best Motion Picture – Drama, instead competing exclusively in the new category of Best Animated Feature Film; until 2023 prior of the now-defunct Hollywood Foreign Press Association, the rule is amended by Dick Clark Productions following controversies of splitting votes between the main categories, which animated films are still allowed to be eligible in this category or Drama as well as Animated at the same time in similar vein to Golden Globe Award for Best Foreign Language Film and newly established Cinematic and Box Office Achievement.

== Winners and nominations ==
=== 1951–1957 ===
Year	Film	Director	Producer
1951	An American in Paris	Vincente Minnelli	Arthur Freed
1952	With a Song in My Heart	Walter Lang	Lamar Trotti
1952	Hans Christian Andersen	Charles Vidor	Samuel Goldwyn
1952	I'll See You in My Dreams	Michael Curtiz	Louis F. Edelman
1952	Singin' in the Rain	Stanley Donen and Gene Kelly	Arthur Freed
1952	Stars and Stripes Forever	Henry Koster	Lamar Trotti
1953	No Award given.		
1954	Carmen Jones	Otto Preminger	Otto Preminger
1955	Guys and Dolls	Joseph L. Mankiewicz	Samuel Goldwyn
1956	The King and I	Walter Lang	Charles Brackett & Darryl F. Zanuck
1956	Bus Stop	Joshua Logan	Buddy Adler
1956	The Opposite Sex	David Miller	Joe Pasternak
1956	The Solid Gold Cadillac	Richard Quine	Fred Kohlmar
1956	The Teahouse of the August Moon	Daniel Mann	Jack Cummings
1957	Les Girls	George Cukor	Saul Chaplin & Sol C. Siegel
1957	Don't Go Near the Water	Charles Walters	Lawrence Weingarten
1957	Love in the Afternoon	Billy Wilder	
1957	Pal Joey	George Sidney	Fred Kohlmar
1957	Silk Stockings	Rouben Mamoulian	Arthur Freed

=== 1958–1962 ===
Year	Comedy	Director	Producer	Musical	Director	Producer
1958	Auntie Mame	Morton DaCosta	Morton DaCosta	Gigi	Vincente Minnelli	Arthur Freed
1958	Bell, Book and Candle	Richard Quine	Julian Blaustein	Damn Yankees	George Abbott & Stanley Donen	George Abbott, Stanley Donen, Robert E. Griffith, & Harold Prince
1958	Indiscreet	Stanley Donen	Norman Krasna	South Pacific	Joshua Logan	Buddy Adler
1958	Me and the Colonel	Peter Glenville	William Goetz	tom thumb	George Pal	George Pal
1958	The Perfect Furlough	Blake Edwards	Robert Arthur	tom thumb	George Pal	George Pal
1959	Some Like It Hot	Billy Wilder		Porgy and Bess	Otto Preminger	Samuel Goldwyn
1959	But Not for Me	Walter Lang	William Perlberg & George Seaton	The Five Pennies	Melville Shavelson	Jack Rose
1959	Operation Petticoat	Blake Edwards	Robert Arthur	Li'l Abner	Melvin Frank	Norman Panama
1959	Pillow Talk	Michael Gordon	Ross Hunter & Martin Melcher	A Private's Affair	Raoul Walsh	David Weisbart
1959	Who Was That Lady?	George Sidney	Norman Krasna	Say One for Me	Frank Tashlin	Frank Tashlin
1960	The Apartment	Billy Wilder		Song Without End	George Cukor & Charles Vidor	William Goetz
1960	The Facts of Life	Melvin Frank & Norman Panama	Melvin Frank & Norman Panama	Bells Are Ringing	Vincente Minnelli	Arthur Freed
1960	The Grass Is Greener	Stanley Donen	Stanley Donen & James H. Ware	Can-Can	Walter Lang	Saul Chaplin & Jack Cummings
1960	It Started in Naples	Melville Shavelson	Jack Rose	Let's Make Love	George Cukor	Jerry Wald
1960	Our Man in Havana	Carol Reed	Carol Reed	Pepe	George Sidney	
1961	A Majority of One	Mervyn LeRoy	Mervyn LeRoy	West Side Story	Jerome Robbins & Robert Wise	Robert Wise
1961	Breakfast at Tiffany's	Blake Edwards	Martin Jurow & Richard Shepherd	Babes in Toyland	Jack Donohue	Walt Disney
1961	One, Two, Three	Billy Wilder		Babes in Toyland	Jack Donohue	Walt Disney
1961	The Parent Trap	David Swift	Walt Disney & George Golitzen	Flower Drum Song	Henry Koster	Ross Hunter
1961	Pocketful of Miracles	Frank Capra		Flower Drum Song	Henry Koster	Ross Hunter
1962	That Touch of Mink	Delbert Mann	Robert Arthur, Martin Melcher, Edward Muhl, & Stanley Shapiro	The Music Man	Morton DaCosta	
1962	The Best of Enemies	Guy Hamilton	Dino De Laurentiis	Billy Rose's Jumbo	Charles Walters	Martin Melcher & Joe Pasternak
1962	Boys' Night Out	Michael Gordon	Martin Ransohoff	Girls! Girls! Girls!	Norman Taurog	Hal B. Wallis
1962	If a Man Answers	Henry Levin	Ross Hunter	Gypsy	Mervyn LeRoy	
1962	Period of Adjustment	George Roy Hill	Lawrence Weingarten	The Wonderful World of the Brothers Grimm	Henry Levin & George Pal	George Pal

=== 1963–1969 ===
Year	Film	Director	Producer
1963	Tom Jones	Tony Richardson	Michael Balcon, Michael Holden, Oscar Lewenstein, & Tony Richardson
1963	Bye Bye Birdie	George Sidney	Irving Brecher & Michael Stewart
1963	Irma la Douce	Billy Wilder	Edward L. Alperson, I.A.L. Diamond, Doane Harrison, Alexandre Trauner, & Billy Wilder
1963	It's a Mad, Mad, Mad, Mad World	Stanley Kramer	
1963	A Ticklish Affair	George Sidney	Joe Pasternak
1963	Under the Yum Yum Tree	David Swift	
1964	My Fair Lady	George Cukor	Jack L. Warner
1964	Father Goose	Ralph Nelson	Robert Arthur
1964	Mary Poppins	Robert Stevenson	Walt Disney & Bill Walsh
1964	The Unsinkable Molly Brown	Charles Walters	Lawrence Weingarten
1964	The World of Henry Orient	George Roy Hill	Jerome Hellman
1965	The Sound of Music	Robert Wise	
1965	Cat Ballou	Elliot Silverstein	Walter Newman
1965	The Great Race	Blake Edwards	Martin Jurow
1965	Those Magnificent Men in their Flying Machines	Ken Annakin	Stan Margulies
1965	A Thousand Clowns	Fred Coe	
1966	The Russians Are Coming, the Russians Are Coming	Norman Jewison	
1966	A Funny Thing Happened on the Way to the Forum	Richard Lester	Melvin Frank
1966	Gambit	Ronald Neame	Leo L. Fuchs
1966	Not with My Wife, You Don't!	Norman Panama	
1966	You're a Big Boy Now	Francis Ford Coppola	Phil Feldman
1967	The Graduate	Mike Nichols	Joseph E. Levine & Lawrence Turman
1967	Camelot	Joshua Logan	Jack Warner
1967	Doctor Dolittle	Richard Fleischer	Arthur P. Jacobs
1967	The Taming of the Shrew	Franco Zeffirelli	Richard McWhorter & Elizabeth Taylor
1967	Thoroughly Modern Millie	George Roy Hill	Ross Hunter
1968	Oliver!	Carol Reed	John Woolf
1968	Finian's Rainbow	Francis Ford Coppola	Joseph Landon
1968	Funny Girl	William Wyler	Ray Stark
1968	The Odd Couple	Gene Saks	Howard W. Koch
1968	Yours, Mine and Ours	Melville Shavelson	Robert F. Blumofe
1969	The Secret of Santa Vittoria	Stanley Kramer	George Glass & Stanley Kramer
1969	Cactus Flower	Gene Saks	M.J. Frankovich
1969	Goodbye, Columbus	Larry Peerce	Stanley R. Jaffe
1969	Hello, Dolly!	Gene Kelly	Ernest Lehman
1969	Paint Your Wagon	Joshua Logan	Alan Jay Lerner

=== 1970s ===
Year	Film	Director	Producer
1970	MASH	Robert Altman	Ingo Preminger
1970	Darling Lili	Blake Edwards	
1970	Diary of a Mad Housewife	Frank Perry	Frank Perry
1970	Lovers and Other Strangers	Cy Howard	David Susskind
1970	Scrooge	Ronald Neame	Robert H. Solo
1971	Fiddler on the Roof	Norman Jewison	
1971	The Boy Friend	Ken Russell	Harry Benn & Ken Russell
1971	Kotch	Jack Lemmon	Richard Carter
1971	A New Leaf	Elaine May	Hillard Elkins
1971	Plaza Suite	Arthur Hiller	Howard W. Koch
1972	Cabaret	Bob Fosse	Cy Feuer
1972	Avanti!	Billy Wilder	
1972	Butterflies Are Free	Milton Katselas	M.J. Frankovich
1972	1776	Peter H. Hunt	Jack Warner
1972	Travels with My Aunt	George Cukor	James Cresson & Robert Fryer
1973	American Graffiti	George Lucas	Francis Ford Coppola & Gary Kurtz
1973	Jesus Christ Superstar	Norman Jewison	Norman Jewison, Patrick Palmer, & Robert Stigwood
1973	Paper Moon	Peter Bogdanovich	Peter Bogdanovich & Frank Marshall
1973	Tom Sawyer	Don Taylor	Frank Capra Jr. & Arthur P. Jacobs
1973	A Touch of Class	Melvin Frank	
1974	The Longest Yard	Robert Aldrich	Albert S. Ruddy
1974	The Front Page	Billy Wilder	Paul Monash
1974	Harry and Tonto	Paul Mazursky	
1974	The Little Prince	Stanley Donen	
1974	The Three Musketeers	Richard Lester	Alexander Salkind, Ilya Salkind, & Pierre Spengler
1975	The Sunshine Boys	Herbert Ross	Ray Stark
1975	Funny Lady	Herbert Ross	Ray Stark
1975	The Return of the Pink Panther	Blake Edwards	
1975	Shampoo	Hal Ashby	Warren Beatty
1975	Tommy	Ken Russell	Ken Russell & Robert Stigwood
1976	A Star Is Born	Frank Pierson	Jon Peters
1976	Bugsy Malone	Alan Parker	Alan Marshall
1976	The Pink Panther Strikes Again	Blake Edwards	
1976	The Ritz	Richard Lester	Denis O'Dell
1976	Silent Movie	Mel Brooks	Michael Hertzberg
1977	The Goodbye Girl	Herbert Ross	Ray Stark
1977	Annie Hall	Woody Allen	Charles H. Joffe
1977	High Anxiety	Mel Brooks	
1977	New York, New York	Martin Scorsese	Robert Chartoff & Irwin Winkler
1977	Saturday Night Fever	John Badham	Robert Stigwood
1978	Heaven Can Wait	Warren Beatty & Buck Henry	Warren Beatty
1978	California Suite	Herbert Ross	Ray Stark
1978	Foul Play	Colin Higgins	Edward K. Milkins & Thomas L. Miller
1978	Grease	Randal Kleiser	Allan Carr & Robert Stigwood
1978	Movie Movie	Stanley Donen	
1979	Breaking Away	Peter Yates	Steve Tesich
1979	Being There	Hal Ashby	Andrew Braunsberg
1979	Hair	Miloš Forman	Michael Butler & Lester Persky
1979	The Rose	Mark Rydell	Anthony Ray, Aaron Russo, & Marvin Worth
1979	10	Blake Edwards	Tony Adams & Blake Edwards

=== 1980s ===
Year	Film	Director	Producer
1980	Coal Miner's Daughter	Michael Apted	Bernard Schwartz
1980	Airplane!	Jim Abrahams, David Zucker & Jerry Zucker	Jon Davison & Howard W. Koch
1980	Fame	Alan Parker	David De Silva & Alan Marshall
1980	The Idolmaker	Taylor Hackford	Gene Kirkwood & Howard W. Koch Jr.
1980	Melvin and Howard	Jonathan Demme	Art Linson & Don Phillips
1981	Arthur	Steve Gordon	Steve Gordon
1981	The Four Seasons	Alan Alda	Martin Bregman
1981	Pennies from Heaven	Herbert Ross	Nora Kaye, Rick McCallum, & Herbert Ross
1981	S.O.B.	Blake Edwards	Tony Adams & Blake Edwards
1981	Zoot Suit	Luis Valdez	Peter Burrell
1982	Tootsie	Sydney Pollack	Sydney Pollack & Dick Richards
1982	The Best Little Whorehouse in Texas	Colin Higgins	Robert L. Boyett & Colin Higgins
1982	Diner	Barry Levinson	Jerry Weintraub
1982	My Favorite Year	Richard Benjamin	Michael Gruskoff
1982	Victor Victoria	Blake Edwards	Tony Adams & Blake Edwards
1983	Yentl	Barbra Streisand	Larry DeWaay, Rusty Lemorande, & Barbra Streisand
1983	The Big Chill	Lawrence Kasdan	Michael Shamberg
1983	Flashdance	Adrian Lyne	Jerry Bruckheimer & Don Simpson
1983	Trading Places	John Landis	George Folsey Jr., Aaron Russo, Irwin Russo, & Sam Williams
1983	Zelig	Woody Allen	Robert Greenhut
1984	Romancing the Stone	Robert Zemeckis	Michael Douglas
1984	Beverly Hills Cop	Martin Brest	Jerry Bruckheimer & Don Simpson
1984	Ghostbusters	Ivan Reitman	Bernie Brillstein & Ivan Reitman
1984	Micki & Maude	Blake Edwards	Tony Adams, Lou Antonio, Trish Caroselli, & Jonathan D. Krane
1984	Splash	Ron Howard	Brian Grazer
1985	Prizzi's Honor	John Huston	John Foreman
1985	Back to the Future	Robert Zemeckis	Neil Canton & Bob Gale
1985	A Chorus Line	Richard Attenborough	Cy Feuer
1985	Cocoon	Ron Howard	David Brown & Richard D. Zanuck
1985	The Purple Rose of Cairo	Woody Allen	Robert Greenhut
1986	Hannah and Her Sisters	Woody Allen	Robert Greenhut
1986	Crimes of the Heart	Bruce Beresford	Freddie Fields
1986	Crocodile Dundee	Peter Faiman	John Cornell
1986	Down and Out in Beverly Hills	Paul Mazursky	Pato Guzman & Paul Mazursky
1986	Little Shop of Horrors	Frank Oz	David Geffen
1986	Peggy Sue Got Married	Francis Ford Coppola	Paul R. Gurian
1987	Hope and Glory	John Boorman	John Boorman & Michael Dryhurst
1987	Baby Boom	Charles Shyer	Bruce A. Block & Nancy Meyers
1987	Broadcast News	James L. Brooks	James L. Brooks
1987	Dirty Dancing	Emile Ardolino	Linda Gottlieb
1987	Moonstruck	Norman Jewison	
1988	Working Girl	Mike Nichols	Douglas Wick
1988	Big	Penny Marshall	James L. Brooks & Robert Greenhut
1988	A Fish Called Wanda	Charles Crichton	Michael Shamberg
1988	Midnight Run	Martin Brest	
1988	Who Framed Roger Rabbit	Robert Zemeckis	Frank Marshall & Robert Watts
1989	Driving Miss Daisy	Bruce Beresford	Lili Fini Zanuck & Richard D. Zanuck
1989	The Little Mermaid	Ron Clements & John Musker	Howard Ashman & John Musker
1989	Shirley Valentine	Lewis Gilbert	
1989	The War of the Roses	Danny DeVito	James L. Brooks & Arnon Milchan
1989	When Harry Met Sally...	Rob Reiner	Rob Reiner & Andrew Scheinman

=== 1990s ===
Year	Film	Director	Producer
1990	Green Card	Peter Weir	
1990	Dick Tracy	Warren Beatty	
1990	Ghost	Jerry Zucker	Steven-Charles Jaffe, Lauren Ray, & Bruce Joel Rubin
1990	Home Alone	Chris Columbus	John Hughes
1990	Pretty Woman	Garry Marshall	Laura Ziskin
1991	Beauty and the Beast	Gary Trousdale & Kirk Wise	Don Hahn
1991	City Slickers	Ron Underwood	Billy Crystal & Irby Smith
1991	The Commitments	Alan Parker	Lynda Myles & Roger Randall-Cutler
1991	The Fisher King	Terry Gilliam	Debra Hill, Tony Mark, & Lynda Obst
1991	Fried Green Tomatoes	Jon Avnet	Jon Avnet & Norman Lear
1992	The Player	Robert Altman	David Brown, Michael Tolkin, & Nick Wechsler
1992	Aladdin	Ron Clements & John Musker	Ron Clements & John Musker
1992	Enchanted April	Mike Newell	Matthew Hamilton, Simon Relph, Ann Scott, & Mark Shivas
1992	Honeymoon in Vegas	Andrew Bergman	Mike Lobell
1992	Sister Act	Emile Ardolino	Scott Rudin & Teri Schwartz
1993	Mrs. Doubtfire	Chris Columbus	Marsha Garces, Robin Williams & Mark Radcliffe
1993	Dave	Ivan Reitman	Ivan Reitman & Lauren Shuler Donner
1993	Much Ado About Nothing	Kenneth Branagh	Kenneth Branagh, Stephen Evans, & David Parfitt
1993	Sleepless in Seattle	Nora Ephron	Gary Foster
1993	Strictly Ballroom	Baz Luhrmann	Antoinette Albert & Tristram Miall
1994	The Lion King	Roger Allers & Rob Minkoff	Don Hahn
1994	The Adventures of Priscilla, Queen of the Desert	Stephan Elliott	Al Clark & Michael Hamlyn
1994	Ed Wood	Tim Burton	Tim Burton & Denise Di Novi
1994	Four Weddings and a Funeral	Mike Newell	Duncan Kenworthy
1994	Prêt-à-Porter	Robert Altman	Robert Altman & Scott Bushnell
1995	Babe	Chris Noonan	Catherine Barber, Philip Hearnshaw, Bill Miller, George Miller, Doug Mitchell, & Daphne Paris
1995	The American President	Rob Reiner	Barbara Maltby, Charles Newirth, Rob Reiner, & Jeffrey Stott
1995	Get Shorty	Barry Sonnenfeld	Danny DeVito, Michael Shamberg, & Stacey Sher
1995	Sabrina	Sydney Pollack	Sydney Pollack & Scott Rudin
1995	Toy Story	John Lasseter	Bonnie Arnold & Ralph Guggenheim
1996	Evita	Alan Parker	Alan Parker & Robert Stigwood
1996	The Birdcage	Mike Nichols	Marcello Danon, Michele Imperato, Neal Machlis, & Mike Nichols
1996	Everyone Says I Love You	Woody Allen	Robert Greenhut
1996	Fargo	Joel Coen	Ethan Coen
1996	Jerry Maguire	Cameron Crowe	James L. Brooks, Cameron Crowe, Laurence Mark, & Richard Sakai
1997	As Good as It Gets	James L. Brooks	James L. Brooks, Bridget Johnson, & Kristi Zea
1997	The Full Monty	Peter Cattaneo	Uberto Pasolini
1997	Men in Black	Barry Sonnenfeld	Laurie MacDonald, Walter F. Parkes, & Steven Spielberg
1997	My Best Friend's Wedding	P. J. Hogan	Jerry Zucker, Ronald Bass, Gil Netter, & Patricia Whitcher
1997	Wag the Dog	Barry Levinson	Barry Levinson & Robert De Niro
1998	Shakespeare in Love	John Madden	Donna Gigliotti, Marc Norman, David Parfitt, Harvey Weinstein, & Edward Zwick
1998	Bulworth	Warren Beatty	Warren Beatty & Pieter Jan Brugge
1998	The Mask of Zorro	Martin Campbell	Doug Claybourne & David Foster
1998	Patch Adams	Tom Shadyac	Mike Farrell, Barry Kemp, Marvin Minoff, & Charles Newirth
1998	Still Crazy	Brian Gibson	Amanda Marmot
1998	There's Something About Mary	Bobby Farrelly & Peter Farrelly	Frank Beddor, Michael Steinberg, Bradley Thomas & Charles B. Wessler
1999	Toy Story 2	John Lasseter	Karen Robert Jackson & Helene Plotkin
1999	Analyze This	Harold Ramis	Jane Rosenthal & Paula Weinstein
1999	Being John Malkovich	Spike Jonze	Steve Golin, Vincent Landay, Sandy Stern, & Michael Stipe
1999	Man on the Moon	Miloš Forman	Danny DeVito
1999	Notting Hill	Roger Michell	Duncan Kenworthy

=== 2000s ===
Year	Film	Director	Producer
2000	Almost Famous	Cameron Crowe	Ian Bryce & Cameron Crowe
2000	Best in Show	Christopher Guest	Gordon Mark & Karen Murphy
2000	Chicken Run	Peter Lord & Nick Park	Peter Lord, Nick Park, & David Sproxton
2000	Chocolat	Lasse Hallström	Harvey Weinstein
2000	O Brother, Where Art Thou?	Joel Coen	Tim Bevan, Ethan Coen, & Eric Fellner
2001	Moulin Rouge!	Baz Luhrmann	Fred Baron, Martin Brown, & Baz Luhrmann
2001	Bridget Jones's Diary	Sharon Maguire	Tim Bevan, Jonathan Cavendish, & Eric Fellner
2001	Gosford Park	Robert Altman	Robert Altman, Bob Balaban, & David Levy
2001	Legally Blonde	Robert Luketic	Ric Kidney & Marc E. Platt
2001	Shrek	Andrew Adamson & Vicky Jenson	Jeffrey Katzenberg, Aron Warner, & John H. Williams
2002	Chicago	Rob Marshall	Meryl Poster, Martin Richards, Bob Weinstein, Harvey Weinstein, & Craig Zadan
2002	About a Boy	Chris Weitz & Paul Weitz	Tim Bevan, Robert De Niro, Brad Epstein, Eric Fellner, & Jane Rosenthal
2002	Adaptation.	Spike Jonze	Jonathan Demme, Vincent Landay, & Edward Saxon
2002	My Big Fat Greek Wedding	Joel Zwick	Gary Goetzman, Tom Hanks, & Rita Wilson
2002	Nicholas Nickleby	Douglas McGrath	Simon Channing-Williams, John Hart, & Jeffrey Sharp
2003	Lost in Translation	Sofia Coppola	Sofia Coppola & Ross Katz
2003	Bend It Like Beckham	Gurinder Chadha	Gurinder Chadha & Deepak Nayar
2003	Big Fish	Tim Burton	Bruce Cohen, Dan Jinks, & Richard D. Zanuck
2003	Finding Nemo	Andrew Stanton	Graham Walters
2003	Love Actually	Richard Curtis	Tim Bevan, Eric Fellner, & Duncan Kenworthy
2004	Sideways	Alexander Payne	Michael London
2004	Eternal Sunshine of the Spotless Mind	Michel Gondry	Anthony Bregman & Steve Golin
2004	The Incredibles	Brad Bird	John Walker
2004	The Phantom of the Opera	Joel Schumacher	Andrew Lloyd Webber
2004	Ray	Taylor Hackford	Howard Baldwin, Karen Baldwin, Stuart Benjamin, & Taylor Hackford
2005	Walk the Line	James Mangold	James Keach & Cathy Konrad
2005	Mrs Henderson Presents	Stephen Frears	Norma Heyman
2005	Pride & Prejudice	Joe Wright	Tim Bevan, Eric Fellner, & Paul Webster
2005	The Producers	Susan Stroman	Mel Brooks
2005	The Squid and the Whale	Noah Baumbach	Wes Anderson
2006	Dreamgirls	Bill Condon	Laurence Mark
2006	Borat: Cultural Learnings of America for Make Benefit Glorious Nation of Kazakhstan	Larry Charles	Sacha Baron Cohen & Jay Roach
2006	The Devil Wears Prada	David Frankel	Wendy Finerman & Karen Rosenfelt
2006	Little Miss Sunshine	Jonathan Dayton and Valerie Faris	Albert Berger, David T. Friendly, Peter Saraf, Marc Turtletaub, & Ron Yerxa
2006	Thank You for Smoking	Jason Reitman	Edward R. Pressman & David O. Sacks
2007	Sweeney Todd: The Demon Barber of Fleet Street	Tim Burton	John Logan, Laurie MacDonald, Walter F. Parkes, & Richard D. Zanuck
2007	Across the Universe	Julie Taymor	Charles Newirth, Jennifer Todd, & Suzanne Todd
2007	Charlie Wilson's War	Mike Nichols	Tom Hanks
2007	Hairspray	Adam Shankman	Toby Emmerich, Neil Meron, Marc Shaiman, Adam Shankman, Bob Shaye, Scott Wittman, & Craig Zadan
2007	Juno	Jason Reitman	Lianne Halfon, John Malkovich, Mason Novick, & Russell Smith
2008	Vicky Cristina Barcelona	Woody Allen	Letty Aronson, Jaume Roures, Stephen Tenenbaum, & Gareth Wiley
2008	Burn After Reading	Joel Coen and Ethan Coen	Joel Coen and Ethan Coen
2008	Happy-Go-Lucky	Mike Leigh	Simon Channing-Williams
2008	In Bruges	Martin McDonagh	Graham Broadbent & Peter Czernin
2008	Mamma Mia!	Phyllida Lloyd	Benny Andersson, Judy Craymer, Tom Hanks, Phyllida Lloyd, Björn Ulvaeus, & Rita Wilson
2009	The Hangover	Todd Phillips	Daniel Goldberg & Todd Phillips
2009	(500) Days of Summer	Marc Webb	Mason Novick, Jessica Tuchinsky, Mark Waters, & Steven J. Wolfe
2009	It's Complicated	Nancy Meyers	Nancy Meyers & Scott Rudin
2009	Julie & Julia	Nora Ephron	Nora Ephron, Laurence Mark, Amy Robinson, & Eric Steel
2009	Nine	Rob Marshall	John DeLuca, Rob Marshall, Marc Platt, Harvey Weinstein, & Maury Yeston

=== 2010s ===
Year	Film	Director	Producer
2010	The Kids Are All Right	Lisa Cholodenko	Gary Gilbert, Jeff Levy-Hinte, Celine Rattray
2010	Alice in Wonderland	Tim Burton	Richard D. Zanuck, Joe Roth, Suzanne Todd, and Jennifer Todd
2010	Burlesque	Steven Antin	Donald De Line
2010	Red	Robert Schwentke	Lorenzo di Bonaventura and Mark Vahradian
2010	The Tourist	Florian Henckel von Donnersmarck	Graham King, Timothy Headington, Roger Birnbaum, Gary Barber, and Jonathan Glickman
2011	The Artist	Michel Hazanavicius	Thomas Langmann
2011	50/50	Jonathan Levine	Evan Goldberg, Ben Karlin, and Seth Rogen
2011	Bridesmaids	Paul Feig	Judd Apatow, Barry Mendel, and Clayton Townsend
2011	Midnight in Paris	Woody Allen	Letty Aronson and Stephen Tenenbaum
2011	My Week with Marilyn	Simon Curtis	David Parfitt and Harvey Weinstein
2012	Les Misérables	Tom Hooper	Tim Bevan, Eric Fellner, Debra Hayward, and Cameron Mackintosh
2012	The Best Exotic Marigold Hotel	John Madden	Graham Broadbent and Peter Czernin
2012	Moonrise Kingdom	Wes Anderson	Jeremy Dawson, Scott Rudin, Wes Anderson, and Steven Rales
2012	Salmon Fishing in the Yemen	Lasse Hallström	Paul Webster
2012	Silver Linings Playbook	David O. Russell	Bruce Cohen, Donna Gigliotti, Jonathan Gordon
2013	American Hustle	David O. Russell	Charles Roven, Megan Ellison, Richard Suckle, and Jonathan Gordon
2013	Her	Spike Jonze	Megan Ellison, Spike Jonze, and Vincent Landay
2013	Inside Llewyn Davis	Joel Coen and Ethan Coen	Scott Rudin, Joel Coen, and Ethan Coen
2013	Nebraska	Alexander Payne	Albert Berger and Ron Yerxa
2013	The Wolf of Wall Street	Martin Scorsese	Martin Scorsese, Leonardo DiCaprio, Emma Tillinger Koskoff, and Joey McFarland
2014	The Grand Budapest Hotel	Wes Anderson	Wes Anderson, Jeremy Dawson, Steven Rales, and Scott Rudin
2014	Birdman	Alejandro G. Iñárritu	Alejandro G. Iñárritu, John Lesher and James W. Skotchdopole
2014	Into the Woods	Rob Marshall	Rob Marshall, John DeLuca, Marc Platt, and Callum McDougall
2014	Pride	Matthew Warchus	David Livingstone
2014	St. Vincent	Theodore Melfi	Fred Roos, Jenno Topping, Peter Chernin, and Theodore Melfi
2015	The Martian	Ridley Scott	Simon Kinberg, Ridley Scott, Michael Schaefer and Mark Huffam
2015	The Big Short	Adam McKay	Brad Pitt, Dede Gardner, and Jeremy Kleiner
2015	Joy	David O. Russell	John Davis, Megan Ellison, Jonathan Gordon, Ken Mok, and David O. Russell
2015	Spy	Paul Feig	Peter Chernin, Jenno Topping, Paul Feig, and Jessie Henderson
2015	Trainwreck	Judd Apatow	Judd Apatow and Barry Mendel
2016	La La Land	Damien Chazelle	Fred Berger, Jordan Horowitz, and Marc Platt
2016	20th Century Women	Mike Mills	Anne Carey, Megan Ellison, and Youree Henley
2016	Deadpool	Tim Miller	Simon Kinberg, Ryan Reynolds, and Lauren Shuler Donner
2016	Florence Foster Jenkins	Stephen Frears	Michael Kuhn and Tracey Seaward
2016	Sing Street	John Carney	Anthony Bregman, John Carney, Kevin Scott Frakes, Christian Grass, Martina Niland, Raj Brinder Singh, and Paul Trijbits
2017	Lady Bird	Greta Gerwig	Scott Rudin, Evelyn O'Neil, and Eli Bush
2017	The Disaster Artist	James Franco	James Franco, Vince Jolivette, Seth Rogen, Evan Goldberg, and James Weaver
2017	Get Out	Jordan Peele	Jordan Peele, Jason Blum, Sean McKittrick, and Edward H. Hamm Jr.
2017	The Greatest Showman	Michael Gracey	Laurence Mark, Peter Chernin, and Jenno Topping
2017	I, Tonya	Craig Gillespie	Margot Robbie, Tom Ackerley, Steven Rogers, and Bryan Unkeless
2018	Green Book	Peter Farrelly	Jim Burke, Charles B. Wessler, Brian Hayes Currie, Peter Farrelly, and Nick Vallelonga
2018	Crazy Rich Asians	Jon M. Chu	Nina Jacobson, Brad Simpson, and John Penotti
2018	The Favourite	Yorgos Lanthimos	Ceci Dempsey, Ed Guiney, Lee Magiday, and Yorgos Lanthimos
2018	Mary Poppins Returns	Rob Marshall	Rob Marshall, John DeLuca, and Marc Platt
2018	Vice	Adam McKay	Dede Gardner, Jeremy Kleiner, Adam McKay, Kevin Messick
2019	Once Upon a Time in Hollywood	Quentin Tarantino	David Heyman, Shannon McIntosh and Quentin Tarantino
2019	Dolemite Is My Name	Craig Brewer	Eddie Murphy, John Davis and John Fox
2019	Jojo Rabbit	Taika Waititi	Carthew Neal, Taika Waititi
2019	Knives Out	Rian Johnson	Ram Bergman and Rian Johnson
2019	Rocketman	Dexter Fletcher	Adam Bohling, David Furnish, David Reid and Matthew Vaughn

=== 2020s ===
Year	Film	Director	Producer
2020	Borat Subsequent Moviefilm: Delivery of Prodigious Bribe to American Regime for Make Benefit Once Glorious Nation of Kazakhstan	Jason Woliner	Sacha Baron Cohen, Monica Levinson, Anthony Hines
2020	Hamilton	Thomas Kail	Thomas Kail, Lin-Manuel Miranda, Jeffrey Seller
2020	Music	Sia	Sia, Vincent Landay
2020	Palm Springs	Max Barbakow	Chris Parker, Andy Samberg, Akiva Schaffer, Dylan Sellers, Becky Sloviter, Jorma Taccone
2020	The Prom	Ryan Murphy	Ryan Murphy, Alexis Martin Woodall, Adam Anders, Dori Berenstein, Bill Damaschke
2021	West Side Story	Steven Spielberg	Steven Spielberg, Kristie Macosko Krieger
2021	Cyrano	Joe Wright	Tim Bevan, Eric Fellner, Guy Heeley
2021	Don't Look Up	Adam McKay	Adam McKay, Kevin Messick
2021	Licorice Pizza	Paul Thomas Anderson	Sara Murphy, Adam Somner, Paul Thomas Anderson
2021	tick, tick... BOOM!	Lin-Manuel Miranda	Julie Oh, Lin-Manuel Miranda
2022	The Banshees of Inisherin	Martin McDonagh	Graham Broadbent, Peter Czernin, Martin McDonagh
2022	Babylon	Damien Chazelle	Marc Platt, Matthew Plouffe, Olivia Hamilton
2022	Everything Everywhere All at Once	Daniel Kwan and Daniel Scheinert	Daniel Kwan, Daniel Scheinert, Jonathan Wang
2022	Glass Onion: A Knives Out Mystery	Rian Johnson	Ram Bergman, Rian Johnson
2022	Triangle of Sadness	Ruben Östlund	Erik Hemmendorff, Philippe Bober
2023	Poor Things	Yorgos Lanthimos	Emma Stone, Ed Guiney, Yorgos Lanthimos, Andrew Lowe
2023	Air	Ben Affleck	David Ellison, Jesse Sisgold, Jon Weinbach, Ben Affleck, Matt Damon, Madison Ainley, Jeff Robinov, Peter Guber, Jason Michael Berman
2023	American Fiction	Cord Jefferson	Ben LeClair, Nikos Karamigios, Cord Jefferson, Jermaine Johnson
2023	Barbie	Greta Gerwig	Margot Robbie, Robbie Brenner, Tom Ackerley, David Heyman
2023	The Holdovers	Alexander Payne	Mark Johnson
2023	May December	Todd Haynes	Natalie Portman, Sophie Mas, Christine Vachon, Pamela Koffler, Grant S. Johnson, Tyler W. Konney, Jessica Elbaum, Will Ferrell
2024	Emilia Pérez	Jacques Audiard	Jacques Audiard, Pascal Caucheteux
2024	A Real Pain	Jesse Eisenberg	Jesse Eisenberg, Ali Herting
2024	Anora	Sean Baker	Alex Coco, Samantha Quan & Sean Baker
2024	Challengers	Luca Guadagnino	Amy Pascal, Luca Guadagnino, Zendaya & Rachel O’Connor
2024	The Substance	Coralie Fargeat	Coralie Fargeat, Tim Bevan & Eric Fellner
2024	Wicked	Jon M. Chu	Marc Platt
2025	One Battle After Another	Paul Thomas Anderson	Adam Somner, Sara Murphy & Paul Thomas Anderson
2025	Blue Moon	Richard Linklater	Mike Blizzard, John Sloss & Richard Linklater
2025	Bugonia	Yorgos Lanthimos	Ed Guiney, Andrew Lowe, Yorgos Lanthimos, Emma Stone, Lars Knudsen
2025	Marty Supreme	Josh Safdie	Josh Safdie, Ronald Bronstein, Eli Bush, Anthony Katagas & Timothée Chalamet
2025	No Other Choice	Park Chan-wook	Park Chan-wook, Back Jisun, Michèle Ray-Gavras & Alexandre Gavras
2025	Nouvelle Vague	Richard Linklater	Michèle Pétin & Laurent Pétin

== Notes and trivia ==
- Between 1989 and 2004, ten animated feature films were nominated for this award and three won:
1. 1989 - The Little Mermaid (lost to Driving Miss Daisy)
2. 1991 - Beauty and the Beast (won)
3. 1992 - Aladdin (lost to The Player)
4. 1994 - The Lion King (won)
5. 1995 - Toy Story (lost to Babe)
6. 1999 - Toy Story 2 (won)
7. 2000 - Chicken Run (lost to Almost Famous)
8. 2001 - Shrek (lost to Moulin Rouge!)
9. 2003 - Finding Nemo (lost to Lost in Translation)
10. 2004 - The Incredibles (lost to Sideways)
- Toy Story 2 and Borat Subsequent Moviefilm are the only sequels to have won this award without their respective nominated predecessors also winning.
- The 1961 and 2021 versions of West Side Story are the only films adapted from the same source material to win this award.
- Since 2023, Emilia Pérez is the first non-English-language film to win in that category.

== See also ==
- Academy Award for Best Picture
- BAFTA Award for Best Film
- Critics' Choice Movie Award for Best Picture
- Critics' Choice Movie Award for Best Comedy
- Golden Globe Award for Best Motion Picture – Drama
- Producers Guild of America Award for Best Theatrical Motion Picture
- Screen Actors Guild Award for Outstanding Performance by a Cast in a Motion Picture
