= The Night Listener =

The Night Listener may refer to

- The Night Listener (novel), a novel by Armistead Maupin
- The Night Listener (film), a 2006 film starring Robin Williams and Toni Collette, based on the novel
