= Nighthawks (2019 film) =

2019 American film directed by Grant S. Johnson

- Film poster
- Directed by: Grant S. Johnson
- Written by: Grant S. Johnson
- Produced by: Grant S. Johnson; John Hart; Jeffrey Sharp; Peter Pastorelli
- Starring: Chace Crawford; Kevin Zegers; Janet Montgomery
- Cinematography: Alexander Chinnici
- Edited by: Charlie Porter
- Music by: Kiley Norton
- Distributed by: FilmRise
- Release date: May 4, 2019
- Running time: 90 minutes
- Country: United States
- Language: English

Nighthawks is a 2019 American thriller film written, directed, and produced by Grant S. Johnson, which had its premiere in May 2019. The film stars Chace Crawford, Kevin Zegers and Janet Montgomery.

== Synopsis ==
Wide-eyed Midwest transplant Stan (Chace Crawford) agrees to play wingman to his calculating and privileged roommate Chad (Kevin Zegers) as they embark upon an exploration of glittering New York nightlife, whose darkest secrets are held captive by an elite band of millennials known as Nighthawks.

== Cast ==
- Chace Crawford as Stan
- Kevin Zegers as Chad
- Janet Montgomery as Marguerite
- Blue Kimble as Kentavious
- Lola Bessis as Maxime
- Michele Weaver as Alison
- Juliette Labelle as Caroline
- Tyler Weaks as Oliver
- Ping Hue as Soo
- Radio Man as Homeless man

== Release ==
The film premiered in a private screening on May 4, 2019, in New York. The film also played at the Montana International Film Festival.

The film was released through online platforms on October 3, 2019.
