= Grant S. Johnson =

Film director writer and producer

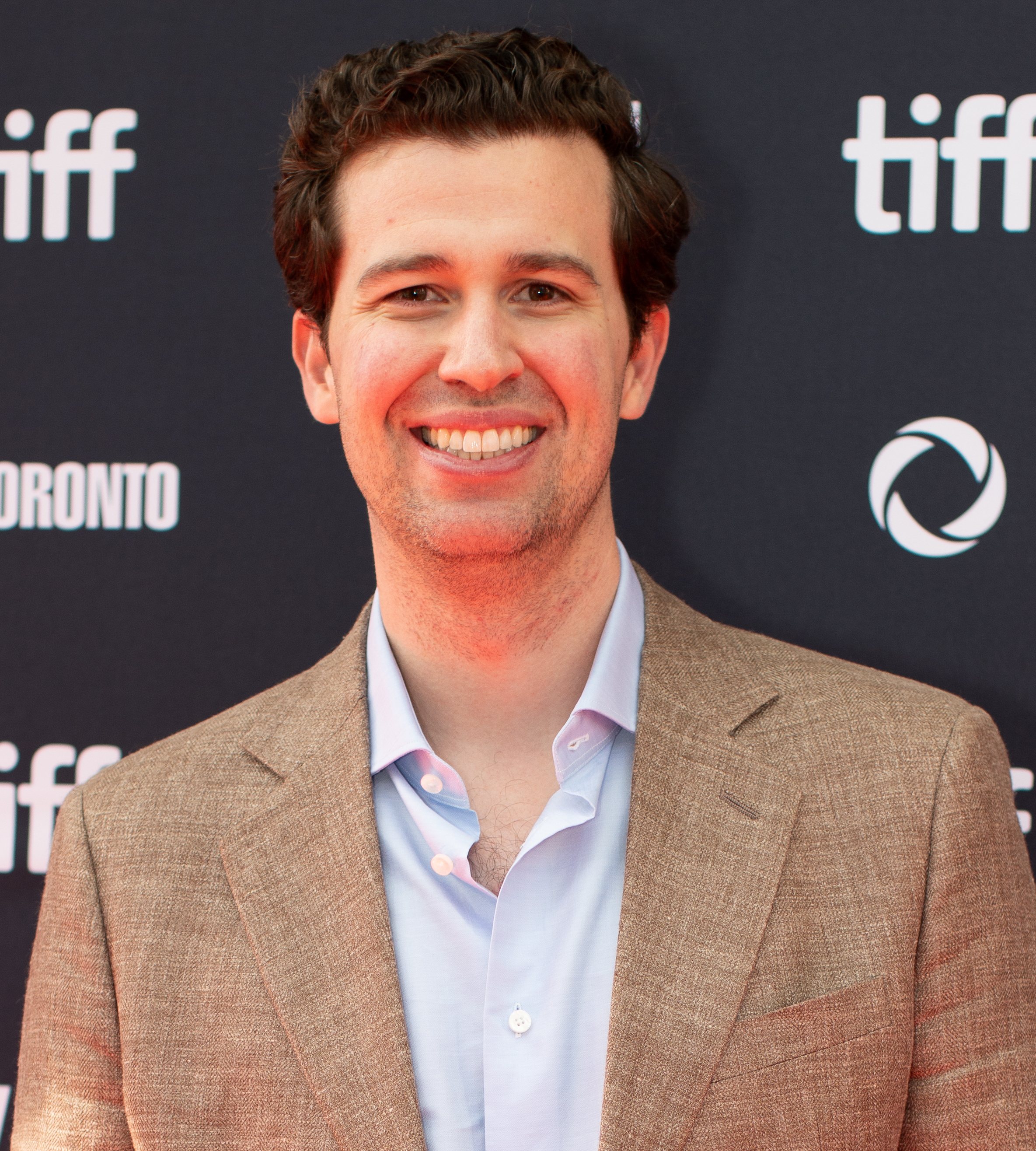
Johnson in 2024

Grant S. Johnson is a US American film director and producer. His theater credits include A Bronx Tale and The Band's Visit. The Band's Visit won 10 of its 11 nominations at the 72nd Tony Awards on June 10, 2018, including the Tony Award for Best Musical.

Johnson's film debut was Frat Star, which he wrote, directed, and produced. Hunter Ryan (Other People) also produced. Frat Star was released by Gravitas Ventures in 2017 on many platforms including Netflix, iTunes, Amazon Video, Vudu, YouTube, Verizon Fios, DirecTV, and Cox. As of January 14, 2017, the film had received 5 out of 5 stars on iTunes with 55 ratings. The poster artwork for Frat Star won the Silver Medal from the Society of Illustrators.

Johnson's second film, Nighthawks, was released domestically on October 3, 2019, which he also wrote, directed, and produced. The film had a Special Screening at the Tribeca Film Festival on May 4, 2019. The film also screened at the Montana International Film Festival on September 21, 2019. The film had its first international release in fifty countries in March 2020. The producers are John Hart (Boys Don't Cry, Revolutionary Road), Jeffrey Sharp (You Can Count on Me, Nicholas Nickleby), and Peter Pastorelli (Beasts of No Nation, 5 to 7, When We First Met). The film stars Chace Crawford (Gossip Girl), Kevin Zegers (Transamerica), and Janet Montgomery (Black Swan). The film is being distributed domestically by FilmRise (The Miseducation of Cameron Post) and internationally by Taylor and Dodge (The Escort).

Agent Game is Johnson's third feature, starring Dermot Mulroney, Adan Canto, Katie Cassidy, Annie Ilonzeh, Rhys Coiro, Barkhad Abdi, with Jason Isaacs, and Mel Gibson.

Johnson graduated from Swarthmore College in 2014 where he pitched for the varsity baseball team.

== Films ==
- 100 Nights of Hero - 2025 - Producer
- The Assessment - 2024 - Producer
- Summer Camp - 2024 - Executive Producer
- May December - 2023 - Producer
- Agent Game - 2022 - Director
- Nighthawks - 2019 - Writer, Director, Producer
- Frat Star - 2017 - Writer, Director, Producer

== Theater ==
- The Band's Visit - 2017
- A Bronx Tale - 2016
