= Emma E. Hickox =

British film editor

- Born: 11 April 1964 (age 62); London, England, UK
- Occupation: Film editor
- Parents: Douglas Hickox (father); Anne V. Coates (mother)
- Relatives: Anthony Hickox (brother); John Coates (uncle)

Emma E. Hickox A.C.E (born 11 April 1964) is a British film editor based in Los Angeles and London.

A member of American Cinema Editors, Hickox has worked as a features and television editor since the early 1990s. She has a varied resume from comedies, dramas and musicals, including Hollywood films such as Bad Moms featuring Mila Kunis, Rock of Ages featuring Tom Cruise, and smaller independent films such as Becoming Jane with Anne Hathaway and The Boat That Rocked from Richard Curtis with Philip Seymour Hoffman.

She is a founding member of the British Independent Film Awards where the Debut Director’s Award is presented in her father's name, the Douglas Hickox Award. She is the daughter of Academy Award-winning film editor Anne V. Coates, and Douglas Hickox (died 1988), a cult British film director who died in 1988. John Coates, her uncle, was a film and TV producer for Yellow Submarine and The Snowman.

== Filmography ==
Year	Title	Role	Director	Notes
1988	Baja Oklahoma	Apprentice editor	Bobby Roth	TV movie
1989	Disorganized Crime	Assistant film editor	Jim Kouf	
1989	Sundown: The Vampire in Retreat	First assistant editor	Anthony Hickox	
1990	Bird on a Wire	Assistant editor	John Badham	
1991	The Hard Way	Assistant editor	John Badham	
1991	Pretty Hattie's Baby	Assistant editor	Ivan Passer	
1992	Miracle Beach	Editor	Skott Snider	
1993	Mr. Jones	First assistant editor	Mike Figgis	
1994	The Crew	Editor	Carl Colpaert	
1995	How to Make an American Quilt	Additional editor	Jocelyn Moorhouse	
1995	French Exit	Supervising editor	Daphna Kastner	
1996	Dead Girl	Editor	Adam Coleman Howard	
1997	This World, Then the Fireworks	Editor	Michael Oblowitz	
1998	The Brylcreem Boys	Editor	Terence Ryan	
2001	Tangled	Editor	Jay Lowi	
2001	The Breed	Editor	Michael Oblowitz	
2001	On the Borderline	Editor	Michael Oblowitz	
2002	A Walk to Remember	Editor	Adam Shankman	
2002	Blue Crush	Editor	John Stockwell	
2003	Honey	Editor	Bille Woodruff	
2004	Modigliani	Editor	Mick Davis	
2005	The Jacket	Editor	John Maybury	
2005	Kinky Boots	Editor	Julian Jarrold	
2005	Cheaper by the Dozen 2	Additional editor	Adam Shankman	
2007	Blood & Chocolate	Editor	Katja von Garnier	
2007	How About You	Editor	Anthony Byrne	
2007	Becoming Jane	Editor	Julian Jarrold	
2008	The Edge of Love	Editor	John Maybury	
2009	The Boat That Rocked	Editor	Richard Curtis	
2009	St Trinian's 2: The Legend of Fritton's Gold	Editor	Oliver Parker; Barnaby Thompson	
2010	Worried About the Boy	Editor	Julian Jarrold	TV movie
2012	Rock of Ages	Editor	Adam Shankman	
2013	The Christmas Candle	Editor	John Stephenson	
2015	Fortitude	Editor	Sam Miller	TV series (1 episode)
2016	Miracles from Heaven	Editor	Patricia Riggen	
2016	Bad Moms	Editor	Jon Lucas; Scott Moore	
2017	Wonderwell	Editor	Vlad Marsavin	
2017	Revival !	Editor	Danny Green	
2017	A Bad Moms Christmas	Additional editor	Jon Lucas; Scott Moore	
2018	Dumplin'	Editor	Anne Fletcher	
2020	Holidate	Editor	John Whitesell	
2022	Disenchanted	Editor	Adam Shankman	
2025	G20	Editor	Patricia Riggen	
2026	Diamond	Editor	Andy Garcia	
