= Agent Game =

2022 American film by Grant S. Johnson

- Theatrical release poster
- Directed by: Grant S. Johnson
- Written by: Mike Langer; Tyler W. Konney
- Produced by: Tyler W. Konney
- Starring: Dermot Mulroney; Adan Canto; Katie Cassidy; Annie Ilonzeh; Rhys Coiro; Barkhad Abdi; Jason Isaacs; Mel Gibson
- Cinematography: David Kruta
- Edited by: Charlie Porter
- Music by: Kiley Norton
- Production companies: Taylor & Dodge; Project Infinity
- Distributed by: Saban Films
- Release date: April 8, 2022
- Running time: 90 minutes
- Country: United States
- Language: English

Agent Game is a 2022 American spy action-thriller film directed by Grant S. Johnson and written by Mike Langer and producer Tyler W. Konney. It stars Dermot Mulroney, Adan Canto (in his final film role), Katie Cassidy, Annie Ilonzeh, Rhys Coiro, Barkhad Abdi, Jason Isaacs, and Mel Gibson. Filming took place in Augusta, Georgia, from March to April 2021.

The film was released in the United States on April 8, 2022, by Saban Films. It was panned by critics.

== Plot ==
CIA officer Harris is involved in missions to detain and relocate foreign nationals for interrogation. When Harris' superior is murdered, he finds himself the scapegoat for the killing of a detainee and must run from a team of operatives sent to bring him in, led by a ruthless double agent.

== Cast ==
- Dermot Mulroney as CIA Officer Harris
- Adan Canto as CIA Operative Kavinsky
- Katie Cassidy as CIA Operative Miller
- Annie Ilonzeh as CIA Agent Caroline Visser
- Rhys Coiro as CIA Operative Reese
- Barkhad Abdi as Omar, a detainee
- Jason Isaacs as CIA Senior Officer Bill, Harris' superior
- Mel Gibson as CIA Station Chief Olsen, a high-ranking official in the CIA
- Matt Riedy as CIA Deputy Director

== Production ==
=== Development ===
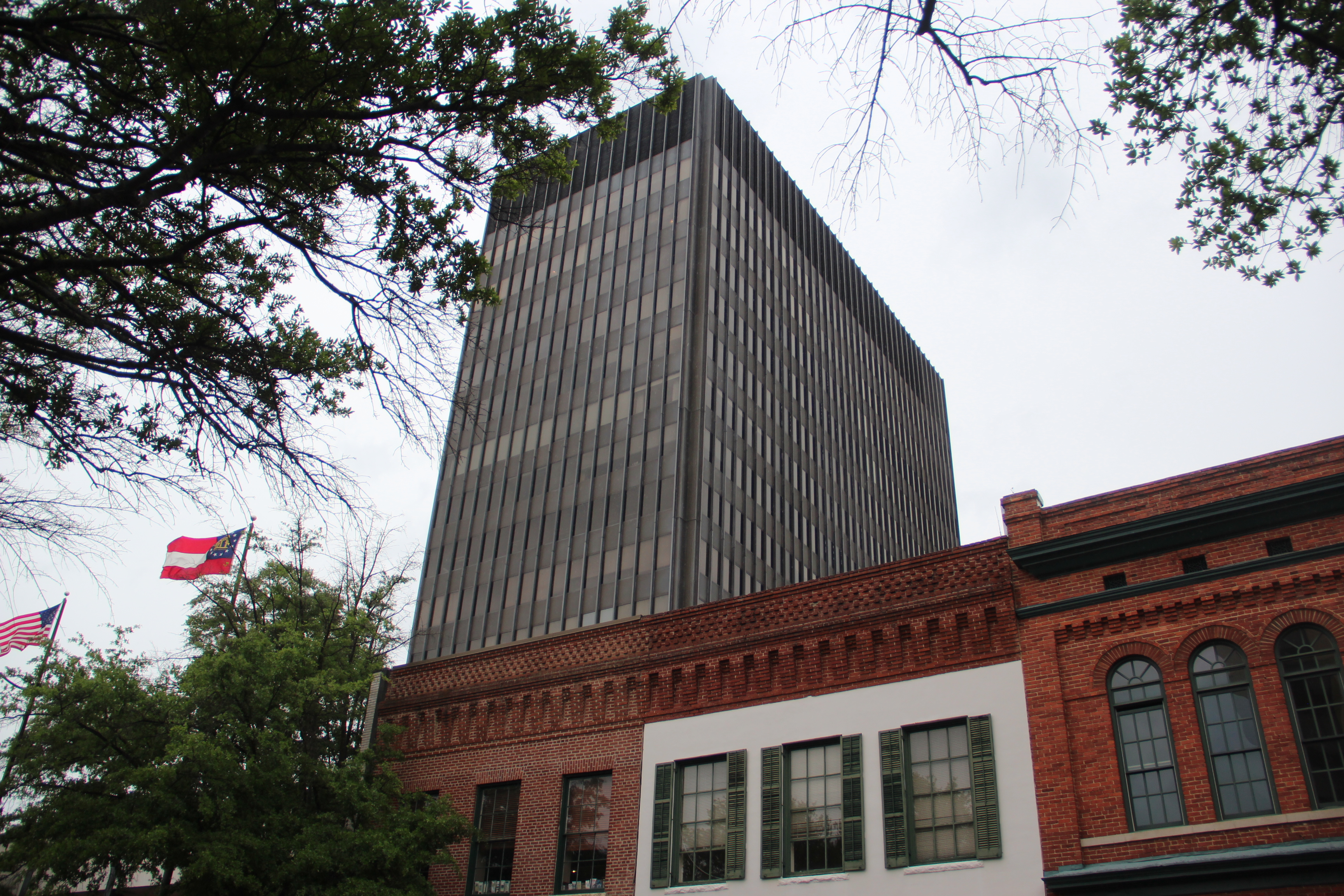
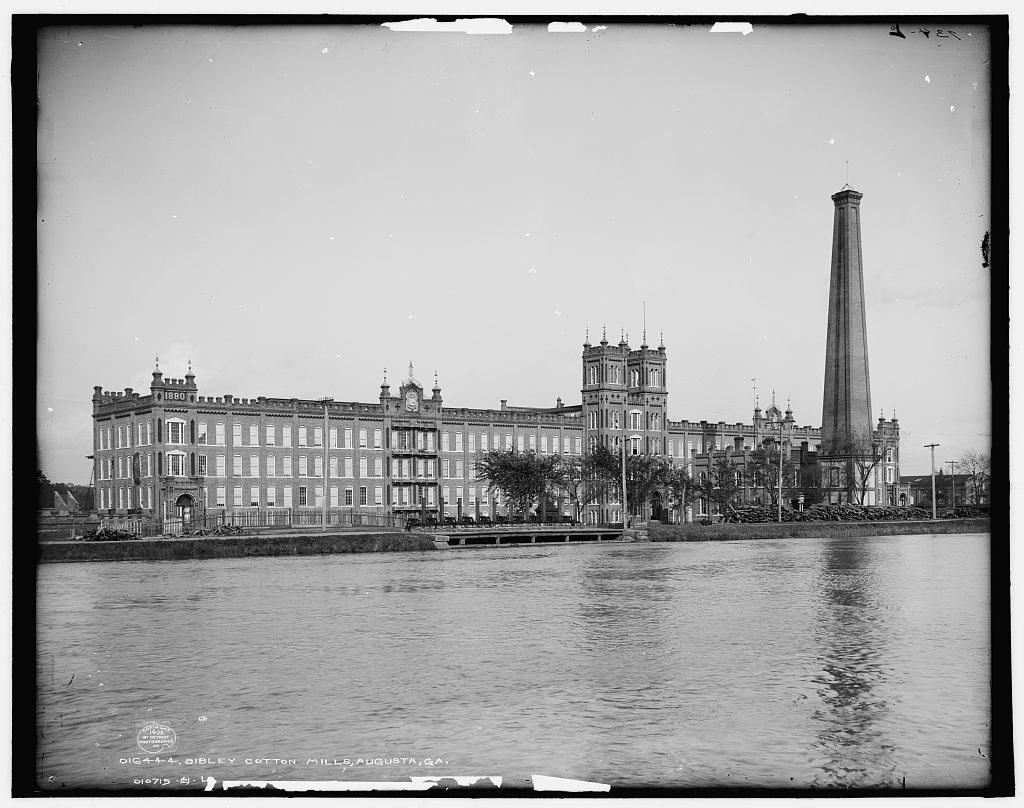
Filming took place around the Augusta University Building (top) and the Sibley Mill (bottom).

The independent film Agent Game was announced on March 5, 2021, when it was reported that Mel Gibson, Dermot Mulroney, Katherine McNamara, Rhys Coiro, and Annie Ilonzeh had been cast in the project from director Grant S. Johnson and writers Mike Langer and Tyler W. Konney. Soon after, Katie Cassidy, Jason Isaacs, Barkhad Abdi, and Adan Canto joined the cast.

=== Filming ===
Principal photography for the film began in Augusta, Georgia, on March 29, 2021, and concluded the following month on April 23. Filming locations included the Augusta University Building on 699 Broad Street, Thomson-McDuffie Regional Airport, and a warehouse on Evans to Locks Road used to replicate a European airplane hangar, where a shootout scene and multiple explosions were shot. The Sibley Mill on the Augusta Canal was also used to create the "secret spy detention center" in the film. Due to the presence of gunfire, a letter was sent to local residents before the production shot a scene in which Gibson fires a prop gun multiple times towards a moving vehicle.

In shooting the film in Georgia, production manager Mark Crump said he spoke with line producer Warren Ostergard to take the project to the state. Konney, who also co-produced the film, said that the production would help the local economy, with the Film Augusta designee, Jennifer Bowen, estimating its economic impact to be in the region of $1 million. In a separate interview, Konney also mentioned that the project was able to hire local people from Augusta for every department in the film, allowing the production crew to accomplish their "big ambitions".

== Release ==
The film was released online and in select theaters in the United States on April 8, 2022, by Saban Films.

== Reception ==
On the review aggregator website Rotten Tomatoes, 21% of 14 critics' reviews are positive, with an average rating of 4.0/10.
