= List of films about mathematicians =

This is a list of feature films and documentaries that include mathematicians, scientists who use math or references to mathematicians.

== About mathematics ==
Films where mathematics is central to the plot:

- 21 (2008) – A group of current and former MIT students, mostly mathematicians, and an algebra professor devise a card counting scheme for success at Las Vegas Strip blackjack tables.
- The Bank (2001) – A mathematician discovers a formula to predict fluctuations in the stock market.
- Cube (1997) – Six people, including math student Leaven, awake in a deathtrap based on mathematical principles.
- Fermat's Room (2007) – Three mathematicians and one inventor are invited to a house under the premise of solving a great enigma and told to use pseudonyms based on famous historical mathematicians. At the house, they are trapped in a room. They must solve puzzles given by the host, who calls himself "Fermat", in order to escape the slowly closing walls of the room.
- Gifted (2017) – Frank Adler (Chris Evans) is a single man raising a child prodigy—his spirited young niece Mary (Mckenna Grace)—in a coastal town in Florida after the death of her mother Diane, a mathematician. Mary's grandmother Evelyn (Lindsay Duncan) and uncle have different ideas on how to raise her. Mary tells her grandmother she wants to solve the problem her mother was working on, the Navier-Stokes existence and smoothness problem.
- Good Will Hunting (1997) – Janitor and genius Will Hunting (Matt Damon) begins to turn his life around with the help of a psychologist (Robin Williams) and a Fields Medal-winning professor (Stellan Skarsgård).
- I.Q. (1994) – Albert Einstein (Walter Matthau) helps a young man (Tim Robbins) pretend to be a physicist in order to catch the attention of Einstein's niece (Meg Ryan).
- An Invisible Sign (2011) – Mona Gray (Jessica Alba) gives up everything important to her in life, except mathematics, as part of a "deal with the universe" to help restore her father (a mathematician) to health. Years later, Mona teaches the subject, and does her best to help her students contend with their own personal crises.
- Marguerite's Theorem (2023) – Marguerite (Ella Rumpf) is a brilliant doctoral student at the ENS. She has been working on the Goldbach's conjecture for her thesis and leading a secluded life. However, an error is discovered in her thesis that completely destroys her work. Devastated, she leaves the academia and tries to live with people in the outside world.
- Moebius (1996) – Topologists including a young girl make contributions to the subway system and other facets of reality in Argentina in this math film with a science fiction and surreal feel.
- Moneyball (2011) – Oakland Athletics baseball team's general manager Billy Beane attempts to assemble a competitive team using statistics.
- The Oxford Murders (2008) – A Student (Elijah Wood) finds out about mysterious killings in Oxford and helped by a professor (John Hurt), they reveal the math patterns used by the killer.
- Pi (1998) – A mathematician searches for the number that underlies all of nature.
- Proof (2005) – A former student (Jake Gyllenhaal) of a recently deceased, brilliant mathematician (Anthony Hopkins) finds a notebook in his office containing a proof of an important theorem, but the mathematician's daughter (Gwyneth Paltrow) claims it is hers. The ensuing dispute is complicated by signs that she may have inherited her father's mental illness and a burgeoning romance. The movie is based on the 2001 play by David Auburn.
- Raising Genius (2004) – The film is about a boy (Justin Long) who locks himself in the bathroom to work out math equations on the shower wall.
- Sneakers (1992) – An eclectic team is blackmailed into stealing a mathematician's code-breaking box.
- Travelling Salesman (2012) – The US government hires four mathematicians to solve the most powerful problem ever to plague computer science (P vs NP problem).
- X+Y (2014) – A teenage mathematical prodigy has difficulty understanding people, but finds comfort in numbers.

== Mathematician biographical films ==
Biographical films based on real-life mathematicians:

- Agora (2009) – The life of the mathematician, astronomer, and philosopher Hypatia (Rachel Weisz), directed by Alejandro Amenábar.
- A Beautiful Mind (2001) – A fictional account based loosely on the life of mathematician John Nash (Russell Crowe), who made a breakthrough that wins him the Nobel Memorial Prize in Economic Sciences.
- Breaking the Code (1996) – A biographical film based on the life of Alan Turing adapted from the 1986 play of the same name.
- A Brief History of Time (1991) – A biographical documentary film about the physicist Stephen Hawking, directed by Errol Morris.
- Cartesius (1973) – A miniseries on the life of René Descartes, directed by Roberto Rossellini.
- Counting from Infinity: Yitang Zhang and the Twin Prime Conjecture (2015) – A documentary film by George Paul Csicsery about Yitang Zhang, a lecturer at the University of New Hampshire, working in complete isolation and making an important breakthrough towards solving the twin prime conjecture.
- Enigma (2001) – A story of romantic and psychological intrigue set in Bletchley Park during the World War II effort to crack the German Enigma machine.
- Fermat's Last Theorem (1997) – A documentary on the mathematician Andrew Wiles proving the eponymous theorem, directed by Simon Singh.
- Girls who fell in love with Math (2017) – Career profiles of mathematicians Sun-Yung Alice Chang and Fan Chung.
- Hidden Figures (2016) – African-American mathematicians Katherine Johnson, Dorothy Vaughan, and Mary Jackson are featured in this film about the early years of the NASA Project Mercury and racial and sexual segregation.
- A Hill on the Dark Side of the Moon (1983) – A drama film about the professor of mathematics, Sofya Kovalevskaya.
- The Imitation Game (2014) – British mathematician Alan Turing (Benedict Cumberbatch), a pioneer in digital computing and artificial intelligence, is tasked with cracking Nazi Germany's Enigma code that would help the Allies win World War II. A new adaptation of the play Breaking the Code.
- Infinity (1996) – A story about Nobel Prize-winning physicist Richard Feynman (Matthew Broderick).
- The Man Who Knew Infinity (2015) – The true story of Indian mathematical genius, Srinivasa Ramanujan (Dev Patel), who develops numerous properties of infinite series as a clerk in India before writing to Cambridge mathematicians who invite him to UK. Directed by Matthew Brown
- N Is a Number: A Portrait of Paul Erdős (1993) – A documentary directed by George Csicsery about the life of Hungarian mathematician Paul Erdős.
- Ramanujan (2014) – A biographical film by Gnana Rajasekaran based on the life of Srinivasa Ramanujan.
- Secrets of the Surface The Mathematical Vision of Maryam Mirzakhani (2020) – A documentary film by George Csicsery about the Fields medalist and Iranian national hero.
- Sofia Kovalevskaya (1985) – Epic film in four episodes, based on a true story of mathematician Sofya Kovalevskaya.
- The Theory of Everything (2014) – The story of the life and hardships faced by theoretical physicist and mathematician Stephen Hawking.
- Super 30 (2019) – A film about the life of mathematician and teacher Anand Kumar and its educational program named Super 30.

== With mathematician characters ==
Films where one or more of the main characters are mathematicians, but that are not otherwise about mathematics:

- It's My Turn (1980) – A mathematics professor (Jill Clayburgh) falls in love with her father's bride's son (Michael Douglas).
- The Mirror Has Two Faces (1996) – A math professor (Jeff Bridges) marries a literature professor (Barbra Streisand), but they want different things from the relationship.
- Stand and Deliver (1988) – Based on the true story of math teacher Jaime Escalante, who inspired the students at a school in a troubled Hispanic neighborhood to take Advanced Placement Calculus. The method of tabular integration is featured in the film.
- Straw Dogs (1971) – David Sumner (Dustin Hoffman) is an American mathematical physicist who moves to England, where he and his wife are violently harassed by locals.
- A Summer's Tale (1996) – A young mathematician vacationing in Brittany.
- Tall Story (1960) – A college physics and mathematics whiz is also the star basketball player, partly because he has devised equations for making baskets.
- A Serious Man (2009)
- Incendies (2010) - A graduate student (Mélissa Désormeaux-Poulin), who teaches pure mathematics in Montreal, travels to the Middle East in search of her father she thought dead.

== Featuring mathematicians ==
Films where one or more of the members of the main cast is a mathematician:

- 21 Grams (2003) – An accident changes many lives, including that of a critically ill mathematics professor (Sean Penn).
- Antonia's Line (1995) – A genealogical "line" of five generations of women includes a child prodigy, Thérèse, who grows up to be a mathematician.
- Jurassic Park (1993) – A mathematician studying chaos theory (Jeff Goldblum) is among those invited to a theme park with cloned dinosaurs, in order to assess its safety.
- The Lost World: Jurassic Park (1997) – Mathematician Ian Malcolm (Jeff Goldblum) travels to an auxiliary Jurassic Park site to document dinosaurs.

== See also ==
- List of fictional child prodigies
- Donald in Mathmagic Land
