= Proof (2005 film) =

2005 film by John Madden

- Theatrical release poster
- Directed by: John Madden
- Screenplay by: Rebecca Miller; David Auburn
- Based on: Proof by David Auburn
- Produced by: Alison Owen; Jeffrey Sharp; John Hart
- Starring: Gwyneth Paltrow; Anthony Hopkins; Jake Gyllenhaal; Hope Davis
- Cinematography: Alwin H. Küchler
- Edited by: Mick Audsley
- Music by: Stephen Warbeck
- Distributed by: Miramax Films
- Release dates: September 5, 2005 (Venice Film Festival); September 16, 2005 (U.S. theatrical)
- Running time: 100 minutes
- Country: United States
- Language: English
- Budget: $20 million
- Box office: $14,189,860

Proof is a 2005 American drama film directed by John Madden and starring Gwyneth Paltrow, Anthony Hopkins, Jake Gyllenhaal, and Hope Davis. The screenplay was written by Rebecca Miller (daughter of Arthur Miller) and David Auburn and based on Auburn's play, Proof.

== Plot ==
Robert, a brilliant mathematician who used to work at the University of Chicago, startles his daughter Catherine while she watches TV. He gives her a bottle of champagne for her birthday, and they chat. All of this turns out to be a dream; Robert died the previous week, after a long period of crippling mental illness, and his funeral is tomorrow.

Meanwhile, Hal, a former graduate student of Robert's, is reading through the latter's notebooks, which are filled with meaningless notes. Hal believes that Robert's genius may have withstood his mental illness, and clues to that genius might lie in one of his notebooks. When Hal comments on the vast amount of work Robert did, a suspicious Catherine searches Hal's backpack. A notebook eventually falls out of his coat. He explains that he wanted to give her the notebook as a birthday present because it "had something written in it about her". Hal is forced to leave, giving the notebook as intended, when Catherine calls the police.

The next day, Catherine's sister, New Yorker Claire, arrives in town. At the funeral, Catherine berates the many attendees for not being there for Robert during his descent into insanity. She ends by saying that she is glad her father died and leaves mid-funeral.

Claire decides to sell Robert's house back to the university and wants Catherine to come with her to New York. A wake held at the house the night is attended by academic mathematicians. Hal appears and chats up Catherine. Softening up to Hal, Catherine has emotional sex with him.

In flashbacks, Robert is shown invigorated, believing that he has seen the beginnings of a new mathematical proof that will prove his triumph over mental illness. In the present, Catherine gives Hal a key to Robert's desk and tells him to check the locked drawer for a notebook which contains an important proof. Excited, he shows the discovery to Catherine and Claire. He asks how long Catherine knew about this and why she did not mention it. Catherine, a promising mathematician herself, says that she wrote it and not Robert, despite evidence to the contrary. Neither Hal nor Claire believe Catherine. Hal believes that the proof's mathematics are beyond Catherine, while Claire suspects that Catherine is suffering the onset of mental illness. Hal decides to take the notebook to the math department to verify the proof's accuracy.

He eventually returns as Claire and Catherine are leaving, with news that the math department believes the proof to be valid. Hal does not think that Robert wrote the proof because it employs newer mathematics and wants Catherine to explain it. Catherine remains stung by his earlier lack of trust, and the sisters leave for the airport. Hal sprints after the car and throws the book through the window and onto Catherine's lap.

In another flashback, it is revealed that, while living together, Robert challenged Catherine to work on math, which she does, ultimately completing a proof, which she describes in one of the house's notebooks. Catherine goes to tell Robert about the breakthrough, but he insists that she read aloud the proof that he is working on. To Catherine's disappointment, Robert's notebook contains only ramblings. Reading his work, Catherine realizes that Robert has not overcome his mental illness.

Catherine has begun to come to terms with herself, aided by Hal's confidence in her. She decides that she does not need to go with her sister to New York and leaves the airport. She returns to the University of Chicago, where she and Hal meet up and discuss the proof.

== Cast ==
- Gwyneth Paltrow as Catherine Llewellyn
- Anthony Hopkins as Robert Llewellyn, Catherine's widowed father
- Jake Gyllenhaal as Hal Dobbs, a former graduate student of Robert's
- Hope Davis as Claire Llewellyn, Catherine's older sister, a financial analyst
- Roshan Seth as Professor Bhandari

== Production ==
The film is based on the four-character stage play Proof. The film adds many bit parts for the sake of realism, and "opens up" the setting considerably. The role of Catherine was first played by Mary-Louise Parker in the play's 2000 Manhattan Theatre Club original production. Gwyneth Paltrow played Catherine in a London stage production before being cast in the film.

Hopkins' character is a mathematics professor at the University of Chicago. Although scenes were filmed on the university's campus, the mathematics building itself (Eckhart Hall) was not used. Instead, scenes that were set in the math building were actually shot at the Divinity School. The scene with the professor's memorial service was shot in the university's Rockefeller Chapel. The film opens with a pan of Gwyneth Paltrow's character bicycling across the Midway Plaisance and shows scenes in the quadrangle before Harper Library.

== Reception ==
=== Box office ===
Proof opened at #35 in its opening weekend with $193,840 and went on to gross $7,535,331 in the US and $14,189,860 worldwide.

=== Critical reception ===
Proof received generally positive reviews from film critics. Review aggregator Rotten Tomatoes gave the film a 62% rating, with an average rating of 6.4/10, based on 143 reviews. The consensus reads, "Gwyneth Paltrow and Anthony Hopkins give exceptional performances in a film that intelligently tackles the territory between madness and genius." Metacritic, which uses a weighted average, assigned the film a score of 64 out of 100, based on 37 critics, indicating "generally favorable" reviews.

=== Awards and nominations ===
Gwyneth Paltrow received a Golden Globe Award nomination for Best Actress – Motion Picture Drama for Proof, but lost to Felicity Huffman for Transamerica.

The film won the Georges Delerue Award for Best Soundtrack/Sound Design at Film Fest Gent in 2005.

=== Mathematical relevance ===
Since 1993 (when Andrew Wiles first claimed to have proven Fermat's Last Theorem), there have been several feature films about mathematicians, notably Good Will Hunting (1997), Pi (1998), A Beautiful Mind (2001), Proof (2005), Travelling Salesman (2012), The Imitation Game (2014), and Gifted (2017).

In a 2006 review, mathematician Daniel Ullman called Proof "richer and deeper, simultaneously both funnier and more serious, than either A Beautiful Mind or Good Will Hunting." He also wrote: "Of these three films, Proof is the one that most realistically illustrates the world of mathematics and mathematicians." Ullman praised the director, too: "Madden should be credited with capturing the feeling of the mathematical world."

Timothy Gowers of the University of Cambridge, a Fields Medalist, and Paul Sally of the University of Chicago, acted as mathematical consultants, although the latter was dismissive of the film's mathematical relevance and accuracy.

Some cited mathematical concepts are Sophie Germain primes, taxicab numbers, abstract algebra, differential equations. Around minute 31, the protagonist cites by heart the number $92305 \times 2^{16998} + 1$, saying that it is the largest known Germain prime. This was briefly true in the 1990s.

== See also ==
- List of films about mathematicians
