= N Is a Number: A Portrait of Paul Erdős =

- Directed by: George Paul Csicsery
- Starring: Paul Erdős
- Cinematography: John Knoop
- Music by: Mark Adler
- Release date: 1993
- Running time: 57 minutes
- Country: United States
- Language: English

N Is a Number: A Portrait of Paul Erdős is a 1993 biographical documentary about the life of mathematician Paul Erdős, directed by George Paul Csicsery.

The film was made between 1988 and 1991, capturing Erdős in various countries along with some of his numerous collaborators. It covers his unusual career, his personal life, and many of his recurring jokes and anecdotes, including that of Erdős numbers.

The film won the Gold Apple Award (National Educational Film & Video Festival), and the Gold Plaque Award (Science/Nature, Documentary category, Chicago International Film Festival).

== See also ==
- The Man Who Loved Only Numbers (1998), a biographical book
- List of topics named after Paul Erdős
- List of films about mathematicians
