= Dead Girl (film) =

- Directed by: Adam Coleman Howard
- Written by: Adam Coleman Howard
- Produced by: Lisa M. Hansen
- Starring: Anne Parillaud; Adam Coleman Howard; Val Kilmer; Emily Lloyd; Amanda Plummer; Seymour Cassel; Famke Janssen
- Edited by: Emma E. Hickox
- Production company: CineTel Films
- Release date: September 22, 1996 (Japan)
- Country: United States
- Language: English

Dead Girl is an American film written and directed by Adam Coleman Howard, who costars with Anne Parillaud. The cast also includes Teri Hatcher and Val Kilmer.

== Plot ==
Ari Rose, an unsuccessful actor, becomes infatuated with a beautiful woman named Helen-Catherine. Around the same time as this obsession takes hold, Ari learns that his regular therapist, Dr. Dark, has been replaced by his eccentric son (also named Dr. Dark). Ari manages to go on a date with Helen-Catherine, but when she refuses to kiss him, he strangles her to death. Ari takes her dead body home, still believing her to be alive. After a visit with Dr. Dark the next day where Ari recounts the date as if nothing bad happened, he goes home and has sex with Helen-Catherine’s corpse.

Ari’s mental instability is apparent throughout the film. He continues to treat Helen-Catherine as if she is alive, getting bold enough to take her lifeless body out in public, and continues to unsuccessfully pursue an acting career. In his visits with Dr. Dark, Ari relays how his relationship and career is progressing. Helen-Catherine’s roommate Frieda barges into Ari’s apartment one night to ask about her roommate’s whereabouts, but she fails to realize Helen-Catherine’s body is in the room before Ari gets her to leave.

Failing to land a successful acting audition himself, Ari poses as Helen-Catherine’s manager. When Helen-Catherine lands an audition, he wheels her lifeless body into the audition in a wheelchair. The director loves Helen-Catherine’s performance and she gets the part. While at first happy for her, Ari breaks down further and the two have a “fight”.

On the movie set, Helen-Catherine’s lifelessness continues to go unnoticed by the crew. Later on, Ari attacks the director after discovering him having sex with her corpse, and is heartbroken by his girlfriend’s infidelity. In retaliation, Ari makes advances towards Helen-Catherine’s roommate Frieda, killing her and making her his new girlfriend to get even with Helen-Catherine.

Having eventually told Dr. Dark too much, Ari is arrested and thrown in prison. Ari eventually takes his own life during his sentence.

== Cast ==
- Adam Coleman Howard as Ari Rose
- Anne Parillaud as Helen-Catherine Howe
- Amanda Plummer as Frida
- Seymour Cassel as Ira Golub
- Famke Janssen as Treasure
- Val Kilmer as Dr. Dark
- Sasha Jenson as Short Cop
- Justin Lazard as Young Actor
- Emily Lloyd as Mother
- William McNamara as Damon
- Michael Wincott as Mark in the Park
- Teri Hatcher as Passerby

== Reception ==
A retrospective very negative review in The New York Times stated, "Certainly Very Bad Things and Dead-Alive, among other films, have proven that tasteless material can be funny, and even -- as in the wonderfully morbid The Loved One -- satirical. The real problem here is that Adam Coleman Howard is equally inept in all three of his capacities on this film. His script is poor (satirizing Hollywood even less incisively than the wretched Burn, Hollywood, Burn), his direction is hamfisted and self-indulgent, and his onscreen persona is completely devoid of charisma or interest. It is usually the case that when tasteless subject matter is handled poorly, it seems even more offensive than it really is. In this case, however, it is handled so poorly as to merely provoke yawns."

"Moments of explosions of madness, frequent visits to psychiatrist Dr. Dar (Val Kilmer) -crazier than he is- are the most effervescent moments in the film. To spice things up, Frida (Amanda Plummer), Helen's roommate, falls in love with Ari. Monotonous moments are also part of it, like Helen's eternal apathy.", commented Folha de São Paulo in a brief review.
