= A Rock and a Hard Place: One Boy's Triumphant Story (book) =

Fictional character

- Author: Anthony Godby Johnson (purported); Vicki Johnson (probable)
- Publisher: Crown Publishers, Little, Brown & Company
- Publication date: 1993
- Pages: 214
- ISBN: 978-0517595015

A Rock and a Hard Place: One Boy's Triumphant Story is a 1993 memoir purported to have been written by "Anthony Godby Johnson". Subsequent investigations suggest that Johnson is likely to have been the literary creation of Vicki Johnson.

The book outlines the detail of Anthony Godby Johnson who is described as a 14-year-old dying of syphilis and AIDS, with an amputated leg, and 54 broken bones, caused by the abuse of his biological parents, and others. The story was part of a 1997 ABC special "About Us: The Dignity of Children", an Emmy-nominated show about the resilience of children, hosted by Oprah Winfrey.

== Depictions in print ==
The book initially appeared as an autobiography, describing Johnson's survival of an abusive childhood at the hands of his parents and their friends, his adoption by a new family, and his subsequent contraction of HIV/AIDS.

A second, lesser-known book was published under Johnson's name in 1994, entitled Love Letters to Hawaii from Aboard the A-Train.

== Investigation ==
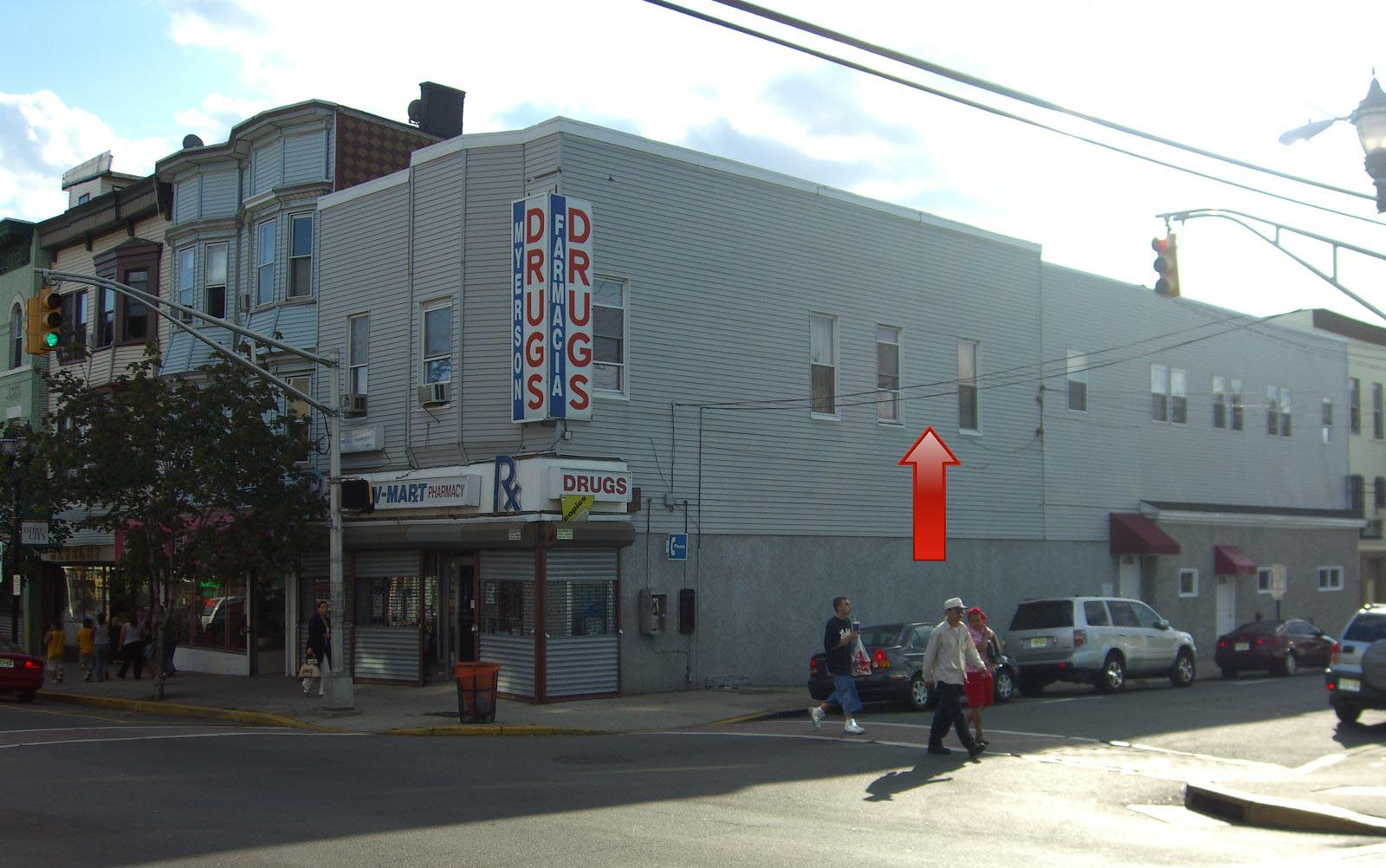
Residence at the corner of Summit Avenue and 11th Street in Union City, New Jersey. The arrow points to the windows indicated by the 20/20 story to have been the apartment where Vicki Johnson lived.

When several magazines and journalists, including Newsweek and Keith Olbermann, attempted to investigate the claims of the book and profile Johnson, they contacted the woman who claimed to be his adoptive mother, Vicki Johnson. Suspicion was raised when it was learned that no one other than Vicki Johnson had actually seen Johnson – not his agent, his editor, nor his publicist. Further concerns were raised when a voice analysis expert analyzed calls from "Anthony" and identified the voice to be that of Vicki Johnson. As a result of these irregularities, Olbermann hired an investigator, who suggested that there was no Johnson and the story was fabricated.

A Rock and a Hard Place claimed that Johnson's biological parents were arrested and tried for abusing him, and that his police officer father was killed in prison. An alleged conspiracy of rogue police officers trying to kill Johnson was Vicki Johnson's justification for zealously preserving Johnson's privacy. However, no case matching that description could be found at any social service agency.

Many sources found it medically implausible that Johnson could be alive, given that he had supposedly been living with AIDS for over 19 years. Most long-term survivors are actually living with HIV but had not yet developed AIDS; furthermore, the medications that slow the progress of the disease were not known at the time that Johnson's AIDS allegedly became severe.

Further investigation by snopes.com has turned up still more evidence that Johnson never existed. No birth records are available for Johnson and adoption is a time consuming and lengthy legal process. The state of New York has no record of a boy by that name or fitting that description having ever been adopted by anyone with his supposed adoptive mother's name. Even in a time before computers, it would have been impossible to adopt a child without creating a paper trail. Also, in his book, Johnson stated that his biological father was an ex-police officer in New York, and that he had been tried, convicted, and killed in prison. However, no record exists of a police officer with his supposed biological father's name, and the New York State Department of Corrections and Community Supervision lists no inmate by that name having ever been incarcerated, let alone killed in prison. Were these things true, verification could easily be obtained by internet searches or Freedom of Information Act requests. Lastly, no court records exist which list a couple with the names of Johnson's supposed biological mother and father, who were supposedly tried and convicted of the crimes Johnson alleged in his book.

== Aftermath ==
Paul Monette wrote a foreword for an edition of A Rock and a Hard Place, later defending the book's veracity. Armistead Maupin, who wrote a blurb for an edition of A Rock and a Hard Place, later wrote The Night Listener, a novel subsequently made into a film, in which the main character begins correspondence with an HIV-positive boy who is not what he seems. The book parallels Maupin's experience with Johnson. The story was also adapted for a 2002 episode of Law & Order: Criminal Intent entitled "Faith", with the child's sex being changed to female and the illness to amyotrophic lateral sclerosis.

On January 12, 2007, the ABC newsmagazine program 20/20 revealed new evidence that Anthony was Vicki Johnson's fictional creation. The photo of "Anthony" that Vicki had sent to Anthony's supporters was revealed to be a childhood photo of a healthy adult man who was shocked to find his childhood photo being represented to people as that of Anthony Godby Johnson; one childhood teacher of this man had been Vicki Johnson, who was said to have taken pictures of the children in her class.

Vicki Johnson, whose real name was Joanne Vicki Fraginals, had allegedly handed Anthony over to another caretaker in 1997 when she moved to Chicago and married Marc Zackheim, a child psychologist and owner of the Associates of Clinical Psychology.

== See also ==
- Misery literature

== Sources ==
- Friend, Tad (November 26, 2001). "Virtual Love". The New Yorker. pp. 86–89.
