= Pacific Palisades (film) =

- Theatrical release poster
- Directed by: Bernard Schmitt
- Written by: Bernard Schmitt; Marion Vernoux
- Produced by: Bernard Verley; Lise Fayolle
- Starring: Sophie Marceau
- Cinematography: Martial Barrault
- Music by: Jean-Jacques Goldman; Michael Jones; Roland Romanelli
- Production companies: Sandor, BVF
- Distributed by: AFMD
- Release date: 28 March 1990 (France)
- Running time: 92 minutes
- Countries: France; United States
- Language: English

Pacific Palisades is a 1990 French-American comedy film directed by Bernard Schmitt and starring Sophie Marceau in her American film debut, Adam Coleman Howard, and Anne E. Curry. The movie was filmed in Los Angeles, California.

== Plot ==
A woman from Paris, Bernadette, comes to the United States after being promised a job. When she arrives, however, she learns that she is the victim of a hoax. Unable to return to France, Bernadette looks for work while staying with her close friend Shirley (Anne Curry), an actress looking for her big break. Their friendship is challenged when Bernadette finds herself falling in love with Shirley's boyfriend.

== Cast ==
- Sophie Marceau as Bernardette
- Adam Coleman Howard as Ben
- Anne E. Curry as Liza
- Toni Basil as Désirée
- Virginia Capers as Shirley
- Diana Barton as Jill
- Sydney Lassick as Mr. Beer
- André Weinfeld as The Frenchie
- Caroline Grimm as Marion
- Maaike Jansen as Maman
- Farida Khelfa as Julie
- Isabelle Mergault as Sandrine
- Valérie Moureaux as Mimi
- Gérard Surugue as Rémi
- Bernard Verley
