= Radio Man =

American actor

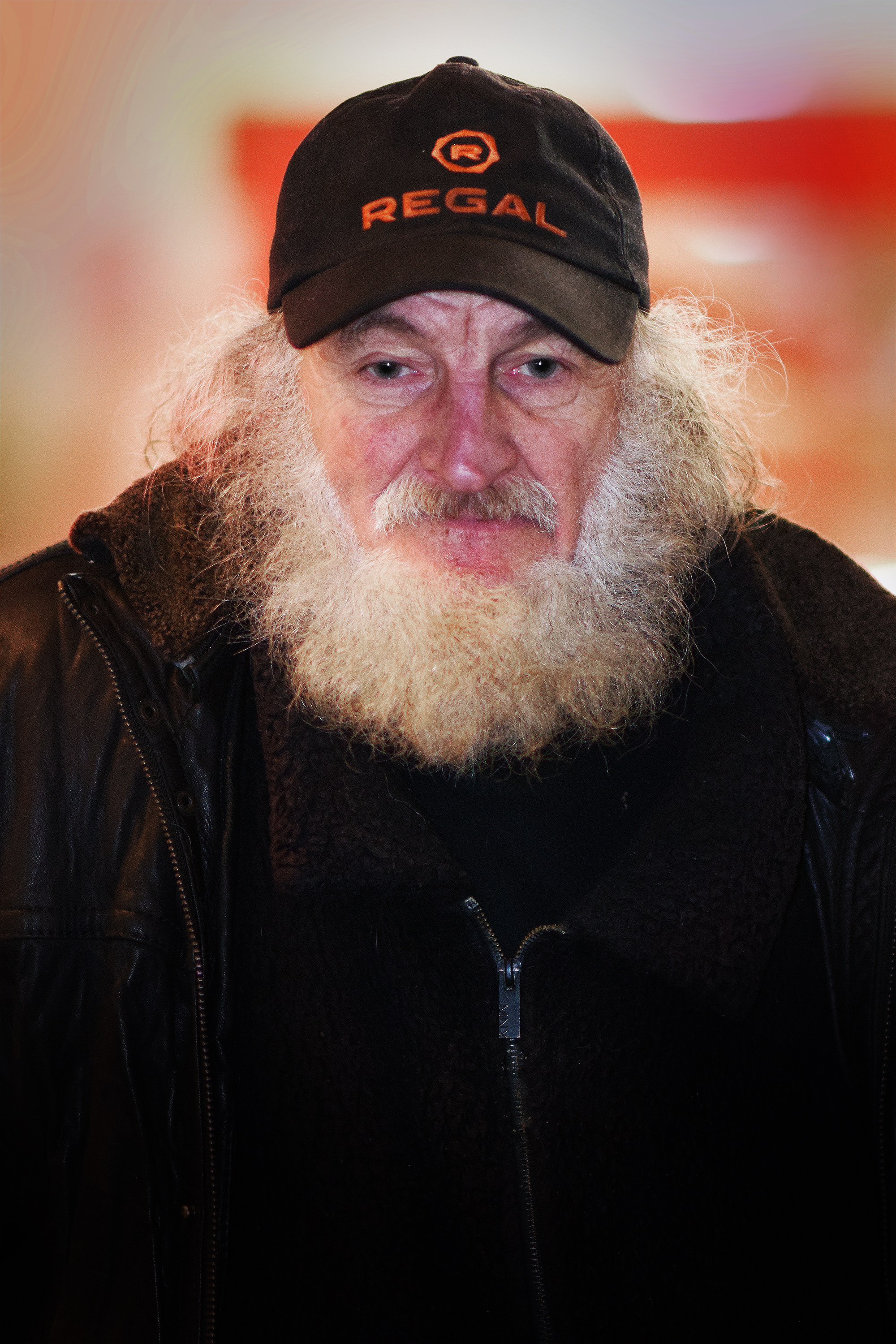
- Radio Man in 2024
- Born: Craig Castaldo; 1950 (age 75–76)
- Other name: Craig Schwartz
- Citizenship: United States
- Occupation: Actor
- Years active: 1989–present

Craig Castaldo (born 1950), known as Radio Man or Radioman, is an American actor known for making over 300 appearances as an extra on stage and screen. He is known for wearing a radio around his neck.

He has made cameos in the TV series 30 Rock and It's Always Sunny in Philadelphia and in the films The Departed, Shutter Island, Just My Luck, Romance & Cigarettes, Elf, Two Weeks Notice, Glitter, Keeping the Faith, Godzilla, Ransom, Big Daddy, Mr. Deeds, The Secret Life of Walter Mitty, The Other Woman, The Bourne Trilogy, and other films and television shows.

He is famous in New York City and has been written about in The New York Times and the New York Daily News. Whoopi Goldberg took him to the Oscars as her guest one of the years she hosted.

== Biography ==
Castaldo grew up in Brooklyn. He once worked for the U.S. Postal Service. Castaldo served in the Vietnam War. He was homeless for almost two years, staying at Penn Station. He found a job at a newsstand in Manhattan and acquired subsidized housing in Brooklyn.

His first cameo occurred when he was asked to move so that a shot could be filmed at his newsstand. When he refused, he ended up in the scene. At the time, Castaldo was homeless and suffered from alcoholism. He would often heckle actors who passed by his newsstand. He began visiting movie sets in 1989, starting with The Fisher King, in which he met Robin Williams. He was able to locate film sets with the help of Teamsters or by finding "No Parking" signs that indicate an upcoming shoot. In the 1990s when he was drinking he was arrested and had a 6-month evaluation at a psychiatric hospital, but he continued to visit film sets after his release. He gave up alcohol and has not had a drink since. As of 2004, he lived in Brooklyn and earned money from selling autographs as well as from his film appearances.

According to The New York Times, he is a life member of the Screen Actors Guild and "knows the whos, whens and wheres of just about every film production in New York." As an actor, he typically plays homeless or disheveled-looking characters.

== Documentary ==
A documentary film about Radio Man titled Radioman was released in April 2012, premiering at Toronto's Hot Docs documentary film festival. Directed by Mary Kerr, the film won the Grand Jury Prize at Doc NYC. It features such stars as Tom Hanks, Robin Williams, Meryl Streep, George Clooney, Josh Brolin, Johnny Depp, Matt Damon, Ricky Gervais, James Gandolfini, Robert Downey Jr., Jude Law, Whoopi Goldberg, Helen Mirren, Tilda Swinton, Alfred Molina, Ron Howard, Shia LaBeouf, and Tina Fey talking to and about Radio Man. He was present at screenings of the film and participated in the Q&A sessions. He reportedly stated that Robin Williams was his favorite celebrity and that Martin Scorsese is his favorite director to work with.

== Filmography ==
=== Film ===
Year	Title	Role	Notes
1991	The Fisher King	Himself	
1996	Ransom	Himself	
1997	Donnie Brasco	Himself	
1998	Godzilla	Himself	
1998	The Siege	N/A (stunts)	
2000	Keeping the Faith	Himself	
2000	Little Nicky	Bum in Alley	Scenes deleted
2000	Miss Congeniality	Himself	
2001	Glitter	Himself	
2001	Zoolander	Himself	
2002	Spider-Man	Man with Bike in Front of Moondance Diner	Uncredited
2002	Mr. Deeds	Himself	
2002	Two Weeks Notice	Himself	Uncredited
2003	Elf	Himself	Uncredited
2003	How To Lose A Guy In 10 Days	Himself	Uncredited
2003	Uptown Girls	Himself	
2004	Jersey Girl	Himself	
2004	The Bourne Supremacy	Himself	
2005	Romance & Cigarettes	Slick Haired Man	Uncredited
2005	Game 6	Himself	Uncredited
2006	Just My Luck	Bicycle Driver	Uncredited
2006	The Departed	Crack House Denizen	
2007	Spider-Man 3	Himself	Uncredited
2007	Enchanted	Homeless Man	Uncredited
2010	Shutter Island	Himself	
2010	Wall Street: Money Never Sleeps	Himself	
2011	Tower Heist	Himself	
2012	Rhymes With Banana	Himself	
2012	Radioman	Himself	Documentary
2013	Blood Ties	Park Goer	
2013	The Secret Life of Walter Mitty	News Stand Guy	
2014	The Amazing Spider-Man 2	Himself	Uncredited
2014	The Other Woman	Himself	
2015	Ovum	Audition creeper	
2016	The Comedian	Soup Kitchen Patron #1	
2016	No Pay, Nudity	Kiosk Bike Man	
2019	Nighthawks	Homeless Man	
2019	The Irishman	Man in Wheelchair	
2019	Being	Earnest	
2022	Domani	Mr. Domani	Short film
2023	Killers of the Flower Moon	Himself	Uncredited
2024	IF	Himself	Uncredited
2024	The Union	Himself	Uncredited
2024	A Complete Unknown	Himself	Uncredited
2025	Highest 2 Lowest	Man on Train	
2026	One Night Only	Himself	Uncredited

=== Television ===
Year	Title	Role	Notes
2001	NYPD Blue	Radioman	Episode: "Waking Up Is Hard to Do"; Uncredited
2007; 2010	30 Rock	Various characters including "Moon Vest" - a homeless man who wears a vest with moons on it - as a pun on Les Moonves, former CEO of CBS Corporation.	9 episodes: S1.E1 - Pilot S1.E11 - "The Head and the Hair" (2007), S1.E13 -"Up All Night" (2007) S2.E7 - "Cougars" (2007), S3.E14 -"The Funcooker" (2009) S4.E4 - "Audition Day" (2009) S4.E22 - "I Do Do" (2010), S5.E2 - "When It Rains, It Pours" (2010) S5.E21 -"100, Part 2"
2014	Unforgettable	Radioman	Episode: "The Island"
2025	Daredevil: Born Again	Radioman	Episode: "Straight to Hell"
2026	The Punisher: One Last Kill	Himself	Disney+ special, Uncredited
