= Jeffrey Sharp =

American film producer

Jeffrey Sharp is an American feature film and TV producer and Executive Director of The Gotham Film & Media Institute (formerly Independent Filmmaker Project).

== Career ==
Sharp has produced a series of Academy Award and Golden Globe-winning and nominated films, including Boys Don't Cry, You Can Count on Me, Nicholas Nickleby, and Proof. Additional credits as Producer include: A Home at the End of the World, The Night Listener, Evening, and The Yellow Birds. Sharp's recent US-China co-productions include: "My Other Home (film)", "Wonderful Life (TV)", and "Crazy Alien (film)".

Sharp co-founded the digital publisher Open Road Integrated Media with former HarperCollins CEO Jane Friedman, which has become a leading independent e-book publisher in the US. At Open Road, Sharp looked for new ways to option film and TV rights as part of the publishing process, which led to the formation of Story Mining & Supply in Los Angeles in 2012 where Sharp, as President and CEO, oversaw the development and production of several feature films and TV shows from Open Road and other publishing properties including Outlander (nominated for three Golden Globes®). Sharp launched Sharp Independent Pictures in 2016 with GEM Pictures to produce films for the US and China co-production market.

Sharp has served on the Colgate University Board of Trustees since 2019. He is a member of AMPAS (The Academy of Motion Picture Arts and Sciences), a member of the Hamptons International Film Festival Advisory Board and has served as Special Advisor for the Book Meets Film Forum at the Taipei International Book Expo, as well as London Book Fair, Frankfurt Book Fair and BookExpo of America. Sharp won an Independent Spirit Award for Best First Feature for You Can Count on Me, was nominated for a Best Picture Golden Globe for Nicholas Nickleby, and was honored with the Andrew Sarris Award in 2005 from the Columbia University School of the Arts for his contribution to independent film. Sharp graduated with an MFA in Film Studies from Columbia University and a BA from Colgate University.

== Personal life ==
Jeffrey Sharp is the son of William Sharp (Scientist).

== Filmography ==
Year	Title	Director	Box office	Notes
1991	The Doors	Oliver Stone	$34.4 million	
1998	Dark Harbor	Adam Coleman Howard		
1999	Boys Don't Cry	Kimberly Peirce	$20.7 million Academy Award for Best Actress; Winner Academy Award for Best Supporting Actress; Nominated; Golden Globe Award for Best Actress; Winner; Golden Globe Award for Best Supporting Actress; Nominated	GLAAD Media Award for Outstanding Film – Limited Release; Nominated - Guldbagge Award for Best Foreign Film; Nominated - Independent Spirit Award for Best First Feature; Nominated - National Board of Review Award for Best Film; Nominated - Satellite Award for Best Film
2000	You Can Count on Me	Kenneth Lonergan	$11 million Academy Award for Best Actress; Nominated; Academy Award for Best Adapted Screenplay; Nominated	American Film Institute Award - Movie of the Year; Independent Spirit Award for Best First Feature; Nominated - Critics' Choice Movie Award for Best Picture; Nominated - Chicago Film Critics Association Award for Best Film; Nominated - Dallas–Fort Worth Film Critics Association Award for Best Film; Nominated - National Board of Review Award for Best Film
2001	Lift	DeMane Davis & Khari Streeter		Nominated - Black Reel Award for Outstanding Television Movie or Limited Series
2002	Nicholas Nickleby	Douglas McGrath	$3.7 million	Nominated - Golden Globe Award for Best Motion Picture – Musical or Comedy; Nominated - Young Artist Award - Best Family Feature Film - Drama
2003	Just Another Story	GQ		
2003	Undefeated	John Leguizamo		TV movie
2004	A Home at the End of the World	Michael Mayer	$1.5 million	Nominated - GLAAD Media Award for Outstanding Film – Wide Release
2004	P.S.	Dylan Kidd	$180.000	
2005	Proof	John Madden	$14.2 million Golden Globe Award for Best Actress; Nominated	
2006	The Night Listener	Patrick Stettner	$10.8 million	Nominated - GLAAD Media Award for Outstanding Film – Wide Release
2007	Evening	Lajos Koltai	$20 million	
2016	My Other Home	Zi Yang		
2017	The Yellow Birds	Alexandre Moors		
