= Quiet Cool =

1986 action film directed by Clay Borris

- Theatrical release poster
- Directed by: Clay Borris
- Written by: Clay Borris; Susan Vercellino
- Produced by: Gerald T. Olson; Robert Shaye
- Starring: James Remar; Adam Coleman Howard; Daphne Ashbrook; Jared Martin; Nick Cassavetes; Fran Ryan
- Cinematography: Jacques Haitkin
- Edited by: Bob Brady
- Music by: Jay Ferguson
- Distributed by: New Line Cinema
- Release date: November 8, 1986 (USA)
- Running time: 80 minutes
- Country: United States
- Language: English
- Box office: $1.9 million

Quiet Cool is a 1986 American action film directed and co-written by Clay Borris, and starring James Remar, Adam Coleman Howard, Daphne Ashbrook, Jared Martin, Nick Cassavetes and Fran Ryan.

== Plot ==
Joe Dylanne is a plain-clothes NYC cop with a badge and a robust personality. He always resorts to unconventional methods in order to capture the city's slickest criminals. When Dylanne receives a message from Katy, an old sweetheart of his, the news is not as pleasant as he anticipated. Rather, it is an imperative call for help. Dylanne must swing into full action. This cop must travel to a remote location in the northwest in order to investigate the disappearances of his friend's relatives. It turns out that most of Kate's relatives have been murdered in cold blood. The only survivor of the slaughter is Joshua, an angst-ridden survivalist who explains to Dylanne about a sophisticated plan implicating marijuana plant growers. Dylanne and Joshua must trespass enemy territory in the name of revenge.

== Cast ==
- James Remar as Officer Joe Dylanne
- Adam Coleman Howard as Joshua Greer
- Daphne Ashbrook as Katy Greer
- Jared Martin as Mike Prior
- Nick Cassavetes as Valence
- Joey Sagal as Toker
- Chris Mulkey as 'Red'
- Clayton Landey as Cairo
- Brooks Gardner as 'Pink'
- Fran Ryan as Ma
- Ted White as Ellis
- Rob Moran as Briggs
- Travis McKenna as 'Handlebar'
