= The Business of Strangers =

2001 film by Patrick Stettner

- Theatrical release poster
- Directed by: Patrick Stettner
- Written by: Patrick Stettner
- Produced by: Robert H. Nathan
- Starring: Stockard Channing; Julia Stiles; Fred Weller
- Cinematography: Teodoro Maniaci
- Edited by: Keiko Deguchi
- Music by: Alex Lasarenko
- Distributed by: IFC Films
- Release dates: January 19, 2001 (Sundance); December 21, 2001 (United States)
- Running time: 84 minutes
- Country: United States
- Language: English

The Business of Strangers is a 2001 American drama film that tells the story of an eventful night shared between a middle-aged businesswoman and her young assistant. The independent film was written and directed by Patrick Stettner. It stars Stockard Channing and Julia Stiles.

== Plot ==
Julie Styron is a middle-aged business woman flying out of town to attend an important meeting. When her CEO contacts her and asks her to meet him for dinner afterward, she worries that her job may be in danger and engages the help of a headhunter named Nick Harris to look for a new position. Her mood worsens when her new assistant Paula Murphy is 45 minutes late to the meeting, which as a result goes badly. After its end, Julie fires Paula and they part ways.

Later that evening Julie is unexpectedly promoted to CEO of the company. After both their flights home are delayed, Julie and Paula meet up by chance in a hotel bar. Julie apologizes for losing her temper earlier and buys Paula a drink. As they talk, Julie, who gave up having a family for her career, begins to question whether she made the right choice. The two of them visit the gym and the pool before returning to the bar.

Nick joins them, explaining that his flight was also canceled. Paula rushes off to the bathroom and is followed by Julie, who wants to know what was wrong. Later, Paula informs her that Nick raped a friend of hers in Boston. Julie is shocked but eventually convinced, and suggests they get revenge. Paula tells her to just forget about it.

The two retire to Julie's room, and when Nick knocks on the door later on, Paula invites him in and then drugs him. In order to keep him from realizing what they've done, the two women take him down into a restricted area of the hotel which is being renovated. Julie runs upstairs to get Nick's briefcase, and returns to find Paula stripping him. Paula explains that this way when he wakes up he will hesitate to ask anyone what happened.

Paula photographs them all with her Polaroid camera. Paula finds a magic marker and they write words on Nick's chest and back like "pig" and "rapist". They are nearly discovered by a security guard, but he leaves without seeing them. Paula eventually confesses to Julie that it was she who was raped, not her friend — which Julie had already guessed. They return to Julie's room and sleep.

The next morning, Julie finds the word "loser" written in marker on her own stomach, and a few Polaroids on the bed of Paula sitting next to her own sleeping form. At the airport she meets up with Nick again. He reveals that he had never been to Boston, proving Paula's rape story to be an elaborate lie.

== Cast ==
- Stockard Channing as Julie Styron
- Julia Stiles as Paula Murphy
- Fred Weller as Nick Harris
- Mary Testa as receptionist
- Jack Hallett as Mr. Fostwick
- Marcus Giamatti as Robert

== Reception ==
The film received positive reviews from critics. On the review aggregator website Rotten Tomatoes, 81% of 95 critics' reviews are positive, with an average rating of 7.3/10. The website's consensus reads: "The Business of Strangers showcases a complex, compelling performance by Channing. Her interactions and clashes with Stiles make for riveting viewing." On Metacritic, the film has a score of 67 out of 100, based on 30 reviews.

Writing for the BBC, Neil Smith compared the film favorably to In the Company of Men, praising the "insightful script, [...] sleek cinematography, and [...] acerbic one-liners" along with "the inspired pairing of Channing and Stiles [which] creates real dramatic fireworks".

Conversely, in the Portland Mercury, Katia Dunn wrote that while the screenplay is good, "Julia's flatness leaks into every part of the movie" and that her "inability to act" single-handedly dooms the film as unlike her two other movies that year, O and Save the Last Dance, "there are no dance or sex scenes for Julia to fall back on", concluding that the film "should be a lesson about what happens when bad actors try to do arty movies: Disaster" and that "Julia Stiles should stick to what she does best: Nothing".
