= Travelling Salesman (2012 film) =

- Directed by: Timothy Lanzone
- Screenplay by: Andrew Lanzone; Timothy Lanzone
- Produced by: Preston Clay Reed
- Starring: Matt Lagan; Steve West; Danny Barclay; Marc Raymond; Tyler Seiple; David John Cole; Malek Houlihan; Eric Bloom
- Cinematography: Benji Bakshi
- Edited by: Christopher McGlynn
- Music by: Benjamin Krause
- Production company: Fretboard Pictures
- Release date: June 16, 2012
- Country: United States
- Language: English

Travelling Salesman is a 2012 intellectual thriller film about four mathematicians who solve the P versus NP problem, one of the most challenging mathematical problems in history. The title refers to the travelling salesman problem, an optimization problem that acts like a key to solving other difficult mathematical problems. It has been proven that a quick travelling salesman algorithm, if one exists, could be converted into quick algorithms for many other difficult tasks, such as factoring large numbers. Since many cryptographic schemes rely on the difficulty of factoring integers to protect their data, a quick solution would enable access to encrypted private data like personal correspondence, bank accounts and, possibly, government secrets.

The story was written and directed by Timothy Lanzone and premiered at the International House in Philadelphia on June 16, 2012. After screenings in eight countries, spanning four continents, including screenings at the University of Pennsylvania and the University of Cambridge, the film was released globally on September 10, 2013.

== Plot ==
The four mathematicians are gathered and meet with a top official of the United States Department of Defense. After some discussion, the group agrees that they must be wary with whom to trust and control their solution. The official offers them a reward of $10 million in exchange for their portion of the algorithm, swaying them by attempting to address their concerns. Only one of the four speaks out against the sale, and in doing so is forced to reveal a dark truth about his portion of the solution. Before they sign a license to the government, however, they wrestle with the ethical consequences of their discovery.

== Critical reception ==
The film premiered in Philadelphia, Pennsylvania on June 16, 2012, and early reviews were favorable:

"It is a great premise that writers Andy and Timothy Lanzone use to explore the theme of scientific hubris."

"Travelling Salesman’s mathematicians are all too aware of what their work will do to the world, and watching them argue how to handle the consequences offers a thriller far more cerebral than most."

Mathematicians who have discussed the film praised the writer's attempt to bring a serious math problem to the big screen, although they questioned whether the world would be as dramatically affected by its solution:

"Despite our caveat that a solution to [the travelling salesman problem] might not be to die for, let alone to kill for, it would certainly be a huge change in our knowledge of the world. The implications could be unlimited. We certainly hope the movie raises awareness of computer science theory and the life importance of its subject matter."

The film also garnered favorable reviews after the University of Cambridge screening:

"And at the heart of this story was that mathematics now underpins so much of our lives, meaning that mathematical discoveries could have a dramatic impact on the world, leading to new advances or to potential catastrophe and all the moral dilemmas that entails. Perhaps an ethics class, or at least a trip to see this movie, might become an obligatory part of all maths degrees."

== Awards and recognition ==
- 2012 Silicon Valley Film Festival – Best Feature Film, Best Lead Actor (Danny Barclay), Best Editing (Christopher McGlynn) .
- 2012 New York International Film Festival – Official Selection.

== See also ==
- Complexity theory
- List of films about mathematicians
- NP-hardness
- P-hardness
