= The Night Listener (film) =

2006 film by Patrick Stettner

- Theatrical release poster
- Directed by: Patrick Stettner
- Screenplay by: Armistead Maupin; Terry Anderson; Patrick Stettner
- Based on: The Night Listener by Armistead Maupin
- Produced by: Robert Kessel; Jill Footlick; Jeffrey Sharp; John Hart; Armistead Maupin
- Starring: Robin Williams; Toni Collette; Bobby Cannavale; Joe Morton; Rory Culkin; Sandra Oh
- Cinematography: Lisa Rinzler
- Edited by: Andy Keir
- Music by: Peter Nashel
- Production companies: IFC Films; Fortissimo Films
- Distributed by: Miramax Films (North America); Fortissimo Films (Overseas)
- Release dates: January 21, 2006 (Sundance); August 4, 2006 (United States)
- Running time: 81 minutes
- Country: United States
- Language: English
- Budget: $3 million
- Box office: $10.6 million

The Night Listener is a 2006 American psychological thriller film directed by Patrick Stettner and starring Robin Williams. The screenplay by Armistead Maupin, Terry Anderson, and Stettner is based on Maupin's 2000 novel The Night Listener, which was inspired by Anthony Godby Johnson.

== Plot ==
Gabriel Noone, a popular gay New York City radio show host, is dealing with a separation from his partner Jess. Noone is given a memoir written by teenager Pete Logand that chronicles the many years of sexual abuse that he suffered at the hands of his parents and their friends. Diagnosed with AIDS, the youth has been adopted by Donna Logand, the social worker who handled his case.

Noone begins a telephone relationship with the boy and Donna. He and Pete become increasingly close and form a father-son relationship, much to the dismay of Jess, especially after he speaks with Donna and suspects that she is impersonating Pete in some of the telephone conversations. Noone's personal secretary Anna adds fuel to the fire by discussing her research of people who fabricate elaborate stories to get attention.

Determined to prove that the boy exists and that his story is true, Noone decides to pay a surprise visit to Pete in his hometown in rural Wisconsin. Noone discovers that the return address on Pete's correspondence is actually a mail drop. While eating in a local diner, he overhears another patron and recognizes her voice as that of Donna. He is surprised to learn that she is blind and uses a guide dog. Noone follows her home, and Donna senses that he has followed her. She invites him into her home and talks openly about Pete, who she says is currently in the hospital undergoing tests. She assures him that he can visit the boy the following day but suddenly becomes angry and tells him that she will not allow him to meet Pete. Increasingly suspicious, Noone contacts all the hospitals in Madison, the location of the nearest facilities, but none have the boy registered as a patient.

Noone's paranoia about the boy's existence grows, and, hoping to find proof of his existence, he breaks into Donna's home. A police officer arrests him for breaking and entering but, mistakenly believing that Noone is one of the boy's abusers, attacks him with a stun baton before taking him to the station. Noone convinces the police that he meant no harm and is released, finding Donna waiting for him with the news that Pete is dead; also, that he was in a Milwaukee hospital and not in Madison. Distressed that Noone does not believe her, Donna collapses in the middle of a road and tries to hold him with her in the path of an oncoming truck. Donna moves everything out of her home and disappears before the police can question her. Noone is now convinced that the boy is a figment of the deranged woman's imagination.

In response to a phone call from Donna, Noone goes to a motel where she was staying and finds Pete's stuffed rabbit and a videotape under a blanket. He plays the video of a child who seems to be Pete but could be anyone. The phone rings and the caller claims to be the boy (now sounding exactly like Donna) waiting for his mother at the airport. The caller ends the conversation after Noone asks what happened in Donna's past, how she became blind, and suggests that Donna get help. Noone watches the video, deep in thought.

Noone returns to Manhattan and uses his experience to create The Night Listener, a new radio story. In the final scene, Donna is searching for a new home in a coastal town, telling the realtor that she needs it for herself and her son, who has just lost his leg but will be released the next day. She has drastically changed her appearance and no longer has a guide dog nor dark glasses, revealing that her blindness was also an act. Noone concludes his show for the night by saying, "As for Pete, there's a line in The Velveteen Rabbit that reads... Real isn't how you were made. It's the thing that happens to you. I'm Gabriel Noone. Goodnight."

== Cast ==
- Robin Williams as Gabriel Noone
- Toni Collette as Donna Logand
- Rory Culkin as Pete D. Logand
- Bobby Cannavale as Jess
- Sandra Oh as Anna
- Joe Morton as Ashe
- John Cullum as Pap Noone
- Lisa Emery as Darlie Noone
- Becky Ann Baker as Waitress
- Rodrigo Lopresti as Young Man at Party
- Guenia Lemos as Female Neighbor
- Marcia Haufrecht as Pant-Suited Woman (as Marcia Halfrecht)
- Nick Gregory as Flight Attendant
- Ed Jewett as Mail Clerk
- Billy Van as Taxi Driver

== Production ==
In The Night Listener Revealed, a special feature on the film's DVD release, Armistead Maupin discusses the inspiration for his novel. In 1992, the author was sent the manuscript of a memoir allegedly written by fourteen-year-old Anthony Godby Johnson, who had been sexually and physically abused by his parents since childhood. Since the galleys included a foreword by novelist Paul Monette, a close friend of Maupin's, and an afterword by Fred Rogers (of Mister Rogers' Neighborhood), he had no reason to doubt the story's veracity.

Maupin was impressed with the maturity of the boy's writing and called him. The two quickly developed a close telephone relationship, and Maupin frequently discussed the boy's various physical ailments (he had been diagnosed with AIDS) with his adopted mother, Vicki Johnson. Several months later, Maupin's lover Terry Anderson (who co-wrote the screenplay), who had occasionally spoken with the boy, had a conversation with his mother and was struck by how much she and the boy sounded alike. As he became increasingly suspicious about the situation, Maupin became increasingly determined to believe the boy really existed. It was only after Vicki repeatedly prevented him from visiting the boy when Maupin began to think that he was involved in a scam.

Following the publication of the novel, Tad Friend, a friend of Maupin's who wrote for The New Yorker, initiated an investigation. The story was reported by 20/20, which revealed that the photo of "Anthony" that Vicki had sent to Anthony's supporters was a childhood photo of Steve Tarabokija, now a healthy adult and a New Jersey traffic engineer, who was shocked to find his photo being represented to people as the face of Anthony Godby Johnson.

== Release ==
=== Box office ===
The film premiered at the Sundance Film Festival and was shown at the Berlin International Film Festival before opening on 1,367 screens in the US, earning $3,554,134 in its opening weekend. The film went on to gross $7,836,393 domestically, and $2,785,502 in foreign markets, for a total box office of $10,621,895.

=== Critical reception ===
On the review aggregator website Rotten Tomatoes, 40% of 136 critics' reviews are positive, with an average rating of 5.5/10. The website's consensus reads: "This psychological thriller compels by blurring the line between truth and fiction; unfortunately, the film itself gets muddled in a hazy account of Maupin's original novel."

A. O. Scott of The New York Times called the film a "well-meaning, flat-footed screen adaptation [that] has its creepy, suspenseful moments ... but it shrinks a rich, strange story to the dimensions of an anecdote ... the psychological and intellectual implications that hover over the story are lost in the spooky atmospherics and overshadowed by Ms. Collette's off-kilter showboating."

Mick LaSalle of the San Francisco Chronicle described it as "a movie with lots of heart but no heartbeat ... it feels infected by a malaise ... yet the film has intelligence and integrity and cannot be dismissed."

Michael Phillips of the Chicago Tribune said, "It's a small but crafty and well-acted picture ... The pacing and staging of the later scenes could use a little more electricity and momentum and a little less restraint. Yet The Night Listener keeps you watching. And listening."

David Rooney of Variety thought it was "tediously solemn" and a "dawdling mystery thriller [that] manages to flatten two protagonists that had far more depth in the novel ... Lenser Lisa Rinzler gives the film a somber, elegant look, and Peter Nashel's score adds a layer of intensity. But it takes more than a few brooding strings to make a film taut and tense. The pace drags increasingly, trudging through the protracted final reels to a clumsy wrap-up with too many concluding scenes, none of them effective."
