= Nicholas Nickleby (2002 film) =

- Theatrical release poster
- Directed by: Douglas McGrath
- Screenplay by: Douglas McGrath
- Based on: The Life and Adventures of Nicholas Nickleby by Charles Dickens
- Produced by: John Hart; Jeffrey Sharp; Simon Channing Williams
- Starring: Jamie Bell; Jim Broadbent; Tom Courtenay; Alan Cumming; Edward Fox; Romola Garai; Anne Hathaway; Barry Humphries; Charlie Hunnam; Nathan Lane; Christopher Plummer; Timothy Spall; Juliet Stevenson
- Narrated by: Nathan Lane
- Cinematography: Dick Pope
- Edited by: Lesley Walker
- Music by: Rachel Portman
- Production companies: Hart-Sharp Entertainment; Potboiler Productions; United Artists
- Distributed by: MGM Distribution Co. (United States and Canada); 20th Century Fox (International)
- Release dates: 27 December 2002 (US); 27 June 2003 (UK)
- Running time: 132 minutes
- Countries: United Kingdom; United States
- Language: English
- Budget: $10 million
- Box office: $3.7 million

Nicholas Nickleby is a 2002 period comedy-drama film written and directed by Douglas McGrath. The screenplay is based on The Life and Adventures of Nicholas Nickleby by Charles Dickens, which originally was published in serial form between March 1838 and September 1839. Charlie Hunnam stars in the title role alongside Nathan Lane, Jim Broadbent, Christopher Plummer, Jamie Bell, Anne Hathaway, Romola Garai, Alan Cumming, and Timothy Spall.

== Plot ==
A prologue introduces the Nicklebys, country gentry who enjoy a comfortable life in the Devon countryside until the father dies and leaves his family with no source of income. Nineteen-year-old Nicholas, his mother, and his younger sister, Kate, venture to London to seek help from their wealthy, cold-hearted uncle Ralph, an investor who arranges for Nicholas to be hired as a tutor at Dotheboys Hall in Yorkshire and finds Kate work as a seamstress.

Nicholas is horrified to discover his employers, the sadistic Mr and Mrs Squeers, run their boarding school like a prison and physically, verbally, and emotionally abuse their young charges on a regular basis. He eventually rebels and escapes, taking with him the crippled young servant boy Smike. As they journey to London, they stumble upon a theatrical troupe owned and operated by Mr and Mrs Crummles. They cast them in a production of Romeo and Juliet, but despite a successful first night and the couple's invitation to stay, Nicholas is determined to continue their journey to London after hearing that Kate is in trouble.

Nicholas discovers his sister has been subjected to humiliating sexual harassment from the lecherous Sir Mulberry Hawk, a client of their uncle, who has encouraged the man to seduce his niece in the hope that she will succumb and thus cement Hawk's business relationship with him. Nicholas confronts Sir Mulberry and his uncle, renouncing the latter.

Nicholas is reunited with his family, who welcome Smike as one of their own, and finds clerical employment with the kindly Cheeryble brothers, who offer him more than double his previous salary. While thus employed, Nicholas makes the acquaintance of Madeline Bray, an artist who financially supports both herself and her tyrannical father, as her father gambled away his fortune and that of his late wife.

Nicholas' determination to defend his sister's honour leads his uncle to vow he will destroy the young man. What ensues is a series of adventures in which the upstanding Nicholas manages to survive the schemes of his evil uncle, which includes an attempt by him to return Smike to Squeers by kidnapping him and an effort to abort Nicholas' growing relationship with Madeline by promising her father he will excuse his debts if the girl weds Hawk. Ralph's designs on Madeline are thwarted when her father dies unexpectedly. Unfortunately, Smike falls ill and then dies. Soon after, a sinister secret Ralph has harbored for years surfaces, and it is revealed that Smike was Ralph's son, whom he had thought dead. Realizing that his son had died whilst being the best friend of his most hated enemy, Ralph hangs himself. Kate marries the Cheeryble brothers' nephew Frank, while Nicholas marries Madeline and settles with her in Devon at his father's house and estate where Smike is also buried.

== Cast ==
- Charlie Hunnam as Nicholas Nickleby
- Nathan Lane as Vincent Crummles
- Jim Broadbent as Wackford Squeers
- Christopher Plummer as Ralph Nickleby
- Jamie Bell as Smike
- Anne Hathaway as Madeline Bray
- Alan Cumming as Mr. Folair
- Timothy Spall as Charles Cheeryble
- Tom Courtenay as Newman Noggs, Ralph Nickleby's factotum
- Juliet Stevenson as Mrs. Squeers
- Romola Garai as Kate Nickleby
- Stella Gonet as Catherine Nickleby
- Heather Goldenhersh as Fanny Squeers
- Barry Humphries as Mrs. Crummles/Mr. Leadville
- Gerard Horan as Ned Cheeryble
- William Ash as Frank Cheeryble
- Edward Fox as Sir Mulberry Hawk
- David Bradley as Mr. Nigel Bray
- Phil Davis as Brooker
- Kevin McKidd as John Browdie
- Nicholas Rowe as Lord Verisopht
- Sophie Thompson as Miss Lacreevy
- Andrew Havill as Mr. Nickleby
- Angus Wright as Mr Pluck

== Production ==
In Creating a Classic: The Making of Nicholas Nickleby, a bonus feature on the film's DVD release, screenwriter/director Douglas McGrath and his cast and crew discuss the development of the project. The positive audience reaction to a stage reading of the screenplay in a theater in lower Manhattan, which included a number of actors who eventually were cast in the film, convinced McGrath to proceed with the movie. At the request of production designer Eve Stewart, he advanced the time frame from the 1830s to the 1850s so she could incorporate elements of the Industrial Revolution into her design plans.

Jamie Bell's audition for the role of Smike in a London hotel room left McGrath and the producers in tears, and they cast him on the spot. While considering Mrs. Crummles, a smug, opinionated, but lovable dowager, McGrath realized all her traits and characteristics were embodied by Dame Edna Everage, alter ego of actor Barry Humphries, but was hesitant to suggest casting a male in the role. The producers, however, agreed Humphries was an ideal choice. He also played the part of Mr. Leadville in the same sequence. Nicholas was one of the last roles to be cast. Charlie Hunnam had been sent the script, but several months passed before he had an opportunity to read it. He met with McGrath, and based on a couple of hours of conversation with the actor, the director felt he finally had found the right man for the part. Ironically, the British Hunnam had to work with a dialect coach; having lived and worked in the US for the past several years, he had perfected an American accent in order to ensure regular employment.

Costume designer Ruth Myers opted to dress two of the leading characters in clothing pre-dating the period in which the film is set. This portrayed Nicholas, as the newly-anointed head of his family, wearing clothing inherited from his father, and the impoverished Madeline's dresses were hand-me-downs from her mother.

Locations used in the film included the abandoned 19th century Gibson Mill in Hardcastle Crags; Hebden Bridge in West Yorkshire; Churchill College at the University of Cambridge; and Wilton's Music Hall, the Old Vic, the Reform Club, Leighton House and One, Aldwych in London. Interiors were filmed in Elstree Studios in Borehamwood and Three Mills Studios in the East End of London.

== Release ==
=== Critical response ===
The film received positive reviews from critics. Review aggregator Rotten Tomatoes reports that 79% out of 127 professional critics gave the film a positive review, with a rating average of 6.8/10 and the critical consensus being: "Thanks to a strong cast of experienced actors and director Douglas McGrath's steady hand, Nicholas Nickleby is a worthy and respectful adaptation of the Dickens novel." Metacritic, which uses a weighted average, assigned the film a score of 71 out of 100, based on 32 critics, indicating "generally favorable" reviews.

In his review in The New York Times, A. O. Scott called the film "two hours of swift, engaging entertainment" and added, "The book's theme and spirit have been dutifully respected. No, what Mr. McGrath has done with admirable modesty is better than that. Rather than trying to update, transform or otherwise interpret Nickleby, he has decided to share his enthusiasm for it ... [He] has adapted [Dickens' dialogue] with a scholar's ear and a showman's flair ... [and] produced a colorful, affecting collage of Dickensian moods and motifs, a movie that elicits an overwhelming desire to plunge into 900 pages of 19th-century prose."

Roger Ebert of the Chicago Sun-Times said, "The movie is jolly and exciting and brimming with life, and wonderfully well-acted."

In the San Francisco Chronicle, Mick LaSalle observed, "It took Dickens 65 chapters, and it took the famous stage production eight hours to tell the story of Nicholas Nickleby. But in the new movie, writer-director Douglas McGrath manages to tell it all in 132 minutes, without the story ever seeming rushed or curtailed. Instead, the impression is one of abundance: It's a generous tale, told through big performances by a talented cast."

Peter Travers of Rolling Stone awarded the film three out of a possible four stars and commented, "Christopher Plummer steals the show without resorting to camp as Nicholas' wounded and wounding Uncle Ralph. It's a great performance and a reminder of Dickens' grandeur. This CliffsNotes of a film, though lively fun, only hints at that. No matter. I'll take the hint."

In Variety, David Rooney described the film as "a delightful experience. The sacrifices of condensing Dickens' massive novel to standard feature length are discernible, especially in the title character's discovery of love. But while it's told in conventional fashion, the heart of this tale of a young man's quest to rescue his family from villainy and misfortune is lovingly rendered by a mostly superlative cast and with an entertaining balance of humour and pathos . . . McGrath's approach is old-fashioned but appealing, using a novelistic style that relies on voiceover to get through much of the initial exposition. His script captures the scope, humour and compassion of Dickens' novel and drives the picaresque story along at a lively clip."

=== Box office ===
The film grossed $1,587,173 in the U.S. and $2,064,289 in foreign markets for a total worldwide box office of $3,651,462, against a budget of $10 Million.

== Awards and nominations ==
The film was nominated for the Golden Globe Award for Best Motion Picture - Musical or Comedy. It received the National Board of Review Award for Best Cast, and Romola Garai was nominated for the Jameson People's Choice Award for Best European Actress at the European Film Awards.
