= Patrick Stettner =

American film director and writer

Patrick Stettner is an American film director and writer. His first film, Flux, was released in 1996 as a short, and starred Allison Janney in an early role. He went on to direct and write the screenplay for The Business of Strangers in 2001, which earned him a Grand Jury Prize nomination at the Sundance Film Festival of that year and earned lead actress Stockard Channing an AFI nomination for Best Female Actress. In 2006, he then wrote and directed The Night Listener, an adaptation of Armistead Maupin's eponymous semi-autobiographical 2000 novel, which landed less-than-stellar reviews from critics. He has not directed any films since The Night Listener

He is an alumnus of Columbia University School of the Arts' film division. He is currently an associate professor of film making at Rutgers University in New Jersey.

== Awards and nominations ==
Year	Festival	Category	Nominated work	Result
1996	Palm Springs International Festival of Short Films	Student Award: Best Drama	Flux	Won
1996	Palm Springs International Festival of Short Films	Student Award: Best Student Film	Flux	Won
1997	Uppsala International Short Film Festival	Film Jackdaw: Best Short Fiction Film A (under 20 minutes)	Flux	Won
2001	Sundance Film Festival	Grand Jury Prize: Dramatic	The Business of Strangers	Nominated
2001	San Francisco International Film Festival	SKYY Prize	The Business of Strangers	Won
2001	Deauville American Film Festival	Grand Special Prize	The Business of Strangers	Nominated
2001	Stockholm International Film Festival	Bronze Horse	The Business of Strangers	Nominated
2002	Paris Film Festival	Grand Prix	The Business of Strangers	Nominated
2002	Paris Film Festival	Special Jury Prize	The Business of Strangers	Won
