= George Csicsery =

Director and filmmaker

- Born: March 17, 1948; Regensburg, West Germany
- Education: UC Berkeley (BA); San Francisco State University (MFA)
- Occupations: filmmaker; producer; writer
- Known for: N is a Number and other documentary films
- Website: zalafilms.com

George Paul Csicsery (born March 17, 1948) is a Hungarian-American writer and independent filmmaker who has directed 35 films including performance films, dramatic shorts and documentaries. He is best known for his documentaries about mathematicians and mathematical communities.

== Life and career ==
George Csicsery was born in Regensburg, Germany to Hungarian parents who had fled their native country after WWII (his father was a monarchist army officer). In 1951, the family emigrated to Cleveland, Ohio. After a series of menial jobs his father became a successful stained glass and enamel artist and his mother became head of the slide library at the Cleveland Museum of Art (CMA), and assistant to renowned Asian art historian, Sherman Lee.

George obtained a BA in Comparative Religion from UC Berkeley (1969), and an MFA in Film Production from San Francisco State University (1972).

He taught film editing at Film Arts Foundation in San Francisco from 1982 to 1997, and general cinema courses to undergraduates at San Francisco State University in 1996 and at UC Davis in 1998.

He once said, "I am interested in people who can find happiness in creating their own world. That is true of mathematicians and romance writers. These people are creating universes different from where they live." In 2009 he received the Joint Policy Board for Mathematics (JPBM) Communications Award for his work showing the process of mathematical thinking through the medium of film.

Csicsery has written about the difficulties of being a displaced person after WWII, and about his two brothers−one of whom fought in the Hungarian Revolution.

== Reception ==
Writing in Nature Magazine Davide Castelvecchi said, "Csicsery has carved a niche as a maker of compelling films about mathematicians". Beginning in March 2022, as part of the celebration of Women's History Month, Secrets of the Surface: The Mathematical Vision of Maryam Mirzakhani will be shown on more than 300 PBS stations.

== Filmography ==
- Songs Along A Stony Road (co-directed with Chris Teerink), about Zoltán Kallós and folk musicians of Transylvania (2011)
- The Thursday Club, about a gathering of retired Oakland Police Department officers (2005)
- Hungry for Monsters, about false memory, focusing on Nicole Althaus's disproved allegations of sexual abuse against her father (2003)
- Where the Heart Roams, about The Love Train, a rail voyage from Los Angeles to the Romantic Book Lovers Conference in New York City (1987)
- Hookers, about sex worker activist Margo St. James (1975)

=== Films about mathematicians and mathematics ===
Much of Csicsery's work since the early 1990s has been about eminent mathematicians or the mathematics community in general. These include:

- Secrets of the Surface: The Mathematical Vision of Maryam Mirzakhani (2020)
- Navajo Math Circles (2016)
- Counting from Infinity: Yitang Zhang and the Twin Prime Conjecture (2015)
- Taking the Long View: The Life of Shiing-shen Chern (2010)
- I Want To Be A Mathematician: A Conversation with Paul Halmos (2009)
- Julia Robinson and Hilbert's Tenth Problem (2008)
- Hard Problems: The Road to the World's Toughest Math Contest (2008)
- N is a Number: A Portrait of Paul Erdős (1993)

He worked with Scott Kim and Karl Schaffer to produce a series of films about string polyhedra and other recreational math topics.
