= The Night Listener (novel) =

2000 novel by Armistead Maupin

- Author: Armistead Maupin
- Language: English
- Genre: Novel
- Published: 2000 (HarperCollins)
- Publication place: United States
- Media type: Print (hardback & paperback)
- ISBN: 0-06-017143-X
- OCLC: 43864360

The Night Listener is a 2000 roman à clef by Armistead Maupin. The novel's plot is based on the author's interaction with Anthony Godby Johnson, the purported author of a book, A Rock and a Hard Place: One Boy's Triumphant Story, both before and after Anthony is suspected of being a hoax.

== Plot summary ==
Gabriel Noone is a gay writer whose late-night radio stories have brought him into the homes of millions. Noone has recently separated from Jess, his partner of ten years. Noone's publisher sends him the galleys of a memoir apparently written by a 13-year-old boy, Peter Lomax. The author claims to have been the victim of sexual abuse and infected with HIV.

According to his memoir, his father started beating him at two and raped him at four; his mother videotaped the "sessions". When he was eight years old, his parents started pimping him and selling videotapes. When Pete was age 11, he ran away with the pornographic tapes, and his parents were jailed. A psychologist named Donna Lomax took the boy in and eventually adopted him.

Noone contacts the boy and they start exchanging a series of phone calls that develop into a kind of father/son relationship. He begins to suspect that Pete does not exist and that he and his memoir are fabrications by Donna. Even a visit to their home is inconclusive, and the novel ends with Gabriel feeling that the value of the relationship to him is more important than whether or not Pete is real.

Subplots in the novel revolve around Gabriel's relationships with his lover and his father. Important themes are the nature of father/son relationships, the power struggle involved in caring for and being cared for by another, the embellishment of truth, and the secrets we keep even in the most intimate relationships.

== Film, TV or theatrical adaptations ==
- The novel was adapted into a 2006 film starring Robin Williams, which was co-written by Maupin, Terry Anderson and director Patrick Stettner.
- "Faith", a 2002 episode of the television series Law & Order: Criminal Intent, borrowed heavily from the book's plot.

== See also ==
- Kaycee Nicole
- James Frey
