= Augusta University Building =

Bank building in Augusta, Georgia, US

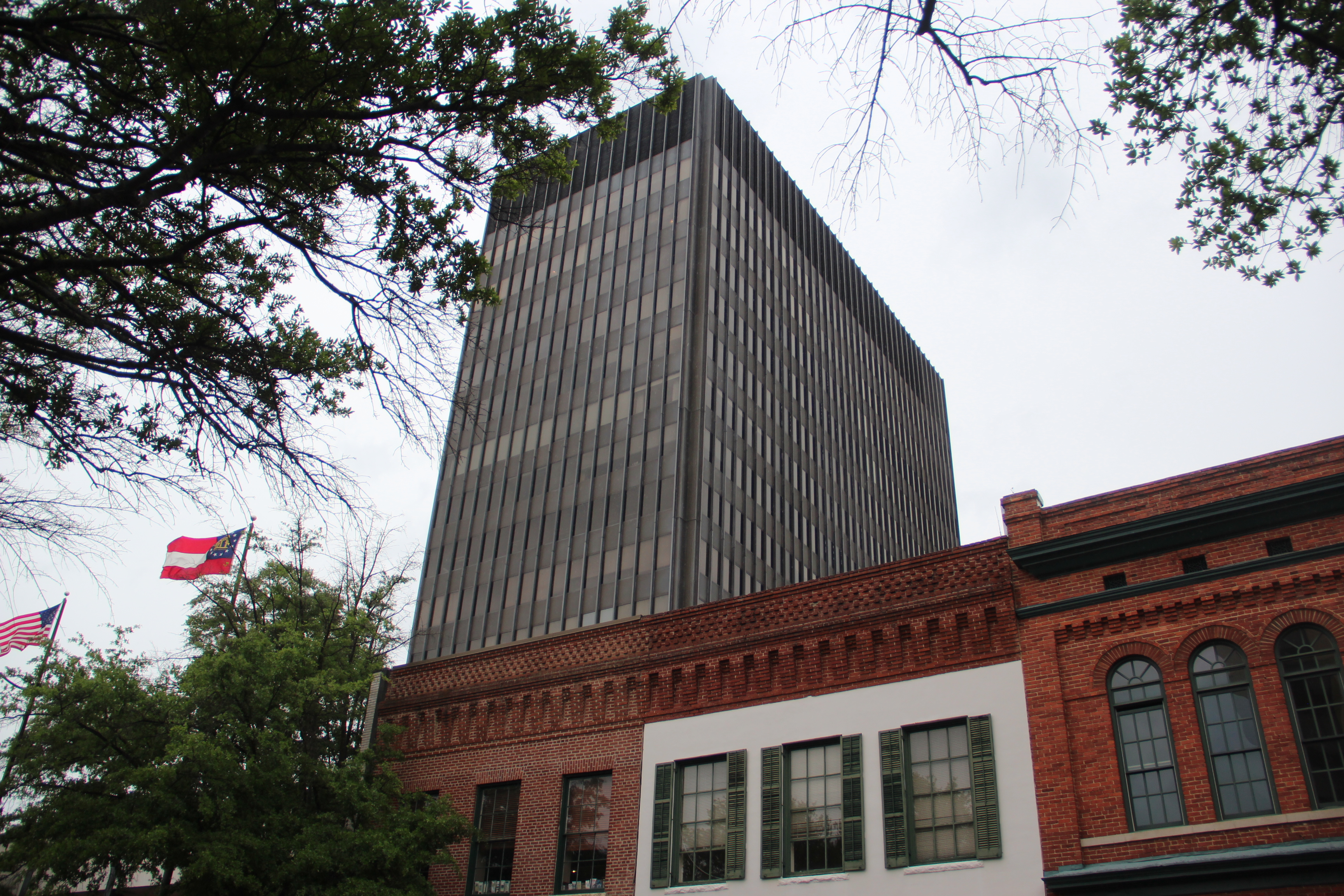
- Augusta University Building in 2017
- Interactive map of the Augusta University Building area

General information
- Type: Commercial/financial
- Location: 699 Broad Street, Augusta, Georgia, U.S.
- Coordinates: 33.47507°N 81.96277°W
- Construction started: 1965
- Completed: 1967

Height
- Roof: 220 ft (67 m)

Technical details
- Floor count: 17
- Floor area: 170,000 sf

Design and construction
- Architect: Robert McCreary
- Developer: Robert McCreary and William Hughes

The Augusta University Building, formerly known as the Wells Fargo Building and Georgia Railroad Bank Building, is a commercial and financial skyscraper in Augusta, Georgia, in the United States. After its completion, the building was the tallest building in Augusta from 1967 to 1976, when the Lamar Building surpassed it due to the completion of the penthouse. Today, it is the third tallest building in the city. The building's exterior surface is made completely in aluminum steel glass.

The Pinnacle Club, a member-based restaurant, has continuously operated on the 16th and 17th floors since the building's opening in 1967.

== History ==
The building was planned in 1965 by Georgia Railroad Bank & Trust. When announced, the structure planned to be 14 storeys tall and cost of $5 million. Robert McCreary designed the building, which has been described as having a "Miesian" architectural style, after the prominent architect Ludwig Mies van der Rohe who championed glass curtain buildings. The building opened with 170,000 square feet of space. The building displaced the Town Tavern, a restaurant famous for serving golfers during the Masters Tournament, which moved and closed in 1993.

The building was purchased in 1986 by First Union Bank, which changed the building's name.

In 2003, the building's name was changed to the Wachovia Bank Center, making it the official headquarters of Wachovia in the eastern part of Georgia and the Central Savannah River Area. In 2008, the building's name was changed again to the Wells Fargo Building and was the official headquarters of Wells Fargo in the Augusta region.

Augusta University's health department bought the naming rights in 2017 after leasing two floors of the building.

Part of the film Agent Game were filmed at the building.
