= John Hart (producer) =

American film and theater producer

John N. Hart Jr. is an American film and theater producer best known for his work on Once (2012 winner of eight Tony Awards, including Best Musical), The Band's Visit (2018 winner of ten Tony Awards, including Best Musical), Boys Don't Cry), You Can Count on Me and Revolutionary Road. His productions have garnered him five personal Tony Awards for Best Production.

Hart is founder and President of Evamere Entertainment, LLC, a New York City-based independent film and theatrical production company founded in 2007. Current and recent projects include Just In Time (2025) The Band's Visit (2017), A Bronx Tale (2016), The Glass Menagerie (2013), and Once (2012).

Before founding Evamere, Hart was a founding partner and President of Hart Sharp Entertainment, Inc., a New York City-based independent film and theatre production company. Additionally, Hart co-founded Smuggler Films in 2009.

During his tenure at Hart Sharp, Hart produced 11 films and managed two private equity funds with an aggregate capital commitment of $20 million. He has produced 16 feature films including the critically acclaimed Boys Don't Cry, You Can Count on Me and Revolutionary Road.

Other Broadway credits include Guys & Dolls, The Who's Tommy, Hamlet with Ralph Fiennes, How to Succeed in Business Without Really Trying starring Matthew Broderick, Annie Get Your Gun starring Bernadette Peters and the revival of Chicago.

Hart is a graduate of Dartmouth College.

== Films ==
- Nighthawks (2018)
- Greetings from Tim Buckley (2012)
- Revolutionary Road (2008)
- The Night Listener (2006)
- Proof (2005)
- P.S. (2004)
- Home at the End of the World (2004)
- Undefeated (2003)
- Nicholas Nickleby (2002)
- Lift (2001)
- You Can Count on Me (2000)
- Boys Don't Cry (1999)
- Dark Harbor (1998)
- Arresting Gena (1997)
- Office Killer (1997)
- Safe (1995)
- Drunks (1995)

== Theater productions ==
- Just in Time (2025)
- The Band's Visit (2017)
- A Bronx Tale (2016)
- The Glass Menagerie (2013)
- Once (2012)
- Seminar (2012)
- Annie Get Your Gun (1999)
- Chicago (1996)
- Hamlet (1995)
- How to Succeed in Business Without Really Trying (1995)
- The Who's Tommy (1993)
- Guys and Dolls (1992)
- Leader of the Pack (1985)
- Onward Victoria (1980)
- Eubie! The Musical (1978)
