= Adam Coleman Howard =

American actor

- Born: United States
- Occupations: Actor, film director, screenwriter
- Years active: 1986-present
- Parent: Margo Howard

Adam Coleman Howard is an American actor, screenwriter, and film director. He is the son of advice columnist Margo Howard, the grandson of advice columnist Ann Landers and the stepson of actor Ken Howard.

== Filmography ==
Adam Coleman Howard film and television credits
Year	Title	Role	Notes	Ref.
1986	Quiet Cool	Joshua Greer	Film directed by Clay Borris	
1988	Midnightmare	Unknown	Film. Director	
1989	Slaves of New York	Stash	Film directed by James Ivory	
1989	The Equalizer	Willie Halsey	Episode: "Suicide Squad" (Directed by Marc Laub)	
1990	Pacific Palisades	Ben	Film directed by Bernard Schmitt	
1991	No Secrets	Manny	Film directed by Dezsö Magyar	
1994	Ride Me	Adolpho Frenzy	Film directed by Bashar Shbib	
1996	Dead Girl	Ari Rose	Film; Also writer and director	
1998	Dark Harbor	No	Film. Writer and director	
2002	Refuge	No	Film. Associate producer. Directed by Narain Jashanmal	
