= Richard Kind filmography =

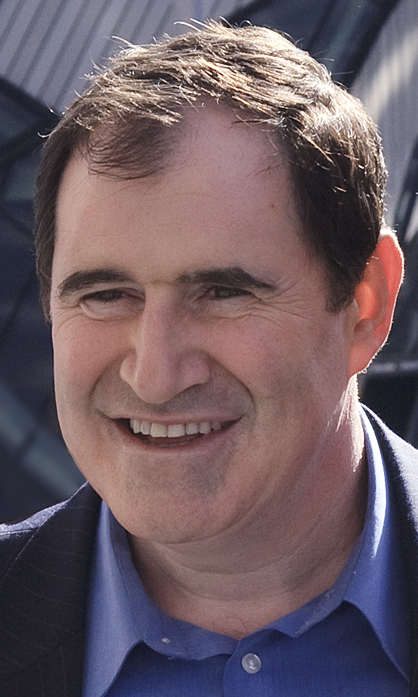
Kind in 2009

Richard Kind is an American actor, known for his roles as Dr. Mark Devanow in Mad About You (1992–1999, 2019), Paul Lassiter in Spin City (1996–2002), Andy in Curb Your Enthusiasm (2002–2021), and Arthur in A Serious Man (2009). Kind is also known for his voice performances in various Pixar films such as A Bug's Life (1998), the first two films of the Cars franchise (2006–2011), Toy Story 3 (2010), and Inside Out (2015). He was nominated for a Tony Award for Best Featured Actor in a Play for his performance as Marcus Hoff in the 2013 Broadway production of The Big Knife.

== Film ==
Year	Title	Role	Notes
1986	Nothing in Common	Ad Exec in Bar	Uncredited
1988	Vice Versa	Floyd	
1991	Queens Logic	Actor	
1991	Ghoulies Go to College	Cat Ghoulie (voice)	
1991	All-American Murder	Lou Alonzo	
1992	Mr. Saturday Night	Reporter	
1992	Tom and Jerry: The Movie	Tom (voice)	
1993	Quest of the Delta Knights	Wamthool	
1994	Jimmy Hollywood	Angry Driver	
1994	Clifford	Julien Daniels	
1994	Stargate	Gary Meyers, Ph.D.	
1996	Johns	Paul Truman	
1997	Hacks	Benny	
1997	Cold Around the Heart	Attorney Nabbish	
1998	The Jungle Book: Mowgli's Story	Chimpanzee (voice)	
1998	A Bug's Life	Molt (voice)	
1999	Our Friend, Martin	Mr. Willis (voice)	
2000	Tom Sawyer	Mr. Dobbins (voice)	
2002	Quicksand	Kensington	
2002	Confessions of a Dangerous Mind	Casting Executive Man	
2003	The Station Agent	Louis Tiboni	
2004	Garfield: The Movie	Dad Rat (voice)	
2004	Elvis Has Left the Building	Burning Elvis	
2005	Bewitched	Abner Kravitz	
2005	The Producers	Jury Foreman	
2006	Spymate	Dr. Farley	
2006	Cars	Van (voice)	
2006	The Wild	Larry (voice)	
2006	I Want Someone to Eat Cheese With	Herb Hope	
2006	For Your Consideration	Marketing Person	
2006	Everyone's Hero	Hobo Andy, Maitre D' (voice)	
2006	Raising Flagg	Bill Reed	
2007	The Grand	Andy Andrews	
2007	The Visitor	Jacob	
2007	National Lampoon's Bag Boy	Dave Weiner	
2007	Big Stan	Mal	
2008	Dr. Dolittle: Tail to the Chief	Groundhog (voice)	
2008	The Understudy	Ian	
2008	Roadside Romeo	Guru (voice)	Uncredited
2009	Ingenious	Newkin	
2009	A Serious Man	Uncle Arthur	
2009	Heidi 4 Paws	Grandfather (voice)	
2009	Santa Buddies	Eddy the Elf Dog (voice)	
2010	Toy Story 3	Bookworm (voice)	
2010	Hereafter	Christos	
2010	The Search for Santa Paws	Eddy the Elf Dog (voice)	
2011	Fancypants	Mr. Camp	
2011	Cars 2	Van (voice)	
2012	Argo	Max Klein	
2012	Divorce Invitation	George Mason	
2012	Santa Paws 2: The Santa Pups	Eddy the Elf Dog (voice)	
2013	Dealin' with Idiots	Harold	
2014	Obvious Child	Jacob	
2014	Chu and Blossom	Fred	
2014	The Angriest Man in Brooklyn	Bix Field	
2014	Yellowbird	Michka (voice)	English version
2014	Ride	Boss	
2015	Inside Out	Bing Bong (voice)	
2015	The Lennon Report	Dr. Stephan G. Lynn	
2015	Detours	Sam Jacobson	
2016	The Paper Store	Professor Marty Kane	
2016	All We Had	Marty	
2017	Suburbicon	John Sears	
2017	Bernard and Huey	Marty	
2018	The Independents	Granny	
2019	The Last Laugh	Jimbo	
2019	Bombshell	Rudy Giuliani	
2020	Ella Bella Bingo	Mr. Jackson (voice)	English version
2020	Rifkin's Festival	Mr. Rifkin	
2020	The Stand In	Wes	
2021	Extinct	Wally (voice)	
2021	Tick, Tick... Boom!	Walter Bloom	
2021	18½	Jack	
2022	The Ray	Grayson	
2022	Tankhouse	Morten	
2023	Beau Is Afraid	Dr. Cohen	
2023	The Out-Laws	Neil Browning	
2023	Monsters of California	Dr. Walker	
2024	Wolfs	Kid's Dad	
2026	Gail Daughtry and the Celebrity Sex Pass		
2026	Homebody	Larry	
2026	Hershey †	Joseph Royer	Post-production
	Not Dead Yet	Elliot Kelman	

== Television ==
Year	Title	Role	Notes
1985	Two Fathers' Justice	District Attorney Turpin	Television film
1987	Hooperman	Reindeer	Episode: "Deck the Cell with Bars of Folly"
1987	Bennett Brothers	Richard Bennett	Television film
1988	My Sister Sam	Lang	Episode: "The Art of Love"
1988	Mr. Belvedere	Joe	Episode: "Marsha's Secret"
1989	Empty Nest	Elton Sexton	Episode: "A Life in the Day"
1989	Unsub	Jimmy Bello	8 episodes
1989	21 Jump Street	Caller (voice)	Episode: "Next Victim"
1989	Anything but Love	Bradley	Episode: "Just the Facts, Ma'am"
1990–1991	Carol & Company	Various characters	33 episodes
1991	Princesses	Len Kleckner	Episode: "Someday My Prince Will Gum"
1991	The Carol Burnett Show	Various characters	7 episodes
1992	Stand By Your Man	Larson	Episode: "Spare Me"
1992	Great Scott!	Alberts	Episode: "Choir Mire"
1992–1999, 2019	Mad About You	Dr. Mark Devanow	45 episodes
1993	The Building	The Neurotic Director	Episode: "Father Knows Best"
1993–1995	The Commish	Alex Beebee	6 episodes
1994	The Nanny	Jeffrey Needleman	Episode: "The Playwright"
1994	Blue Skies	Kenny	8 episodes
1995	A Whole New Ballgame	Dwight Kling	8 episodes
1995	Nowhere Man	Max Webb	Episode: "The Spider Webb"
1996	Space: Above and Beyond	Colonel Matthew Burke	Episode: "Level of Necessity"
1996	Madness of Method	Owen Goodwin	Television short
1996–2002	Spin City	Paul Lassiter	125 episodes
1998	Something So Right	Paul	Episode: "Something About the 'Men' in Menstruation"
1998	The Lionhearts	Additional characters (voice)	Episode: "Singin' in the Mane"
1999	Strangers with Candy	Harry Link, DDS	Episode: "Who Wants Cake?"
1999	The Wild Thornberrys	Lyrebird (voice)	Episode: "Koality and Kuantity"
1999	America's Funniest Home Videos:Unwrapped for the Holidays"	Himself (host)	Television special
2001	Even Stevens	Uncle Chuck Stevens	Episode: "Uncle Chuck"
2001	The Santa Claus Brothers	Roy Claus (voice)	Television film
2001–2002	Oswald	Pongo (voice)	6 episodes
2001–2004	Lloyd in Space	Vice Principal Feely (voice)	5 episodes
2002–2003	Still Standing	Dr. Nathan Gerber	2 episodes
2002–2021	Curb Your Enthusiasm	Cousin Andy	8 episodes
2003	Just Shoot Me!	Jimmie Korsh	Episode: "The Last Temptation of Elliot"
2003	Miss Match	Phil Weston	Episode: "Kate in Ex-tasy"
2003–2004	Scrubs	Harvey Corman	4 episodes
2003, 2007	Kim Possible	Frugal Lucre (voice)	5 episodes
2004	Girlfriends	Peter Miller	Episode: "Prophet & Loss"
2004	Oliver Beene	Barnaby Rollins	Episode: "X-ray Specs"
2004	The Division	Hicks	Episode: "Lost and Found"
2004	My Life, Inc.	Dan Mannion	Television film
2004	That '70s Show	Kimberly's Dad	Episode: "(I Can't Get No) Satisfaction"
2004	Less than Perfect	Lance Corcoran	Episode: "Shoo-In"
2004	Father of the Pride	Zebra (voice)	2 episodes
2004–2008	Go Baby!	Narrator (voice)	
2005	Head Cases	Lou Albertini	Episode: "S(elf) Help"
2005	Genetically Challenged	Shermie Frankl	Television film
2005	E-Ring	Asst. Public Affairs Sec. Danton Murphy	2 episodes
2005	Reba	David	Episode: "Issues"
2005, 2013	Sesame Street	Fairy Balloon Person, Mr. Disgracey	2 episodes
2005–present	American Dad!	Al Tuttle (voice)	
2006	Three Moons Over Milford	Pete Watson	Episode: "Dog Day Aftermoon"
2006	Stargate Atlantis	Lucius Lavin	2 episodes
2006	The Angriest Man in Suburbia	Josh	Television film
2007	Law & Order: Criminal Intent	Ernest Foley	Episode: "Privilege"
2007	Psych	Hugo	Episode: "From the Earth to Starbucks"
2007	All of Us	Dennis	2 episodes
2007	Two and a Half Men	Artie	Episode: "Is There a Mrs. Waffles?"
2007	Sands of Oblivion	Ira	Television film
2009	Chowder	Gumbo (voice)	Episode: "The Deadly Maze"
2009	Dora the Explorer	Greedy King (voice)	Episode: "Dora Saves the Crystal Kingdom"
2009	Sherri	Whiny Neighbor	Episode: "Indecision '09"
2009–2011	The Penguins of Madagascar	Roger (voice)	6 episodes
2010	Leverage	Mayor Bradford Culpepper III	2 episodes
2010	Trauma	Ira	Episode: "Frequent Fliers"
2010	'Til Death	Charlie	Episode: "Brother's Keeper"
2010	Burn Notice	Marv	3 episodes
2011	Harry's Law	Marty Slumach	Episode: "Send in the Clowns"
2011	Mr. Sunshine	Rod McDaniel	2 episodes
2011	Femme Fatales	Jonathan Shields	Episode: "Behind Locked Doors, Part 1"
2011	Phineas and Ferb	Executive (voice)	Episode: "Perry the Actorpus"
2011–2012	Luck	Joey Rathburn	9 episodes
2012	Sketchy	Lord Arby	Episode: "Downtown Arby's"
2012	NYC 22	Geoff Arnhauldt	Episode: "Thugs and Lovers"
2012–2019	Law & Order: Special Victims Unit	Various	4 episodes
2013	Kroll Show	Mark	Episode: "Can I Finish?"
2013	Golden Boy	Paul Daly	3 episodes
2013	Childrens Hospital	Marvin	Episode: "Country Weekend"
2013	Drop Dead Diva	Marty Frumm	Episode: "One Shot"
2013	Dark Minions	Feldenbaum	Television film
2013	The Good Wife	Judge Alan Davies	Episode: "The Next Day"
2014	The Michael J. Fox Show	Mr. Norwood	Episode: "Secret"
2014	Ten X Ten	Man 50s	Miniseries
2014	Bad Teacher	Brie's Husband	Episode: "Pilot"
2014	Glee	Mr. Rifkin	Episode: "The Back-Up Plan"
2014	Sharknado 2: The Second One	Harland 'The Blaster' McGuinness	Television film
2014	TripTank	Dad, Stanley (voice)	2 episodes
2014	The Middle	Dr. Niller	Episode: "Unbraceable You"
2014–2015	Randy Cunningham: 9th Grade Ninja	Mort Weinerman (voice)	4 episodes
2014–2017	Red Oaks	Sam Myers	24 episodes
2014–2019	Gotham	Mayor Aubrey James	13 episodes
2015	What's Your Emergency	Devon Micketty	Episode: "Let's Make a Date"
2015	Unbreakable Kimmy Schmidt	Mr. Lefkovitz	Episode: "Kimmy Goes to School!"
2015	Love Is Dead	Ken Bell	Television film
2015	Happyish	Moses	Episode: "Starring Helen Keller, Moses and Lenny Bruce"
2015	Survivor's Remorse	Ira Irwin	Episode: "M.V.P."
2016	Elementary	Trent Garby	Episode: "A Study in Charlotte"
2016–2017	Lego Star Wars: The Freemaker Adventures	Imperial Officer General Durpin (voice)	7 episodes
2017	Jeff & Some Aliens	Stanley (voice)	5 episodes
2017	Man Seeking Woman	God	Episode: "Blood"
2017	Still the King	Walt's Dad	Episode: "Flatbushes"
2017	Disjointed	Special Agent Schwartz	Episode: "The Worst"
2017	I'm Dying Up Here	Marty Dansak	5 episodes
2017	The Librarians	Bennie Konopka	Episode: "And the Steal of Fortune"
2017–2018	Elena of Avalor	Cucahute (voice)	2 episodes
2017–2019	Welcome to the Wayne	Harvey Timbers (voice)	5 episodes
2017–2020	Rapunzel's Tangled Adventure	Uncle Monty (voice)	10 episodes
2017–2022	The Goldbergs	Formica Michael Mikowitz	8 episodes
2017–2025	Big Mouth	Marty Glouberman (voice)	42 episodes
2018–2019	Young Sheldon	Ira Rosenbloom	3 episodes
2018–2020	Summer Camp Island	Shark (voice)	7 episodes
2019	Documentary Now!	Larry	Episode: "Original Cast Album: Co-Op"
2019	Brockmire	Gus Barton	6 episodes
2019	Life in Pieces	Stuart	Episode: "Cabana Hero Action Son"
2019	Transparent	Howard	Episode: "Musicale Finale"
2019	A Million Little Things	Seymour	Episode: "Austin"
2019	John Mulaney & the Sack Lunch Bunch	Himself	Netflix special
2019–2020	At Home with Amy Sedaris	Sugar Griz / Lenny	2 episodes
2019–2021	Last Week Tonight with John Oliver	Richard Sackler / Blobfish	3 episodes
2019, 2022	The Good Fight	Judge Alan Davies	2 episodes
2019–2023	The Other Two	Skip Schamplin	5 episodes
2020	Indebted	Artie	2 episodes
2020	Bob's Burgers	Jules (voice)	Episode: "Flat-Top O' the Morning to Ya"
2020	Penny Dreadful: City of Angels	Sam Bloom	Episode: "Dead People Lie Down"
2020	Almost Paradise	Uncle Danny	Episode: "Uncle Danny"
2020	Helpsters	Land Lovin' Lars	Episode: "Sea Lovin' Sam"
2020	The Simpsons	Film Director (voice)	Episode: "A Springfield Summer Christmas for Christmas"
2021	Mickey Mouse Mixed-Up Adventures	Uncle Manny (voice)	Episode: "Donald's Dilemma"
2021	Devil May Care	Meteorologist Smith (voice)	Episode: "The Freeze"
2021	Everything's Gonna Be Okay	Toby	6 episodes
2021	Star Trek: Lower Decks	Doopler (voice)	Episode: "An Embarrassment of Dooplers"
2021–2024	Mickey Mouse Funhouse	Cheezel (voice)	19 episodes
2022	Blaze and the Monster Machines	Lord Carburetor (voice)	Episode: "Campfire Stories!"
2022	Beavis and Butt-Head	Rabbi (voice)	Episode: "Spiritual Journey"
2022	The Watcher	Mitch	4 episodes
2022	Little Demon	Himself (voice)	Episode: "Village of the Found"
2022–2023	East New York	Captain Stan Yenko	21 episodes
2023	History of the World, Part II	Saint Peter	3 episodes
2023	Family Guy	Rabbi Goldstein, Harold Goldfarb (voice)	2 episodes
2023	Ten Year Old Tom	Various characters (voice)	3 episodes
2023	Mr. Monk's Last Case: A Monk Movie	Funeral Director / Twins	Television film
2023–2024	Hamster & Gretel	Tchotchke Jones (voice)	2 episodes
2024	Clone High	Nostradamus (voice)	Episode: "The Cloniest Place on Earth: Missile While You Work"
2024	Girls5eva	Himself	Episode: "New York"
2024	John Mulaney Presents: Everybody's in LA	Himself (announcer)	6 episodes
2024	Kite Man: Hell Yeah!	Health Inspector (voice)	Episode: "Prison Break, Hell Yeah!"
2024	Evil	Judge Jared Jeter	2 episodes
2024	Velma	Himself (voice)	Episode: "This Halloween Needs To Be More Special!"
2024–present	Only Murders in the Building	Vince Fish	12 episodes
2024–2025	Night Court	Sy Hoffman	2 episodes
2025	Everybody's Live with John Mulaney	Himself (announcer)	12 episodes
2025	The Patrick Star Show	Benjamin B. Nana (voice)	Episode: "Sitcom Stars"
2025	Mid-Century Modern	Carol Mintz	2 episodes
2025	Poker Face	Jeffrey	Episode: "Whack-A-Mole"
2025	Ad World	Kyle's Dad	Episode: "About Us"
2025	Big City Greens	Ringmaster	Episode: "Unplanned"
2026	Krapopolis	Zeus (voice)	Episode: "Weekend at Zeusie's"
2026	Sofia the First: Royal Magic	Ember (voice)	Episode: "Zane the Hero"
2026	Life, Larry and the Pursuit of Unhappiness	Thomas A. Watson	Episode: "Livingston"

== Video games ==
Year	Title	Role
1998	A Bug's Life	Molt
2018	Lego The Incredibles	Bing Bong
2026	High on Life 2	Senator Muppy Doo

== Theatre ==
Year	Title	Role	Venue	Ref.
1984	Orwell That Ends Well	Performer	Village Gate, Off-Broadway	
2000	The Tale of the Allergist's Wife	Ira Taub (replacement)	Ethel Barrymore Theatre, Broadway	
2002	Funny Girl	Mr. Renaldi	New Amsterdam Theater, Broadway	
2003	Bounce	Addison Mizner	Kennedy Center, Washington D.C.	
2004	Sly Fox	The Judge / Foxwell J. Sly (replacement)	Ethel Barrymore Theatre, Broadway	
2004	The Drowsy Chaperone	Performer	Dodger Stages (now New World Stages), Off-Broadway	
2004–2005	The Producers	Max Bialystock (replacement)	St. James Theatre, Broadway	
2006	Dirty Rotten Scoundrels	Andre Thibault (replacement)	Imperial Theatre, Broadway	
2006	The Best Little Whorehouse in Texas	Senator Wingwoah	August Wilson Theatre, Broadway	
2006	an oak tree	Father (replacement)	Barrow Street Theatre, Off-Broadway	
2007	Spalding Gray: Stories Left to Tell	Performer	Minetta Lane Theatre, Off-Broadway	
2007	It's a Bird... It's a Plane... It's Superman	Performer	Stage Reading, California	
2008	A Funny Thing Happened on the Way to the Forum	Pseudolus	Stephen Sondheim Center for the Performing Arts	
2008	Candide	Voltaire	New York City Opera	
2008	Damn Yankees	Mr. Applegate	Casa Mañana	
2009	Guys and Dolls	Nathan Detroit	Ogunquit Playhouse	
2012	The Producers	Max Bialystock	Hollywood Bowl, California	
2013	The Big Knife	Marcus Hoff	American Airlines Theater, Broadway	
2016	Guys and Dolls	Nathan Detroit (replacement)	Phoenix Theatre, West End	
2016	Kiss Me, Kate	Second Man	Roundabout Theater Company Benefit Concert	
2018	Nassim	Performer	New York City Center Stage II, Off-Broadway	
2019	Kiss Me, Kate	Second Man (replacement)	Studio 54, Broadway	
2023	Gutenberg! The Musical!	The Producer (one night cameo)	James Earl Jones Theatre, Broadway	
2024	Bye Bye Birdie	Harry MacAfee	Kennedy Center	
2024–2025	All In: Comedy About Love	Performer	Hudson Theatre, Broadway	
2026	The Producers	Max Bialystock (replacement)	Garrick Theatre, West End	
2026	Hairspray	Edna Turnblad	The Muny	

== Theme park attractions ==
Year	Title	Role	Notes
2004	Stitch's Great Escape!	Sergeant C4703BK2704-90210	Pre-show
2012	Sorcerers of the Magic Kingdom	Alpaca Guard	Interactive game
