= Twin Cities Film Fest =

Annual film festival in Minnesota

- Location: Minneapolis–Saint Paul, Minnesota, U.S.
- Founded: 2010; 16 years ago
- Festival date: October
- Website: twincitiesfilmfest.org

The Twin Cities Film Fest (TCFF) is an annual film festival held in the Minneapolis–Saint Paul metropolitan area in Minnesota. The festival was founded by executive director Jatin Setia and was first held in 2010. Its programming includes independent films, studio releases, documentaries, short films and productions with connections to Minnesota.

== History ==
The inaugural festival opened on September 28, 2010, and screened more than two dozen films, including documentaries, independent productions and studio films. Waiting for "Superman" served as the opening film.

Setia has described the festival's programming strategy as combining higher-profile films with independent cinema, with the October schedule placing the event during the autumn awards season. The festival has also emphasized films and filmmakers with Minnesota connections.

During the COVID-19 pandemic, TCFF adopted a hybrid format combining theatrical screenings with online streaming. The festival retained the hybrid model after in-person events resumed.

== 2026 festival ==
The festival's 17th edition was held October 15–24, 2026, with more than 110 films screening at the Marcus West End Cinema in St. Louis Park and the Edina Mann 4 Theatre in Edina. The festival is scheduled to open with Martin McDonagh's Wild Horse Nine, starring John Malkovich, and conclude with a closing-night gala screening of Not Dead Yet, starring Richard Kind, Paul Raci and Tovah Feldshuh.
