= Olympia (2018 documentary film) =

2018 film directed by Harry Mavromichalis

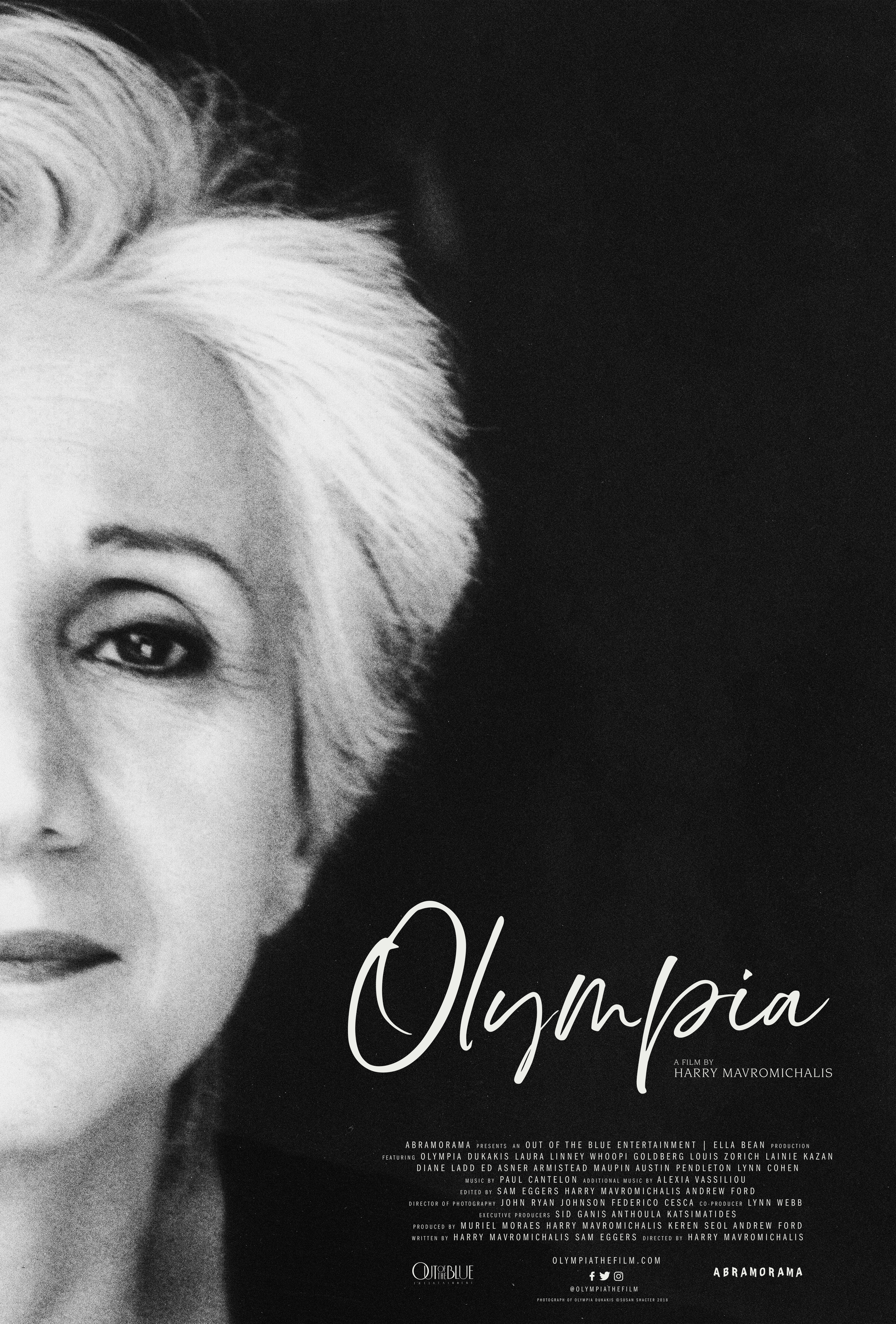
- Theatrical poster
- Directed by: Harry Mavromichalis
- Written by: Harry Mavromichalis; Sam Eggers
- Produced by: Harry Mavromichalis; Muriel Moraes; Keren Seol; Andrew Ford
- Starring: Olympia Dukakis; Whoopi Goldberg; Laura Linney; Diane Ladd; Lynn Cohen; Lainie Kazan; Austin Pendleton; Ed Asner; Armistead Maupin; Michael Dukakis
- Cinematography: John Ryan Johnson; Federico Cesca
- Edited by: Sam Eggers; Harry Mavromichalis; Andrew Ford
- Music by: Paul Cantelon
- Production company: Abramorama
- Release date: November 11, 2018 (Doc NYC)
- Running time: 101 minutes
- Country: United States
- Language: English

Olympia is a 2018 American documentary film directed by Harry Mavromichalis, about the career of Academy Award-winning actress Olympia Dukakis. The film premiered at Doc NYC in 2018 and was released in the United States on July 9, 2020.

== Appearances ==
- Olympia Dukakis
- Whoopi Goldberg
- Laura Linney
- Diane Ladd
- Lynn Cohen
- Lainie Kazan
- Austin Pendleton
- Ed Asner
- Armistead Maupin
- Michael Dukakis
- Thomas Kean
- Louis Zorich
- Apollo Dukakis
- Rocco Sisto
- Tony Simotes
- Tina Packer
- Peter Zorich
- Stefan Zorich

== Release ==
Olympia was shown at many film festivals including Doc NYC on November 11, 2018.

- Cleveland International Film Festival
- Thessaloniki International Film Festival
- Martha's Vineyard Film Festival
- RiverRun International Film Festival
- Martha's Vineyard Film Festival

== Reception ==
On Rotten Tomatoes, the film has an approval rating of 83% based on 18 reviews, with an average rating of 6.8/10. Frank Scheck of The Hollywood Reporter calls it "a compelling profile of a woman who's defiantly marched to the beat of her own drum."

Michael Ordoña of Los Angeles Times said Olympia "is much more about the personal than the professional, crafting an interior portrait of a woman at home in her own skin... and certainly an unusual celebrity documentary."
