= Not Dead Yet (film) =

Upcoming American comedy film

- Directed by: Eric Weber; Nick Weber
- Written by: Eric Weber
- Produced by: Michael Goodin
- Starring: Richard Kind; Paul Raci; Polly Draper; Tovah Feldshuh; Toby Huss; Seth Herzog; Ed German; Bill Smitrovich
- Production companies: Tenafly Film Company; Monolith Pictures
- Release date: October 9, 2026 (Hamptons International Film Festival)
- Running time: 88 minutes
- Country: United States
- Language: English

Not Dead Yet is an upcoming American comedy film written by Eric Weber and directed by Weber and his son, Nick Weber. It stars Richard Kind, Paul Raci, Polly Draper, Tovah Feldshuh, Toby Huss, Seth Herzog, Ed German and Bill Smitrovich. The film had its world premiere on October 9, 2026, at the 34th Hamptons International Film Festival. It was the closing-night gala film of the 2026 Twin Cities Film Fest on October 24.

== Premise ==
Elliot Kelman, a 68-year-old creative director, is abruptly fired from his advertising agency after being regarded as no longer hip or contemporary. Rather than accept his professional irrelevance, he retreats to the Hamptons with his wife, Gina. There he becomes part of a group of older residents that includes Cy, a lifelong surfer and artist; jazz disc jockey Ned Wednesday; Mike, a local resident; and Paulette, a veteran actress.

== Cast ==
- Richard Kind as Elliot Kelman
- Polly Draper as Gina
- Paul Raci as Cy
- Tovah Feldshuh as Paulette
- Ed German as Ned Wednesday
- Bill Smitrovich as Mike
- Toby Huss as Johnson Thorlo
- Seth Herzog as Goatee

== Production ==
Not Dead Yet was written by Eric Weber and directed by Weber and his son, Nick Weber. In March 2026, Deadline Hollywood reported that the pair had completed production on the film. The film was produced by Tenafly Film Company and Monolith Pictures; Michael Goodin produced for Monolith Pictures.

== Release ==
Not Dead Yet had its world premiere on October 9, 2026, at the 34th Hamptons International Film Festival, as part of the festival's Views From Long Island program. The Hollywood Reporter and The East Hampton Star also reported the film among the festival's announced world premieres.

The film was selected as the closing-night gala film of the 2026 Twin Cities Film Fest, where it won the Indie Vision: Best Ensemble Cast award.
