= Separate Vacations =

1986 film by Michael Anderson

- Directed by: Michael Anderson
- Written by: Robert Kaufman
- Based on: Separate Vacations by Eric Weber
- Produced by: Robert Lantos; Stephen J. Roth
- Starring: David Naughton; Jennifer Dale; Lally Cadeau
- Cinematography: François Protat
- Edited by: Ron Wisman
- Music by: Stanley Myers; Hans Zimmer
- Production companies: Playboy Productions; RSL Entertainment; Estudios Churubusco
- Distributed by: Alliance Communications
- Release date: 1986
- Running time: 91 min.
- Countries: Canada; Mexico
- Language: English

Separate Vacations is a 1986 sex comedy film, directed by Michael Anderson. The film stars David Naughton and Jennifer Dale. The film's cast also includes Lally Cadeau, Laurie Holden, Tony Rosato, Jay Woodcroft, Sherry Miller and Harvey Atkin. It’s an international co-production between Canada and Mexico.

Cadeau received a Genie Award nomination for Best Supporting Actress at the 7th Genie Awards.

== Plot ==
Richard and Sarah Moore, a long-married couple whose relationship has become unfulfilling, agree to take separate vacations in order to explore whether they want to stay together or break up and see other people.

== Cast ==
- David Naughton as Richard Moore
- Jennifer Dale as Sarah Moore
- Mark Keyloun as Jeff Ferguson
- Lally Cadeau as Shelly, The Wife
- Jackie Mahon as Annie Moore
- Jay Woodcroft as Bobby Moore
- Lee-Max Walton as Donald Moore
- Tony Rosato as Harry Blender
- Laurie Holden as Karen, The Babysitter
- Sherry Miller as Sandy, The Secretary
- Blanca Guerra as Alicia, The Working Girl
- Susan Almgren as Helene Gilbert
- Colleen Embree as Robyn, The Accountant
- Laura Henry as Nancy
- Harvey Atkin as Henry Gilbert
- Jose Escandon as Roberto, The Pimp
- Miguel Angel Fuentes as "Tiny", The Henchman
- Robbi Baker as Amanda, The Lodge Hostess
- Jessica Booker as Grandmother
- Fred Rahn as Grandfather
- Jorge Victoria as Immigration Officer
- Carolyn Dunn as Girl #1 At Pool (credited as Caroline Dunn)
- Rebecca Jones as Girl #2 At Pool
- Bonnie Kristian Squire as Girl #3 At Pool
