= Suits (film) =

- Theatrical release poster
- Directed by: Eric Weber
- Written by: Eric Weber
- Produced by: Chris Giordano
- Cinematography: Peter Nelson
- Edited by: Nancy Novack
- Music by: Air Supply
- Release date: January 8, 1999
- Country: United States

Suits is a 1999 American comedy film written and directed by Eric Weber and starring Robert Klein, Tony Hendra, Larry Pine.

== Cast ==
- Robert Klein...Tom Cranston
- Tony Hendra...George Parkyn
- Larry Pine...Peter Haverford
- Paul Lazar...Mitchell Mitnick
- Randy Pearlstein...Ken Tuttle
- Frank Minucci...Robert Naylor Sr
- Edoardo Ballerini
- Ingrid Rogers... Anita Tanner
- James Villemaire...Doug Humphrey
- Mark Lake...Harson Covington
- Joelle Carter... Heidi Wilson
- Eben Moore...Rodney De Mole

== Credits ==
Written and directed by Eric Weber; director of photography Peter Nelson; edited by Nancy Novack; music by Pat Irwin; additional music by Air Supply; produced by Chris Giordano; Released by Tenafly Film Company.
