= Bill Smitrovich =

American actor (born 1947)

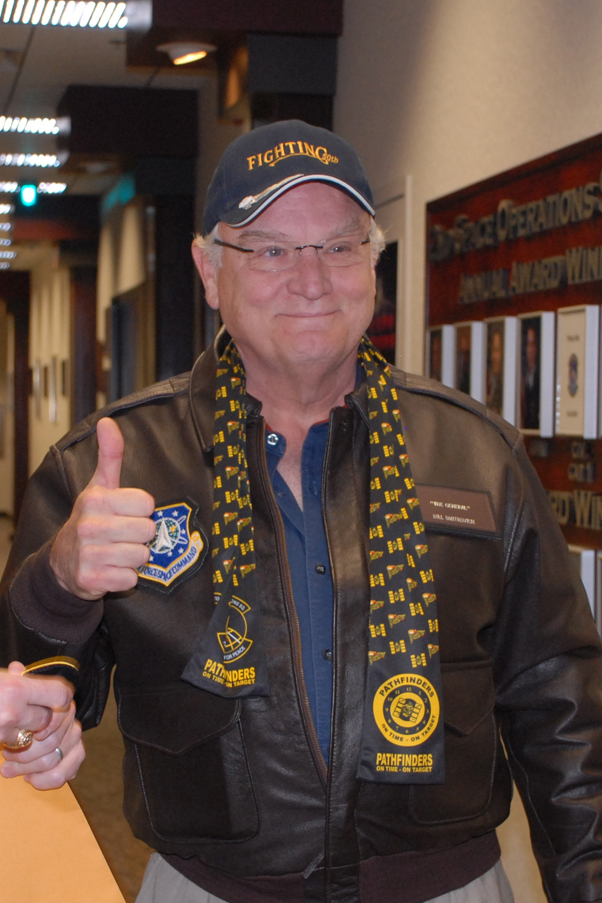
- Smitrovich at Schriever Air Force Base in 2010
- Born: Stanley William Zmitrowicz Jr. May 16, 1947 (age 79); Bridgeport, Connecticut, U.S.
- Occupation: Actor
- Years active: 1982–present
- Spouse: Shaw Purnell
- Children: 2

Stanley William Zmitrowicz Jr. (born May 16, 1947), known professionally as Bill Smitrovich (/ˈsmɪtrəvɪtʃ/ SMIT-rə-vitch), is an American actor.

== Personal life ==
Smitrovich was born on May 16, 1947, in Bridgeport, Connecticut, the son of Anna (née Wojna) and Stanley William Zmitrowicz, a tool and die maker. He is of Polish descent. Bill is a graduate of the University of Bridgeport (1972) and holds an MFA from Smith College (1976). He is married to Shaw Purnell from Pittsburgh, Pennsylvania. They have a son, Alexander John, and a daughter Maya Christina, four years younger.

== Career ==
Smitrovich has starred in a number of television series. His first prominent TV series role was in the 1980s series Crime Story as Det. Sgt. Danny Krychek. He went on to star in the hit drama series Life Goes On (1989–93). Smitrovich was the lead guest star in the pilot film of the 1980s crime drama hit series Miami Vice. He also appeared in the final episode of NYPD Blue. He has also been seen in The Henry Lee Project with Danny Glover. In 1996, Smitrovich was cast as Seattle police lieutenant Bob Bletcher in Millennium. He is known for his roles on the A&E series A Nero Wolfe Mystery (based on the Nero Wolfe detective stories by Rex Stout) as Inspector Cramer, and on the ABC series The Practice as Assistant District Attorney Kenneth Walsh and then went on to Without a Trace, where he played the recurring character of Chief Alex Olcyk. In 2010, he starred in the NBC series The Event as Vice President Raymond Jarvis.

Smitrovich has also played several characters in military roles. These include Independence Day (1996), Air Force One (1997), Thirteen Days (2000), Fail Safe (2000), and Eagle Eye (2008).

He has made many guest appearances on various television shows. His best-known appearances include the two-part Star Trek: Deep Space Nine third-season episode "Past Tense," 24, Numb3rs, NYPD Blue, Touched by an Angel, Law & Order: Special Victims Unit, Criminal Minds, Castle, and the Dynasty reboot.

Smitrovich has also starred in several television films, playing Alexander Haig in the 2003 biographical miniseries The Reagans, as well as roles in Futuresport (1998) and in The '60s miniseries (1999). On film, Smitrovich's roles include the Stephen King adaptation Silver Bullet (1985), Renegades (1989), The Trigger Effect (1996), Gridiron Gang (2006), and the Marvel Comics superhero film Iron Man (2008).

Bill played the role of Mr. Zimburger in the Johnny Depp film The Rum Diary. He also appeared as the head of the CIA, Hanley, in Pierce Brosnan's film The November Man.

== Selected filmography ==
=== Television ===
Year	Title	Role	Notes
1982	Muggable Mary, Street Cop	Charlie Hock	Television film
1983	Skipper Kevin Corkum	Dan Harvie	Television film
1995	Fantastic Four	Daredevil (voice)	Episode: "And a Blind Man Shall Lead Them"
1996–1997	Millenium	Lt. Robert "Bob" Bletcher	11 episodes
1998	Futuresport	Couch Douglas	Television film
1999–2000	Batman Beyond	Ronnie Boxer, Frank Watt (voice)	2 episodes
2000	Fail Safe	General Stark	Television film
2000	The Golden Spiders: A Nero Wolfe Mystery	Inspector Cramer	Television film
2001–2002	Nero Wolfe	Inspector Cramer	25 episodes
2003	The Reagans	Alexander Haig	Television film
2015	Two and a Half Men	Rick	Episode: "For Whom the Booty Calls"
2016	Grey's Anatomy	Therapist	Episode: "All I Want Is You"
2017–2018	Dynasty	Thomas Carrington	3 episodes

=== Film ===
Year	Title	Role	Notes
1982	A Little Sex	Technician	
1983	Without a Trace	Police Officer	
1984	Splash	Ralph Bauer	
1984	Maria's Lovers	Bartender	
1985	Key Exchange	Lenny	
1985	Silver Bullet	Andy Fairton	
1985	The Beniker Gang	Laundry Truck Driver	
1986	A Killing Affair	Pink Gresham	
1986	Band of the Hand	Chavez	
1986	Manhunter	Lloyd Bowman	
1989	Her Alibi	Farrell	
1989	Renegades	Finch	
1990	Crazy People	Bruce	
1995	Bodily Harm	Darryl Stewart	
1995	Nick of Time	Officer Trust	
1996	The Phantom	Dave Palmer	
1996	Independence Day	Colonel Watson	
1996	The Trigger Effect	Steph	
1996	Ghosts of Mississippi	Jim Kitchens	
1997	Air Force One	William Northwood	
1998	Around the Fire	Matt Harris	
2000	Thirteen Days	Maxwell Taylor	
2005	The Game of Their Lives	Admiral Higgins	
2006	Heavens Fall	George Chamlee	
2006	Gridiron Gang	Wainwright	
2008	The Last Lullaby	Martin	
2008	Iron Man	General Gabriel	
2008	Flash of Genius	Judge Franks	
2008	Eagle Eye	Admiral Thompson	
2008	Seven Pounds	George Ristuccia	
2011	The Rum Diary	Mr. Zimburger	
2012	Ted	Frank	
2014	The November Man	Hanley	
2015	Ted 2	Frank	
2017	Bitch	Papa	
2024	Joker: Folie à Deux	Herman Rothwax	
2026	Not Dead Yet	Mike	
