= Emily & Tim =

- Film poster
- Directed by: Eric Weber
- Written by: Eric Weber
- Based on: The Pact by Eric Weber
- Produced by: Josh Sugarman; Eric Weber; Adam Folk
- Starring: Alexis Bledel; Andre Braugher; Cara Buono; Olympia Dukakis; Dominic Fumusa; Malcolm Gets; Zosia Mamet; Thomas Mann; Kal Penn; David Pittu; Phylicia Rashad; Louis Zorich
- Cinematography: Timothy Naylor
- Edited by: Adam Mack
- Music by: Ronan Coleman; Charles Goodan
- Production companies: Tenafly Film; Bullet Pictures
- Release date: August 29, 2015 (Montreal World Film Festival)
- Running time: 89 minutes
- Country: United States
- Language: English

Emily & Tim (formerly titled Outliving Emily) is a 2015 American anthology drama film written and directed by Eric Weber and starring Zosia Mamet, Thomas Mann, Alexis Bledel, Kal Penn, Cara Buono, Dominic Fumusa, Malcolm Gets, David Pittu, Andre Braugher, Phylicia Rashad, Olympia Dukakis and Louis Zorich. It is based on Weber's short story The Pact.

== Cast ==
- Kathleen Turner as Narrator

=== Attraction ===
- Zosia Mamet as Emily
- Thomas Mann as Tim
- Jeremy Jordan as Raymond Phayer
- Luke Brandon Field
- Adam Rose as Jon Posnick

=== Discord ===
- Alexis Bledel as Emily
- Kal Penn as Tim
- Gianna Galluzzi as Meg
- Alan Simpson
- Peter Y. Kim
- Josh Sugarman
- Teresa Kelsey

=== Betrayal ===
- Cara Buono as Emily
- Dominic Fumusa as Tim Hanratty
- Alexis Molnar
- Gary Milner as Phayer
- Julia Murney
- Jennifer Damiano as Helayne
- Joel Rooks
- Peter Von Berg

=== Healing ===
- Malcolm Gets as Emile
- David Pittu as Tim
- Richard Joseph Paul as Phayer
- Zainab Jah as Helayne
- Priscilla Shanks
- Drena De Niro
- Alok Tewari
- Jenny Bacon
- Dana Eskelson

=== Acceptance ===
- Phylicia Rashad as Emily
- Andre Braugher as Tim
- Adepero Oduye
- Vincent Filliatre as Raymond
- Edan Alexander as Riley
- Damian Norfleet as Emcee
- Catherine Ryan
- Oliver Solomon
- Olivia Negron
- Tibor Feldman

=== Attachment ===
- Olympia Dukakis as Emily
- Louis Zorich as Tim Hanratty
- Bernie McInerney

== Release ==
The film premiered at the Montreal World Film Festival on August 29, 2015.

== Reception ==
Gary Goldstein of the Los Angeles Times gave the film a negative review and wrote, "But an intriguing casting gimmick can’t mask a story — and a relationship — that’s largely unremarkable." On Chicago Tribune, Alissa Simon wrote, "it’s a nice concept (...) But overall (...) is about as profound as a Hallmark greeting card and as sophisticated as an average Lifetime movie."
