= Olympia Dukakis =

American actress (1931–2021)

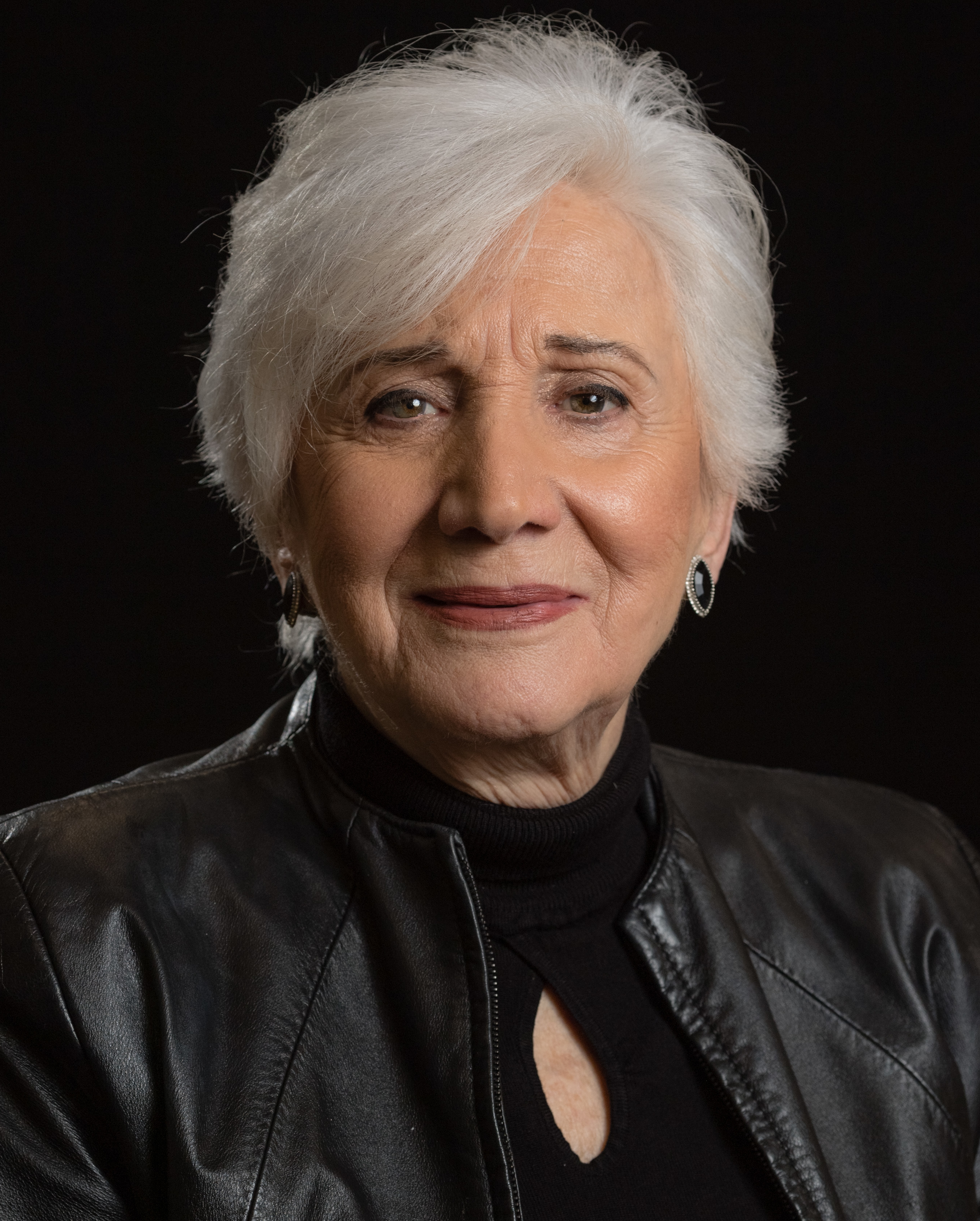
- Dukakis in 2019
- Born: June 20, 1931; Lowell, Massachusetts, U.S.
- Died: May 1, 2021 (aged 89); New York City, U.S.
- Education: Boston University (BA, MFA)
- Occupation: Actress
- Years active: 1961–2021
- Spouse: Louis Zorich (m. 1962; died 2018)
- Children: 3
- Relatives: Michael Dukakis (cousin)

Olympia Dukakis (June 20, 1931 – May 1, 2021) was an American actress. She performed in more than 130 stage productions, in some 60 films, and in approximately 50 television series. Best known as a screen actress, she started her career in theater. Not long after her arrival in New York City, she won an Obie Award for Best Actress in 1963 for her off-Broadway performance in Bertolt Brecht's Man Equals Man.

She later moved to film acting and won an Academy Award and a Golden Globe, among other accolades, for her performance in Moonstruck (1987). She received another Golden Globe nomination for Sinatra (1992) and Emmy Award nominations for Lucky Day (1991), More Tales of the City (1998) and Joan of Arc (1999). Dukakis's autobiography, Ask Me Again Tomorrow: A Life in Progress, was published in 2003. In 2018, a feature-length documentary about her life, titled Olympia, was released theatrically in the United States.

== Early life and education ==
Olympia Dukakis (Greek: Ολυμπία Δουκάκη) was born in Lowell, Massachusetts, on June 20, 1931, the daughter of Alexandra "Alec" (née Christou) and Constantine "Costas" S. Dukakis. Her parents were Greek immigrants; her father a refugee from Anatolia, and her mother an immigrant from the Peloponnese. She had a brother, Apollo, six years her junior. Her cousin was former Massachusetts governor and 1988 U.S. presidential nominee Michael Dukakis. As a girl, she was significantly involved in sports and was a three-time New England fencing champion. She contended with pressures within her patriarchal Greek family and around her, "in a neighborhood where ethnic discrimination, particularly against Greeks, was routine."

Dukakis was an alumna of Arlington High School, and was educated at Boston University where she majored in physical therapy, earning a BA, of which she made use when treating patients with polio during the height of the epidemic. She later returned to BU and earned a Master of Fine Arts degree in performing arts.

== Career ==
=== Stage ===
Prior to appearing in films, Dukakis began a decades-long stage life. She started in productions at the Williamstown Theatre Festival in Williamstown, Massachusetts.

By 1963, she had begun her career on screen. Transitioning to a professional life centered in New York City, she performed many times in productions in Central Park at the renowned Delacorte Theater. Returning to Western Massachusetts in 2013 for her last stage performance, she played Mother Courage in Mother Courage and Her Children at Shakespeare & Company, in Lenox, Massachusetts.

In 1963, Dukakis's early Off-Broadway presence was rewarded with an Obie Award for Distinguished Performance, as Widow Leocadia Begbick in Man Equals Man (a.k.a., A Man's A Man). She continued to perform there every few years, with her last appearance on that stage occurring in 2003, where she played multiple roles in The Chekov Cycle.

In 1973, along with her husband, Louis Zorich, and with other acting couples, she co-founded the Whole Theater Company. The company's first play was Our Town. With Dukakis as artistic director, the theater rolled out five productions per season for almost two decades. Across that span, productions included works by Euripides, Eugene O'Neill, Samuel Beckett, Tennessee Williams, Edward Albee, and Lanford Wilson. Among the actors performing with Dukakis and her husband were José Ferrer, Colleen Dewhurst, Blythe Danner, and Samuel L. Jackson.

Dukakis's stage directing credits include many classics, such as Orpheus Descending, The House of Bernarda Alba, Uncle Vanya, and A Touch of the Poet, as well as more contemporary works, such as One Flew Over the Cuckoo's Nest and Kennedy's Children.

She also adapted plays such as "Mother Courage" and The Trojan Women for her Montclair, New Jersey-situated theater company. Her Broadway theatre credits include Who's Who in Hell and Social Security. She appeared in Martin Sherman's one-woman play, Rose, entirely a monologue about a woman who survived the Warsaw Ghetto, in London and then on Broadway. For the role, she won the 2000 Outer Critics Circle Awards for Outstanding Solo Performance. Twenty-two years after earning her first Obie, she won her second in 1985, an Ensemble Performance Award, for playing Soot Hudlocke in The Marriage of Bette and Boo.

=== Screen ===
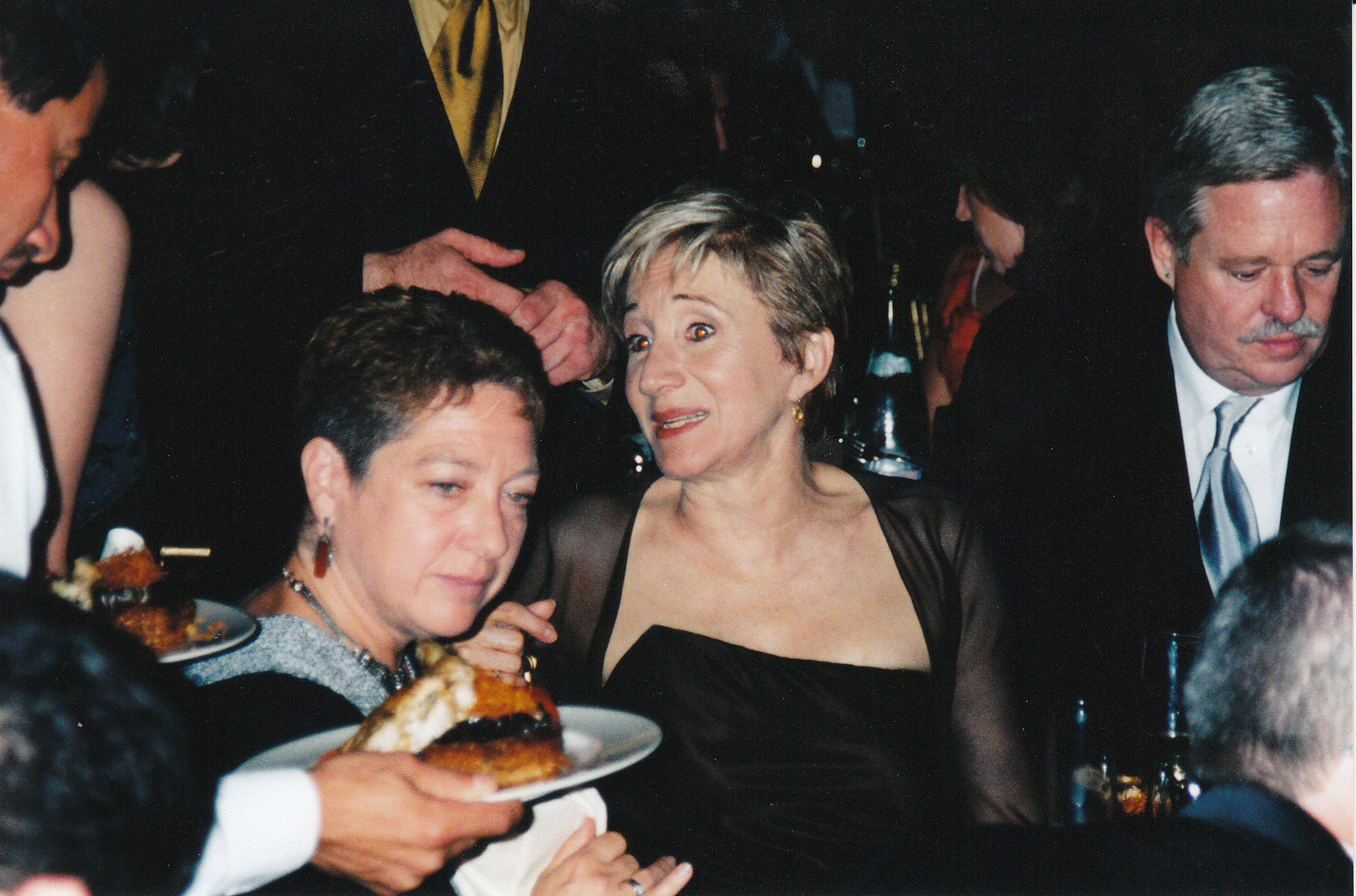
Dukakis at the 1998 Emmy Awards

Dukakis' first appearance on screen was in avant-garde film creator Gregory J. Markopoulos' 1963 film Twice a Man, in which she plays the role of the protagonist's mother whom he meets as a young woman.

Dukakis appeared in a number of films, including Steel Magnolias, Mr. Holland's Opus, Jane Austen's Mafia!, The Thing About My Folks and Moonstruck, for which she won an Oscar for Best Supporting Actress.

She also played the role of Anna Madrigal in the Tales of the City television mini-series, which garnered her an Emmy Award nomination, and appeared on Search for Tomorrow as Dr. Barbara Moreno (1983), who romanced Stu Bergman. She appeared as Dolly Sinatra in the mini-series of Frank Sinatra's life (1992).

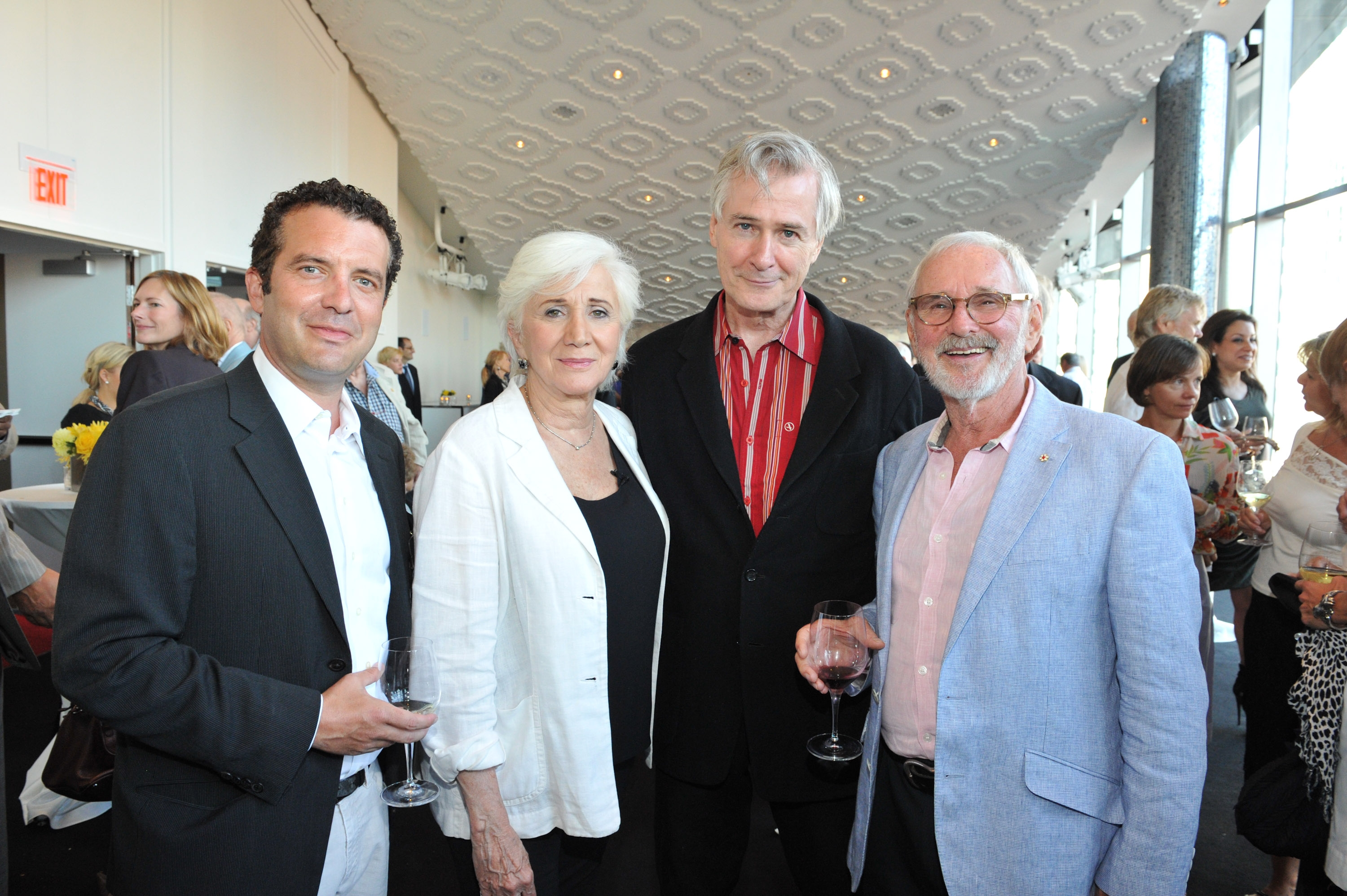
Dukakis at Malaparte for Norman Jewison and Friends with Moonstruck, August 2011

Moonstruck (1987) was directed by Norman Jewison who predicted Dukakis would receive honors for the role. She believed him after receiving the Academy Award for Best Supporting Actress. In addition to her Oscar, she took the Golden Globe in the same category. The honors compounded as she collected the Los Angeles and New York Film Critics Awards, all in recognition of her talent, some acting improvised, as she delivered a serious while hilarious performance. Her role of the no-nonsense matriarch, Rose Castorini, plays off Cher's Best Actress Award-winning role as daughter Loretta.

She was nominated for the Canadian Academy Award for The Event (2003) and in the middle of the first decade of the 21st century, her roles included 3 Needles, The Librarian: Return to King Solomon's Mines, In the Land of Women, and Away From Her, the 2006 film which cast her alongside Gordon Pinsent as the spouses of two Alzheimer's patients.

She took on significant work on the small screen as well. In 1998, she starred as Charlotte Kiszko in the British TV drama A Life for a Life: The True Story of Stefan Kiszko (ITV), based on the actual story of a man wrongfully imprisoned for seventeen years for the murder of a child, Lesley Molseed, after police suppressed evidence of his innocence.

In another genre entirely, she provided the voice of Grandpa's love interest for The Simpsons episode "The Old Man and the Key" (2002).

In 2000, she played alongside Ian Holm, Judi Dench, Joan Sims (her final acting performance before her death in 2001), and Romola Garai (her first professional role) in the television film The Last of the Blonde Bombshells.

In 2008, Dukakis directed the world premiere production of Todd Logan's Botanic Garden at Victory Gardens Theatre in Chicago, Illinois. The same year, she starred in the revival of Tennessee Williams' The Milk Train Doesn't Stop Here Anymore, opposite Kevin Anderson at the Hartford Stage, and co-adapted and starred in the world-premiere of Another Side of the Island, based on William Shakespeare's The Tempest, at Alpine Theatre Project in Whitefish, Montana.

In 2011, Dukakis guest-starred on Law & Order: Special Victims Unit, as attorney Debby Marsh. In 2013, she starred in and executive-produced the 2013 film Montana Amazon, co-starring Haley Joel Osment. The same year, on May 24, she was honored with the 2,498th star on the Hollywood Walk of Fame.

In 2018, Dukakis starred in Eleftheromania, which follows an Auschwitz survivor as she recites a true story about a group from the Auschwitz-Birkenau death camp. The following year, Dukakis reprised the role of Anna Madrigal, which she had first played in 1993, in a Netflix update of Armistead Maupin's Tales of The City.

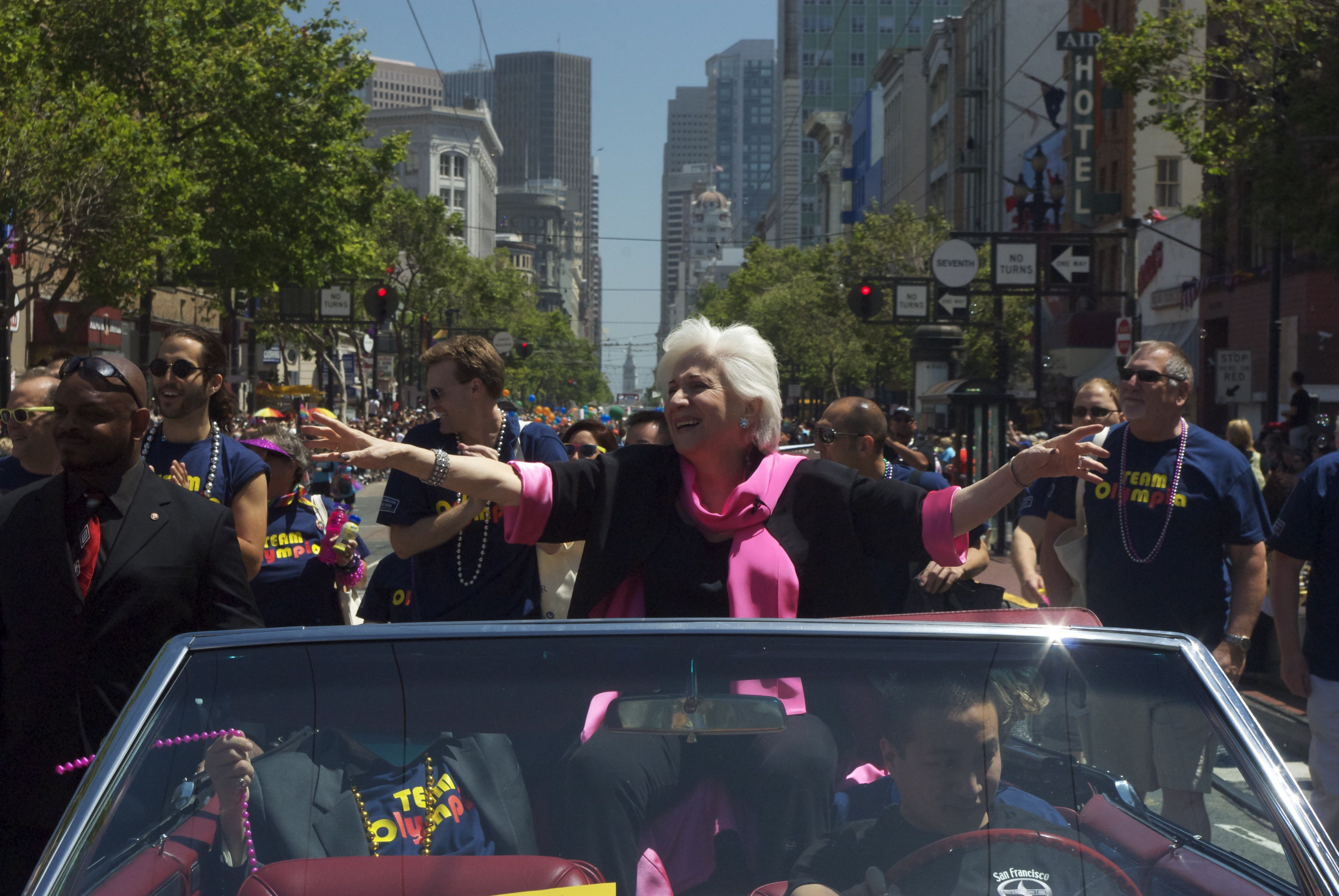
Dukakis rides up Market Street as one of the Celebrity Grand Marshals in the LGBT Pride Parade in San Francisco on June 26, 2011, from the film, Olympia.

In 2018, Olympia, an American documentary film about her life and career, had its festival premiere at DOC NYC. The film, directed by Harry Mavromichalis, features Whoopi Goldberg, Laura Linney, Ed Asner, Lainie Kazan, Armistead Maupin, Austin Pendleton, Diane Ladd and Dukakis's cousin, Governor Michael Dukakis. It was released theatrically in the United States in July 2020.

Dukakis's final performance is as a judge in the 2021 film Not to Forget, directed by Valerio Zanoli.

== Personal life ==
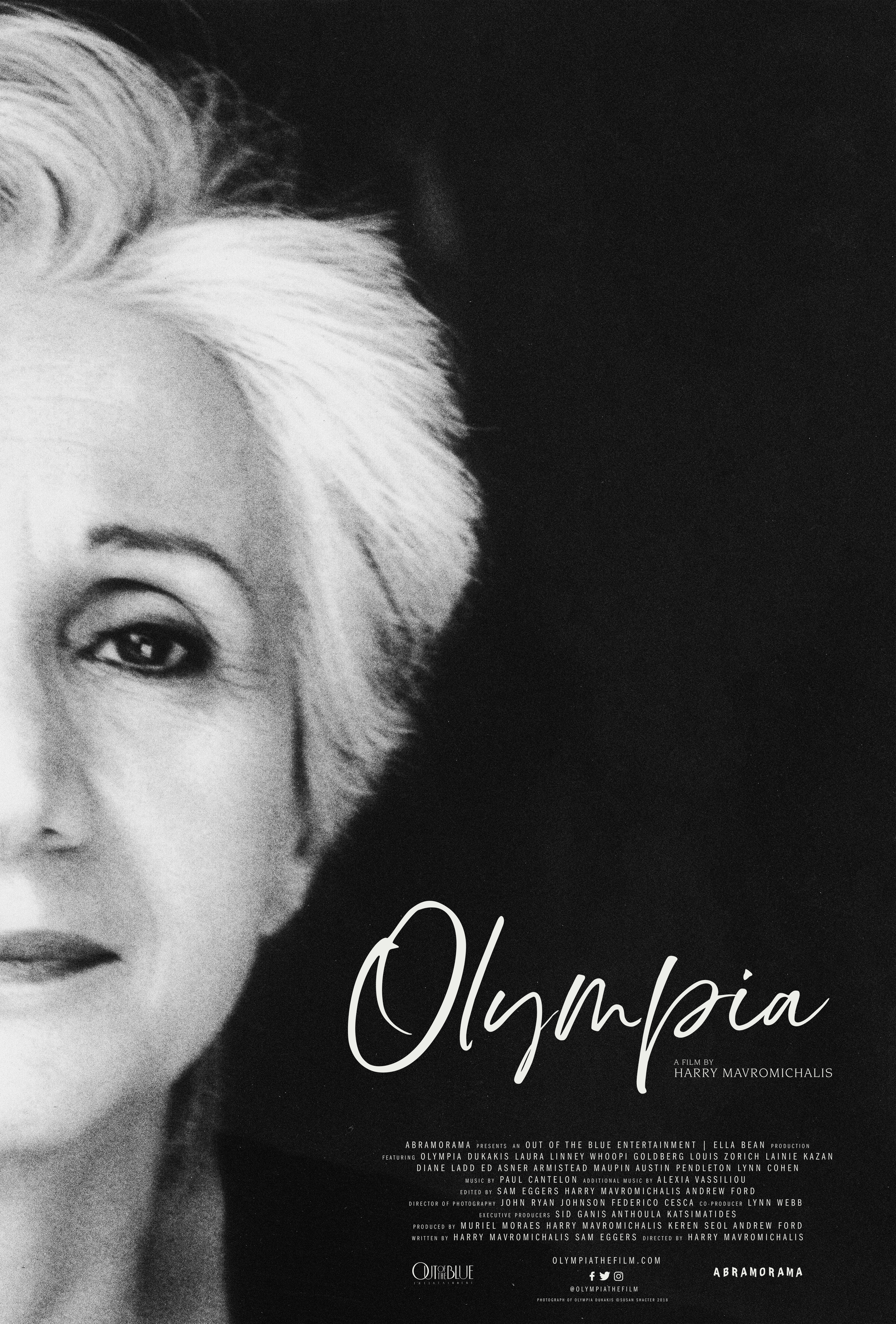
The theatrical poster of the film Olympia, directed by Harry Mavromichalis, documenting Dukakis's career

In 1962, Dukakis married fellow Manhattan stage actor Louis Zorich. Planning for a family, they moved out of the city in 1970 to settle in Montclair, New Jersey. It was there that they raised their three children: Christina, Peter, and Stefan. They had four grandchildren.

In her 2003 autobiography, Ask Me Again Tomorrow: A Life in Progress, Dukakis describes the challenges she faced as a first-generation Greek-American in an area with anti-Greek ethnic bigotry, violence, and discrimination; difficulties with her mother and in other relationships; and battles with substances and chronic illness.

She led an off-screen and off-stage active life. She taught acting for fifteen years at NYU and gave master classes for professional theatre universities, colleges, and companies across the country. She received the National Arts Club Medal of Honor.

Dukakis became an adherent of Goddess worship, a feminist form of modern Paganism, during a production of The Trojan Women in 1982. From 1989, she was publicly outspoken about this and produced improvised stage performances based on the movement's mythology. For ten years, beginning in 1985, she studied with Indian mentor Srimata Gayatri Devi in the Vedanta school of Hindu philosophy.

A strong advocate for women's rights and LGBT rights, including same-sex marriage, Dukakis embraced the roles of a trans landlady in Tales of the City, and a butch lesbian in Cloudburst. She was a figure on the lecture circuit discussing topics such as women living with chronic illness, life in the theater, the environment, and feminism. She has said,

I recognize that the real pulse of life is transformation, yet I work in a world dominated by men and the things men value, where transformation is not the coinage. It's not even the language!

=== Death ===
After a period of ill health, Dukakis died under hospice care at her home in Manhattan on May 1, 2021, at the age of 89.

== Filmography ==
=== Film ===
Year	Title	Role	Notes	Ref.
1964	Twice a Man	Young mother		
1964	Lilith	Patient	Uncredited	
1969	Stiletto	Mrs. Amato	Uncredited	
1969	John and Mary	John's mother		
1971	Made for Each Other	Mrs. Panimba		
1973	Sisters	Louise Wilanski	Uncredited	
1974	Death Wish	Officer Gemetti	Listed in opening credits only	
1974	The Rehearsal			
1979	The Wanderers	Mrs. Capra		
1979	Rich Kids	Bea		
1980	The Idolmaker	Mrs. Vacarri		
1982	National Lampoon Goes to the Movies	Helena Naxos	Segment: "Success Wanters"	
1985	Walls of Glass	Mary Flanagan		
1987	Moonstruck	Rose Castorini	Academy Award for Best Supporting Actress; American Comedy Award for Funniest Supporting Female Performer – Motion Picture or TV; Golden Globe Award for Best Supporting Actress – Motion Picture; Kansas City Film Critics Circle Award for Best Supporting Actress; Los Angeles Film Critics Association Award for Best Supporting Actress; National Board of Review Award for Best Supporting Actress; Nominated – BAFTA Award for Best Actress in a Supporting Role; Nominated – New York Film Critics Circle Award for Best Supporting Actress	
1988	Working Girl	Ruth		
1989	Look Who's Talking	Rosie		
1989	Steel Magnolias	Clairee Belcher	Nominated – American Comedy Award for Funniest Supporting Actress in a Motion Picture	
1989	Dad	Bette Tremont		
1990	In the Spirit	Sue		
1990	Look Who's Talking Too	Rosie		
1992	Over the Hill	Alma Harris		
1993	The Cemetery Club	Doris Silverman		
1993	Digger	Bea		
1993	Look Who's Talking Now	Rosie		
1994	Dead Badge	Dr. Doris Rice		
1994	Naked Gun 33 1/3: The Final Insult	Herself	Uncredited	
1994	I Love Trouble	Jeannie		
1995	Jeffrey	Mrs. Marcangelo		
1995	Mighty Aphrodite	Jocasta		
1995	Mr. Holland's Opus	Principal Helen Jacobs		
1996	Mother	Mrs. Jay		
1996	Jerusalem	Mrs. Gordon		
1996	Milk & Money	Goneril Plogg		
1997	Balkan Island: The Last Story of the Century	Mother		
1997	Picture Perfect	Rita Mosley		
1998	Mafia!	Sophia Cortino		
1998	Better Living	Nora		
2000	Brooklyn Sonnet	Helen Manners		
2002	The Intended	Erina		
2003	The Event	Lila	Grand Jury Award for Outstanding Actress in a Feature Film; Nominated – Genie Award for Best Performance by an Actress in a Supporting Role	
2003	Charlie's War	Charlie		
2005	The Great New Wonderful	Judy Hillerman	Segment: "Judy's Story"	
2005	The Thing About My Folks	Muriel Kleinman		
2005	3 Needles	Hilde		
2005	Whiskey School	Ellen Haywood		
2005	Jesus, Mary and Joey	Sophia Vitello		
2006	Away from Her	Marian		
2006	Day on Fire	Dr. Mary Wade		
2006	Upside Out	Dr. Walker		
2007	In the Land of Women	Phyllis		
2011	Cloudburst	Stella	Nominated – Seattle International Film Festival Award for Best Actress	
2011	Outliving Emily	Emily Hanratty	Short film	
2013	Montana Amazon	Ira Dunderhead	Also executive producer	
2013	The Last Keepers	Rosmarie Carver		
2013	A Little Game	YaYa		
2015	7 Chinese Brothers	Grandma		
2015	Emily & Tim	Emily	Segment: "6" or "Attachment"	
2016	The Infiltrator	Aunt Vicky		
2016	Broken Links	Arlene		
2018	Change in the Air	Margaret Lemke		
2018	Olympia	Herself	DOC NYC, Thessaloniki Documentary Festival, Cleveland International Film Festival	
2021	Not to Forget	Judge	Final film role (released posthumously)	

=== Television ===
Year	Title	Role	Notes	Ref.
1962	The Nurses	Ioana Chiriac	Episode: "Frieda"	
1962	Dr. Kildare	Anna Nieves	Episode: "The Legacy"	
1974	Nicky's World	Irene Kaminios	Television film	
1975	Great Performances	Pauline	Episode: "The Seagull"	
1977	The Andros Targets	Marina Angelis	Episode: "The Beast of Athens"	
1978	The Doctors	Mrs. Martin	NBC-TV	
1980	FDR: The Final Years		Television film	
1980	Breaking Away		Episode: "The Cutters"	
1982	American Playhouse	Mama Nicola	Episode: "King of America"	
1982	One of the Boys	Professor	Episode: "His Cheatin' Heart"	
1982	The Neighborhood	Mrs. St. Paul	Television film	
1983	Search for Tomorrow	Dr. Barbara Moreno	NBC-TV/Procter & Gamble Productions	
1986	The Equalizer	Judge Paula G. Walsh	Episode: "Shades of Darkness"	
1991	Lucky Day	Katherine Campbell	Television film Nominated – Primetime Emmy Award for Outstanding Supporting Actress in a Miniseries or a Movie	
1991	The General Motors Playwrights Theater	Laura Cunningham	Episode: "The Last Act Is a Solo"	
1991	Fire in the Dark	Emily Miller	Television film	
1992	Sinatra	Dolly Sinatra	Television miniseries 4 episodes Nominated – Golden Globe Award for Best Supporting Actress – Series, Miniseries or Television Film	
1993	Tales of the City	Anna Madrigal	Television miniseries 6 episodes Nominated – British Academy Television Award for Best Actress	
1995	Young at Heart	Rose Garaventi	Television film	
1996	Touched by an Angel	Clara	Episode: "A Joyful Noise"	
1997	Heaven Will Wait	Diana	Television film	2
1997	A Match Made in Heaven	Helen Rosner	Television film	
1998	Scattering Dad	Dotty	Television film	
1998	The Pentagon Wars	Madam Chairwoman	Television film	
1998	More Tales of the City	Anna Madrigal	Television miniseries 6 episodes Nominated – Primetime Emmy Award for Outstanding Lead Actress in a Miniseries or a Movie; Nominated – Satellite Award for Best Actress – Miniseries or Television Film; Nominated – Screen Actors Guild Award for Outstanding Performance by a Female Actor in a Miniseries or Television Movie	
1998	A Life for a Life	Charlotte Kiszko	Television film	
1999	Joan of Arc	Mother Babette	Television miniseries 3 episodes Nominated – Primetime Emmy Award for Outstanding Supporting Actress in a Miniseries or a Movie	
2000	The Last of the Blonde Bombshells	Dinah	Television film	
2001	And Never Let Her Go	Marguerite Capano	Television film	
2001	Ladies and the Champ	Sara Stevens	Television film	
2001	Further Tales of the City	Anna Madrigal	Television miniseries 3 episodes	
2001	My Beautiful Son	Esther Lipman	Television film	
2002	Guilty Hearts	Amanda Patterson	Television film	
2002	The Simpsons	Zelda	Voice, episode: "The Old Man and the Key"	
2002	Frasier	Caller #3	Episode: "Frasier Has Spokane"	
2003	Mafia Doctor	Rose	Television film	
2003	It's All Relative	Coleen O'Neil	Episode: "Thanks, But No Thanks"	
2004	The Librarian: Quest for the Spear	Margie Carsen	Television film	
2004–2005	Center of the Universe	Marge Barnett	12 episodes	
2006	Numbers	Charlotte Yates	Episode: "Hot Shot"	
2006	The Librarian: Return to King Solomon's Mines	Margie Carsen	Television film	
2008	Worst Week	June	Episodes: "The Ring", "The Wedding"	
2010–2011	Bored to Death	Belinda	4 episodes	
2011	Law & Order: Special Victims Unit	Debby Marsh	Episode: "Pop"	
2013	The Christmas Spirit	Gwen Hollander	Television film	
2013	Mike & Molly	Narrator on TV	Episode: "The Princess and the Troll"	
2013–2015	Sex & Violence	Alex Mandalakis	Television miniseries; she was executive producer; participated in 12 episodes	
2013–2015	Forgive Me	Novalea	9 episodes	
2014	F to 7th	Marie	Episode: "Down to Zero"	
2014	Big Driver	Doreen	Television film	
2016	TripTank	Ma / Caller	Voice, 4 episodes	
2019	Tales of the City	Anna Madrigal	Main cast	

=== Stage ===
Year	Title	Role	Notes
1961	Five Finger Exercises	Louise Harrington	Williamstown Theatre Festival
1961	J.B.	Mrs. Botticelli	Williamstown Theatre Festival
1961	Once in a Lifetime	Helen Hobart	Williamstown Theatre Festival
1961	Othello	Emilia	Williamstown Theatre Festival
1961	Romanoff and Juliet	Evdokia Romanoff	Williamstown Theatre Festival
1961	Toys in the Attic	Carrie Bernier	Williamstown Theatre Festival
1962	The Aspern Papers	Assunta (Understudy)	Playhouse Theatre, Broadway
1962	A Man's A Man	Leocadia Begbick	New Repertory Theatre, Off-Broadway
1963	A Birthday Party For Shakespeare	Katherine	Williamstown Theatre Festival
1963	The Cherry Orchard	Charlotta	Williamstown Theatre Festival
1963	The Zoo Story and The American Dream	Mrs. Barker	Williamstown Theatre Festival
1963	The Night of the Iguana	Maxine Faulk	Williamstown Theatre Festival
1963	Long Day's Journey into Night	Mary Tyrone	Williamstown Theatre Festival
1963	A Fair Country	Amalie Freud	Williamstown Theatre Festival
1964	Abraham Cochrane	Anne Dowling	Belasco Theatre, Broadway
1967	Titus Andronicus	Tamora	The Public Theater, Off-Broadway
1968	Camino Real	The Gypsy	Williamstown Theatre Festival
1968	Iphigeneia at Aulis	Clytemnestra	Williamstown Theatre Festival
1968	The Seagull	Pauline Andreyevna	Williamstown Theatre Festival
1968	The White Liars and Black Comedy	Sophie	Williamstown Theatre Festival
1969	Peer Gynt	Anitra	The Public Theater, Off-Broadway
1969	The Cherry Orchard	Ranveskaya	Williamstown Theatre Festival
1970	The Three Sisters	Olga	Williamstown Theatre Festival
1973	The Good Woman of Setzuan	Shen Te	Williamstown Theatre Festival
1973	Baba Goya	Goya	The American Place Theatre, Off-Broadway
1973	Nourish the Beast	Goya	Cherry Lane Theatre, Off-Broadway
1974	The Seagull	Pauline Andreyevna	Williamstown Theatre Festival
1974	Who's Who In Hell	Ilse	Lunt-Fontanne Theatre, Broadway
1975	Enemies	Tatiana	Williamstown Theatre Festival
1976	Orpheus Descending	Lady Torrance	Williamstown Theatre Festival
1978	Curse of the Starving Class	Ella	The Public Theater, Off-Broadway
1984	Peer Gynt	Aase	Williamstown Theatre Festival
1985	The Marriage of Bette and Boo	Soot Hudlocke	The Public Theater, Off-Broadway
1986	Social Security	Sophie Greengrass	Ethel Barrymore Theatre, Broadway
1989	Mother Courage And Her Children	Mother Courage	Williamstown Theatre Festival
1995	The Hope Zone	Countess	Circle Repertory Theatre, Off-Broadway
1996	The Milk Train Doesn't Stop Here Anymore	Flora Goforth	Williamstown Theatre Festival
1998	Hecuba	Hecuba	Williamstown Theatre Festival
1998	The Lear Project	King Lear	Shakespeare & Company
2000	Rose	Rose	Lyceum Theatre, Broadway
2002	For The Pleasure of Seeing Her Again	Nana	Williamstown Theatre Festival
2003	The Chekhov Cycle	Marina	Williamstown Theatre Festival
2005	A Mother, A Daughter and a Gun	Beatrice	New World Stages, Off-Broadway
2006	70, Girls, 70	Ida Dodd	New York City Center, Off-Broadway
2009	The Singing Forest	Loë Rieman	The Public Theater, Off-Broadway
2011	Vigil	Aunt Grace	Mark Taper Forum, Los Angeles
2011	The Milk Train Doesn't Stop Here Anymore	Flora Goforth	Roundabout Theatre Company, Off-Broadway
2012	Elektra	Chorus Leader	American Conservatory Theater
