= Second Best (2004 film) =

- DVD cover
- Directed by: Eric Weber
- Written by: Eric Weber
- Produced by: Callum Greene; Anthony Katagas; Joe Pantoliano
- Starring: Joe Pantoliano; Jennifer Tilly; Boyd Gaines; Bronson Pinchot; Barbara Barrie; Polly Draper
- Cinematography: Chris Norr
- Edited by: Craig Cobb
- Music by: Tom O'Brien; Nathan Wilson; John Leccese; Joe Weber
- Release date: 2004
- Running time: 86 minutes
- Country: United States
- Language: English

Second Best is a 2004 American comedy film written and directed by Eric Weber and starring Joe Pantoliano, Jennifer Tilly, Boyd Gaines, Bronson Pinchot, Barbara Barrie and Polly Draper.

== Cast ==
- Joe Pantoliano as Elliot
- Jennifer Tilly as Carole
- Boyd Gaines as Richard
- Barbara Barrie as Dorothea
- Polly Draper as Paula
- Bronson Pinchot as Doc Klingenstein
- Peter Gerety as Marshall
- Matthew Arkin as Gerald
- James Ryan as Anthony
- Paulina Porizkova as Allison
- Patty Hearst as Alana
- Fiona Gallagher as Tiffany

== Reception ==
The film has a 44% rating on Rotten Tomatoes based on 16 reviews. Ed Gonzalez of Slant Magazine awarded the film one and a half stars out of four.
