= Louis Zorich =

American actor (1924–2018)

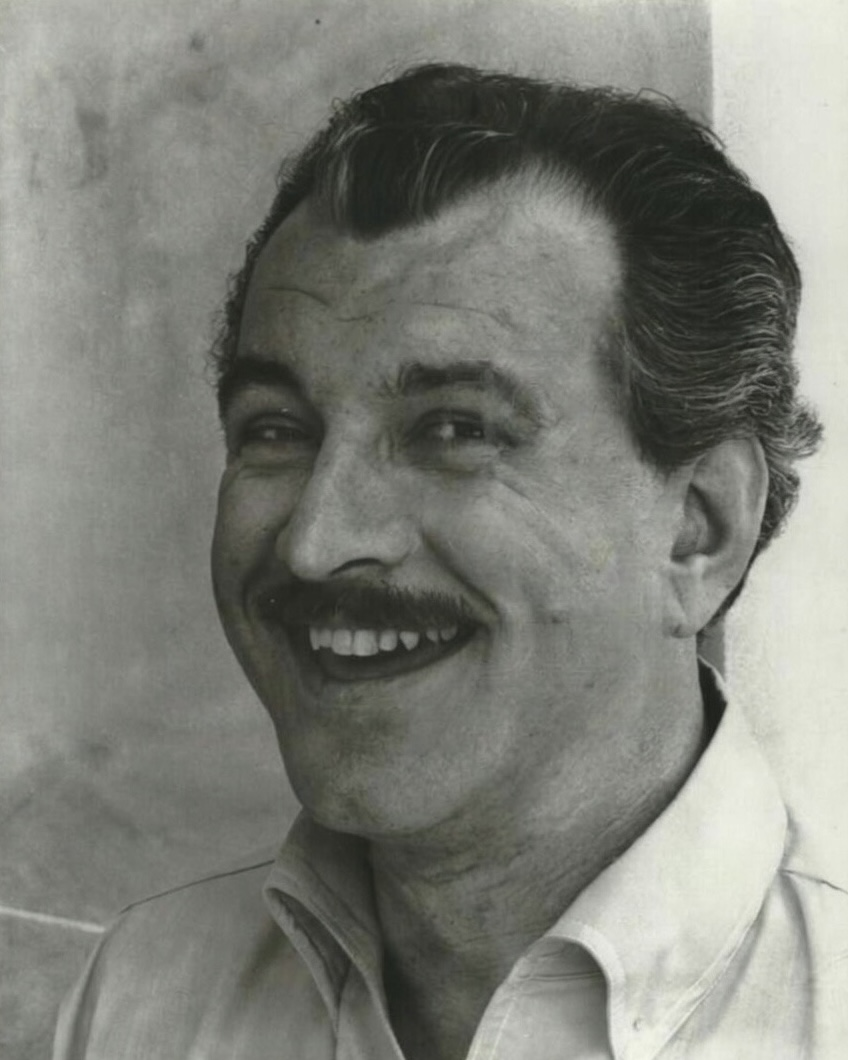
- Zorich in 1968
- Born: February 12, 1924; Chicago, Illinois, U.S.
- Died: January 30, 2018 (aged 93); Manhattan, New York City, U.S.
- Education: Roosevelt University (BA); Art Institute of Chicago (BFA)
- Occupations: Actor; musician
- Years active: 1958–2016
- Spouse: Olympia Dukakis (m. 1962)
- Children: 3
- Relatives: Chris Zorich (nephew)

Louis Zorich (February 12, 1924 – January 30, 2018) was an American actor and musician who performed on stage, in films, and television. In film, he appeared in Fiddler on the Roof. On television, he may be best known for portraying sporting goods salesman Burt Buchman, Paul Buchman's father, on the NBC series Mad About You from 1993 to 1999.

== Early years ==
Zorich was born in Chicago, Illinois, the son of Serbian immigrants. He attended Earle Elementary School before going on to attend Roosevelt University and Goodman School of Drama at the Art Institute of Chicago (now at DePaul University) in his hometown of Chicago. Louis's nephew, Chris Zorich, played professional football.

Zorich served in the U.S. Army during World War II.

== Theatre ==
Zorich appeared in two productions, in Inherit The Wind (1958) and My Three Angels (1959), at the Crest Theatre in Toronto, Canada. Zorich made his Broadway debut in 1961 in Becket starring Laurence Olivier and Anthony Quinn. In 1969, he played a "venal Italian cardinal" in Hadrian VII where he was nominated for a Tony Award.

In 1973, Zorich and his wife, the award-winning film and stage actress Olympia Dukakis, founded the Whole Theatre Company in Montclair, New Jersey — that state's first resident professional theater. They operated the theater for 18 years.

In the 1976 revival of They Knew What They Wanted, Zorich played middle-aged Napa Valley grape farmer Tony and was nominated for a Drama Desk Award. Critic Douglas Watt wrote, "Zorich underlines the heartiness, canniness and energy of Tony -- even after he has suffered that crushing wedding-day accident --- in countless shrewd and effective details." He played Mr. Maraczek in the 1993 Broadway musical revival She Loves Me. Critic Frank Scheck wrote, "...Louis Zorich is moving as the store owner trying to cope with the news of his wife's infidelity." Zorich said in 1993, "Actors are by nature introverted, sensitive people, who can lead behind their characters. Every time I walk on that stage I still get nervous."

Zorich was on the faculty of HB Studio in New York City. He also edited the anthology What Have You Done: The Inside Stories of Auditioning from the Ridiculous to the Sublime.

== Film and television ==
Zorich played the Russian Constable in the movie version of Fiddler on the Roof (1971) and a cab dispatcher in the comedy For Pete's Sake (1974).

In The Muppets Take Manhattan (1984), Zorich played a Greek restaurant owner. Vincent Canby of The New York Times wrote, "Louis Zorich is funny as a nice, helpful, harassed coffee-shop owner who feeds the Muppets in their lean days..." In a TV adaptation of Death of a Salesman (1985), he played Ben, the older brother of Willy Loman. Zorich appeared as a millionaire in Dirty Rotten Scoundrels (1988) with Steve Martin, and played a shady murder victim in the TV crime drama series Columbo.

He co-starred in the critically acclaimed comedy TV series Brooklyn Bridge as family patriarch Jules Berger. In a 1993 interview, Zorich was asked which assignment best matched his personality. He said, "I think it would be Jules Bergen, the grandfather I played in Brooklyn Bridge. By nature, I'm rather easygoing and tend to let thing slide." Zorich mentioned that the series "afforded me the type of visibility that you can't always get in the theater..."

== Personal life ==
Zorich was married to Academy Award-winning actress Olympia Dukakis for 56 years, from 1962 until his death. They had three children together. He died at his Manhattan apartment at the age of 93 on January 30, 2018.

== Filmography ==
=== Film ===
Year	Title	Role	Notes
1966	Gamera, the Giant Monster	Russian Ambassador	
1968	What's So Bad About Feeling Good?		Uncredited
1968	Coogan's Bluff	Taxi Driver	
1969	Popi	Penebaz	
1971	Cold Turkey	Douglas Truesdale	Uncredited
1971	They Might Be Giants	2nd Sanitation Man	
1971	Fiddler on the Roof	Constable	
1971	Made for Each Other	Pandora's Father	
1973	The Don Is Dead	Mitch DiMorra	
1974	The Rehearsal		
1974	For Pete's Sake	Nick	
1974	Newman's Law	Frank Lo Falcone	
1974	Sunday in the Country	Dinelli	
1976	W.C. Fields and Me	Gene Fowler	
1977	A Good Dissonance Like a Man	George W. Chadwick	
1977	The Other Side of Midnight	Demonides	
1980	The Changeling	Stewart Adler	Uncredited
1980	Up the Academy	Sheik Amier	
1984	The Muppets Take Manhattan	Pete	
1985	Walls of Glass	Lerner	
1986	Club Paradise	Swiss Businessman	
1986	Where Are the Children?	Kragopoulos	
1988	Cheap Shots	Louie Constantine	
1988	Dirty Rotten Scoundrels	Greek Millionaire	
1989	Bloodhounds of Broadway	Mindy	
1991	City of Hope	Mayor Baci	
1991	Missing Pieces	Ochenko	
1997	Commandments	Rudy Warner	
1997	Kiss & Tell	Louis	
1998	A Fish in the Bathtub	Morris	
1999	Joe the King	Judge	
2001	Friends & Family	Marvin Levine	
2004	A Hole in One	Sammy	
2007	Running Funny	Stan	
2009	Run It	Angelo	
2011	Detachment	Grandpa	
2011	A Bird of the Air	Stowalski	
2011	The Talk Man	Lou	
2015	Emily & Tim	Tim Hanratty	Segment: "Attachment"
2016	No Pay, Nudity	Lester's Father	(final film role)

=== Television ===
Year	Title	Role	Notes
1958	The Double Cure	Jules	TV movie
1977	Kojak	Mike DeBrieno	1 episode
1981	Ryan's Hope	Detective Oliver Jones	13 episodes
1985	Death of a Salesman	Ben Loman	TV movie
1987	The Equalizer	Zeke	Episode: "Carnal Persuasion"
1987–1988	As the World Turns	Inspector Haniotis	5 episodes
1990	Columbo: Agenda for Murder	Frank Staplin	TV movie
1990	Law & Order	Judge Milton Erdheim	Episode: "Indifference"
1991–1993	Brooklyn Bridge	Jules Berger	33 episodes
1993–1999	Mad About You	Burt Buchman	69 episodes
1995	Law & Order	Judge Edgar Hynes	Episode: "Jeopardy"
2004	The Jury	Samuel Abrams	1 episode
