= The Big Knife (play) =

American play by Clifford Odets

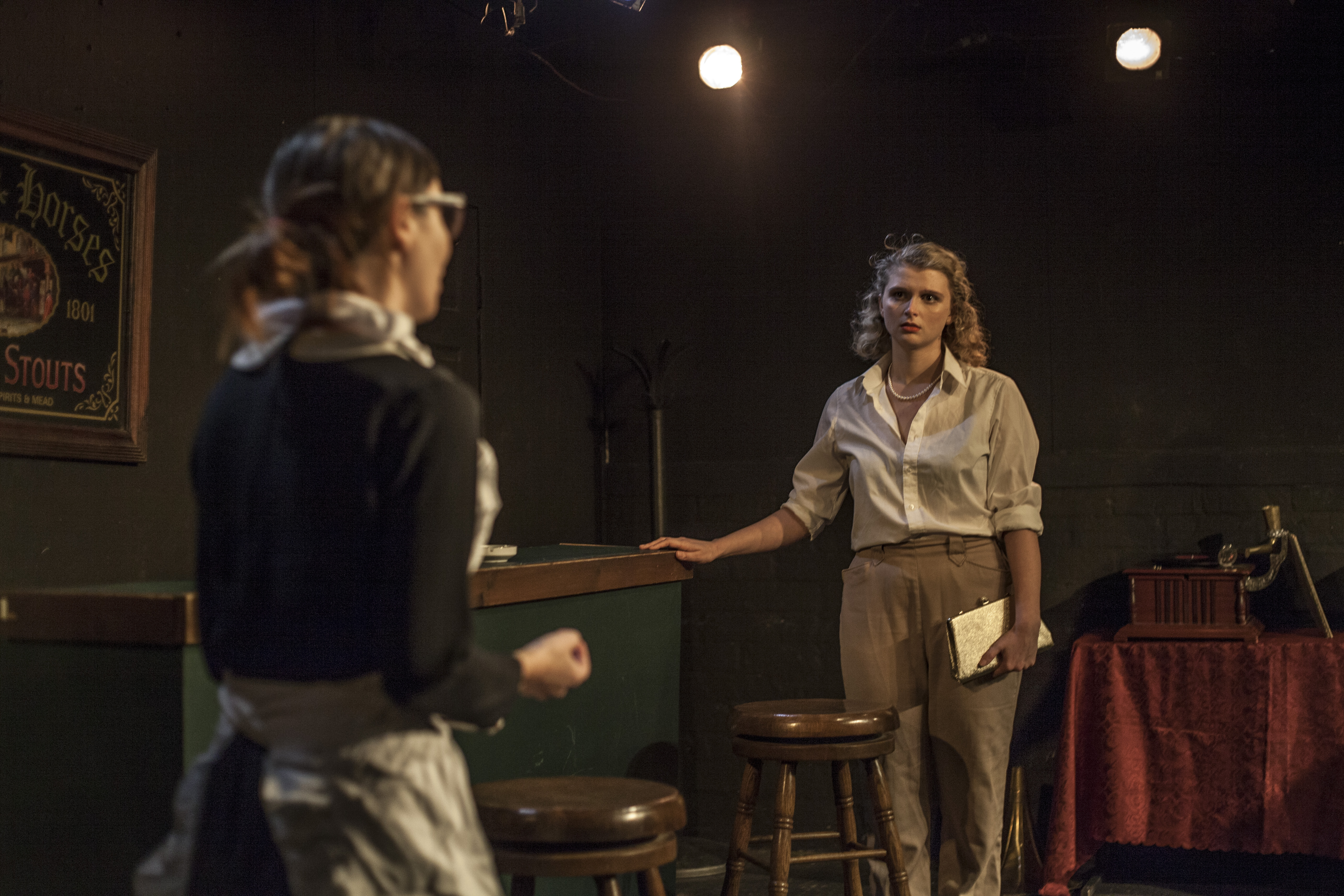
- Stella Adler Academy of Acting and Theatre production of The Big Knife (2019)
- Original language: English
- Written by: Clifford Odets
- Characters: Charlie Castle, Marcus Hoff, Marion Castle, Buddy Bliss, et al.
- Subject: Corrupting influence of money
- Genre: Drama
- Setting: Beverly Hills, California

Premiere
- Date: 1949
- Place: National Theatre

The Big Knife is an American play by Clifford Odets. The original production was directed by Lee Strasberg, who had worked with Odets at the Group Theatre, and starring fellow Group Theatre alumnus John Garfield. The play debuted at Broadway's National Theatre on 24 February 1949 before closing on May 28 after 109 performances. The Big Knife marked the return of Odets to Broadway after a six-year hiatus in which he toiled in Hollywood as a screenwriter and motion picture director. The play concerns the disillusionment of a movie star with Hollywood's studio system and disgust with himself, as he has lost his idealism in the pursuit of success.

== Plot ==
Garfield played major movie star Charlie Castle, whose idealistic wife Marion has left him. She has warned him not to sign a new contract with studio boss Marcus Hoff, or she will not return to him. Hoff has covered up a fatal hit-and-run committed by Castle, and he threatens Castle with the revelation of his secret if he does not sign the contract. Castle signs the contract, but subsequently commits suicide with the knowledge that he can never reclaim his lost idealism that he had sacrificed for success.

== Original production ==
The show premiered at the National Theatre on February 24, 1949, directed by Strasberg, set design Howard Bay, and costume design Lucille Little. The cast starred Frank H. Wilson (Russell), William Terry (Buddy Bliss), John Garfield (Charlie Castle), Leona Powers (Patty Benedict), Nancy Kelly (Marion Castle), Reinhold Schünzel (Nat Danzinger), J. Edward Bromberg (Marcus Hoff), Paul McGrath (Smiley Cox), Mary Patton (Connie Bliss), Theodore Newton (Hank Teagle), Joan McCracken (Dixie Evans), and John McKee (Dr. Frary).

== Reviews ==
New York Times theater critic Brooks Atkinson, in his review of the opening, admired the "distinguished art and craftsmanship" on display. He praised Strasberg's direction, the acting and the production design and lauded Odets' "uncommon theatre talents". However, Atkinson found the play to be a melodrama that could not support Odets' indictment of American society and his attempt to pass off the dilemma of the play's protagonist as a tragedy, seeing as the cast of Hollywood characters are "a singularly undistinguished and unattractive society of egotists, racketeers, cheats and dimwits."

Atkinson summed up Odets' theme seemingly as being "a study of the immorality of success as measured solely by money; and he is showing how the conspiracy of money destroys those who work for it." He wrote "[T]he characters in The Big Knife are not worth so much of Mr. Odets' indignation on so cosmic a plane. As in a soundly motivated melodrama, they get what they deserve in the final act. There is no point in crying doom for the entire nation."

== Off Broadway revival ==
The play marked the directorial debut of Peter Bogdanovich, who acquired the rights at the age of 19. His revival Off Broadway ran for 63 performances in 1959. It featured a young Carroll O'Connor.

== Movie and Broadway revival ==
The play was made into a 1955 film directed by Robert Aldrich. It was also made into a 1988 television film directed by John Jacobs.

The Big Knife has had one revival on Broadway, in 2013. The play, produced by the Roundabout Theatre Company, opened at the American Airlines Theatre on April 16, 2013, after previews from March 22, and closed on June 2, after 29 previews and 56 performances. Directed by Doug Hughes, the play featured Bobby Cannavale, Marin Ireland, and Richard Kind, who played the venal studio boss Marcus Hoff.

Kind was nominated for a Tony Award for Best Performance by an Actor in a Featured Role in a Play and won a Drama Desk Award for Outstanding Featured Actor in a Play.
