= Eric Weber (director) =

American novelist

- Born: August 30, 1942 (age 84)
- Occupations: director; screenwriter; producer; author; advertising executive
- Organization: The Tenafly Film Company
- Title: President

Eric Weber (born August 30, 1942) is a director, screenwriter, producer, author, and advertising executive whose films have been selected by Sundance, SXSW, Palm Springs, Austin, Montreal, Napa, Hamptons, and Bangkok Film Festivals.

Weber is currently the president of The Tenafly Film Company. Through Tenafly, he executive produces Football Town: Valdosta for the NFL Network. He writes, directs, and stars in a webseries "Wingdad" with his son, Nick Weber, in which he plays a fictionalized version of himself as he attempts to teach Nick how to seduce women.

His film Outliving Emily (also known as Emily and Tim), starring Alexis Bledel and Kal Penn was awarded Best Screenplay in the 2015 Rhode Island Film Festival and was nominated for the Grand Prix des Amériques at the Montreal World Film Festival.

Suits, which he wrote and directed, stars Robert Klein and Steve Carell and was acquired for distribution by Taurus Entertainment and was featured on HBO and Showtime.

Second Best also written and directed by Weber, stars Joe Pantoliano and Jennifer Tilly. It was an official selection at Sundance, Austin, and The Hamptons Film Festivals. The New York Times called it, "A funny bitter understanding of male competition and ego. This smart-enough-to-make-you-squirm comedy is ripe with brutal honesty and perverse glee."

While working as an ad writer, he penned the international bestseller How To Pick Up Girls in 1968. It sold over 3 million copies and was translated into more than 20 languages and is credited with kickstarting the seduction community. He has published over 30 books through his company, Symphony Press.

Two of these books have been turned into films, How to Pick Up Girls! (an ABC movie of the week) and a novel, Separate Vacations (a Robert Lantos Production).

In advertising, he served as Executive Creative Director and Executive vice-chairman at Young & Rubicam, creating ad campaigns, including "Be A Pepper" for Dr. Pepper and "Betcha Bite A Chip" for Chips Ahoy Cookies.
