= Richard Kind =

American actor (born 1956)

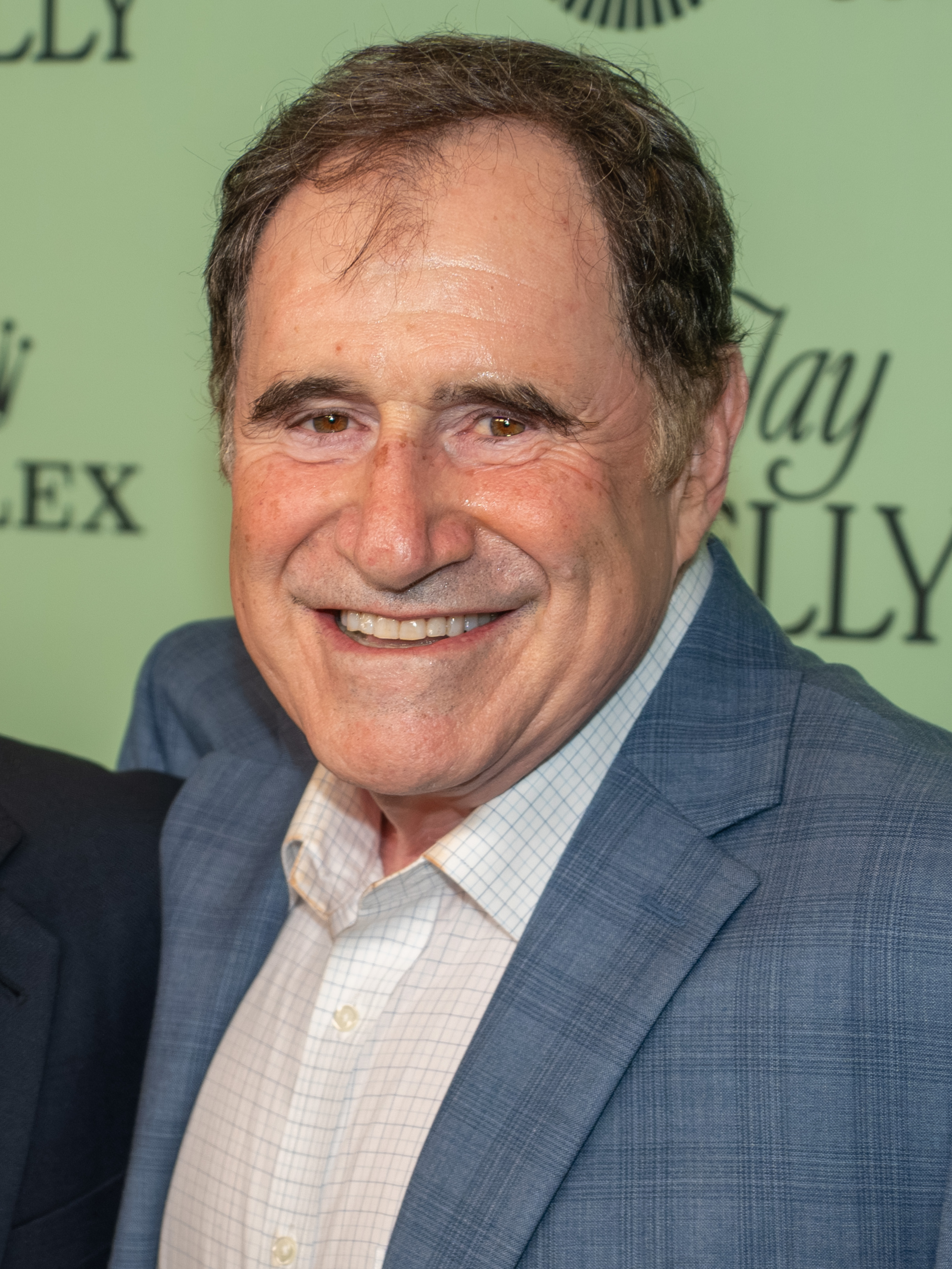
- Kind at the 2025 New York Film Festival
- Born: Richard Bruce Kind; November 22, 1956 (age 69); Trenton, New Jersey, U.S.
- Education: Northwestern University (BA)
- Occupations: Actor; comedian
- Years active: 1978–present
- Notable work: Richard Kind filmography
- Spouse: Dana Stanley (m. 1999; div. 2018)
- Children: 3

Richard Bruce Kind (/kaɪnd/; born November 22, 1956) is an American actor and comedian. His television roles include Dr. Mark Devanow in Mad About You (1992–1999, 2019), Paul Lassiter in Spin City (1996–2002), Cousin Andy in Curb Your Enthusiasm (2002–2021), Sam Meyers in Red Oaks (2014–2017), and Vince Fish in Only Murders in the Building (2024–present). He appeared in the films Clifford (1994), Stargate (1994), The Station Agent (2003), The Visitor (2007), A Serious Man (2009), Hereafter (2010), Argo (2012), Bombshell (2019), Tick, Tick... Boom! (2021), Beau is Afraid (2023), and The Out-Laws (2023). Kind is currently the announcer and sidekick on the Netflix live talk show Everybody's Live with John Mulaney.

Kind's voice performances in various Pixar films include Molt in A Bug's Life (1998), Van in the first two films of the Cars franchise (2006–2011), Bookworm in Toy Story 3 (2010), and Bing Bong in Inside Out (2015). He also voices Al Tuttle in the series American Dad! (2005–present) and Marty Glouberman in the Netflix series Big Mouth (2017–2025). Kind was nominated for a Tony Award for Best Featured Actor in a Play for his performance as Marcus Hoff in the 2013 Broadway revival of The Big Knife.

== Early life ==
Kind was born in Trenton, New Jersey. He is the son of Alice, a homemaker, and Samuel Kind, a jeweler who formerly owned La Vake's Jewelry in Princeton. His family is of Russian Jewish origin and his ancestors lived in the Pale of Settlement region of the Russian Empire. His great grandfather Hyman Berson immigrated to the Lower East Side of Manhattan, New York City and worked as a peddler before running a crayon factory. Berson was murdered in 1933 along with his nephew. One of his business partners was accused of the crime. When Kind was in the fourth grade, he moved with his family to Yardley, Pennsylvania, where he grew up alongside his younger sister, Joanne. He attended Pennsbury High School in Fairless Hills with fellow actor Robert Curtis Brown, graduating in 1974. In 1978, he graduated from Northwestern University, where he was in the fraternity Sigma Alpha Epsilon. After four years in New York City, he returned to Chicago where he joined other Northwestern alumni in the Practical Theatre Company. In 1983, during one of their productions, he was recruited to The Second City by co-founder Bernard Sahlins, from which he is an alumnus.

== Career ==
=== Television ===
Kind was an ensemble member in Carol Burnett’s short lived variety show, Carol & Company (1990-1991). Kind then portrayed Dr. Mark Devanow on Mad About You (1992-99), throughout the show's run, and played the role of Paul Lassiter on Spin City (1996-2002). Kind and Michael Boatman were the only two actors to appear in every episode of Spin City. Kind reprised his role in the 2019 revival of Mad About You.

He appeared in eight episodes of Larry David's Curb Your Enthusiasm, between 2002 and 2021 as Larry's cousin Andy. In 2006, he guest starred as Lucius Lavin in Stargate Atlantis, in the episodes "Irresistible" and "Irresponsible."

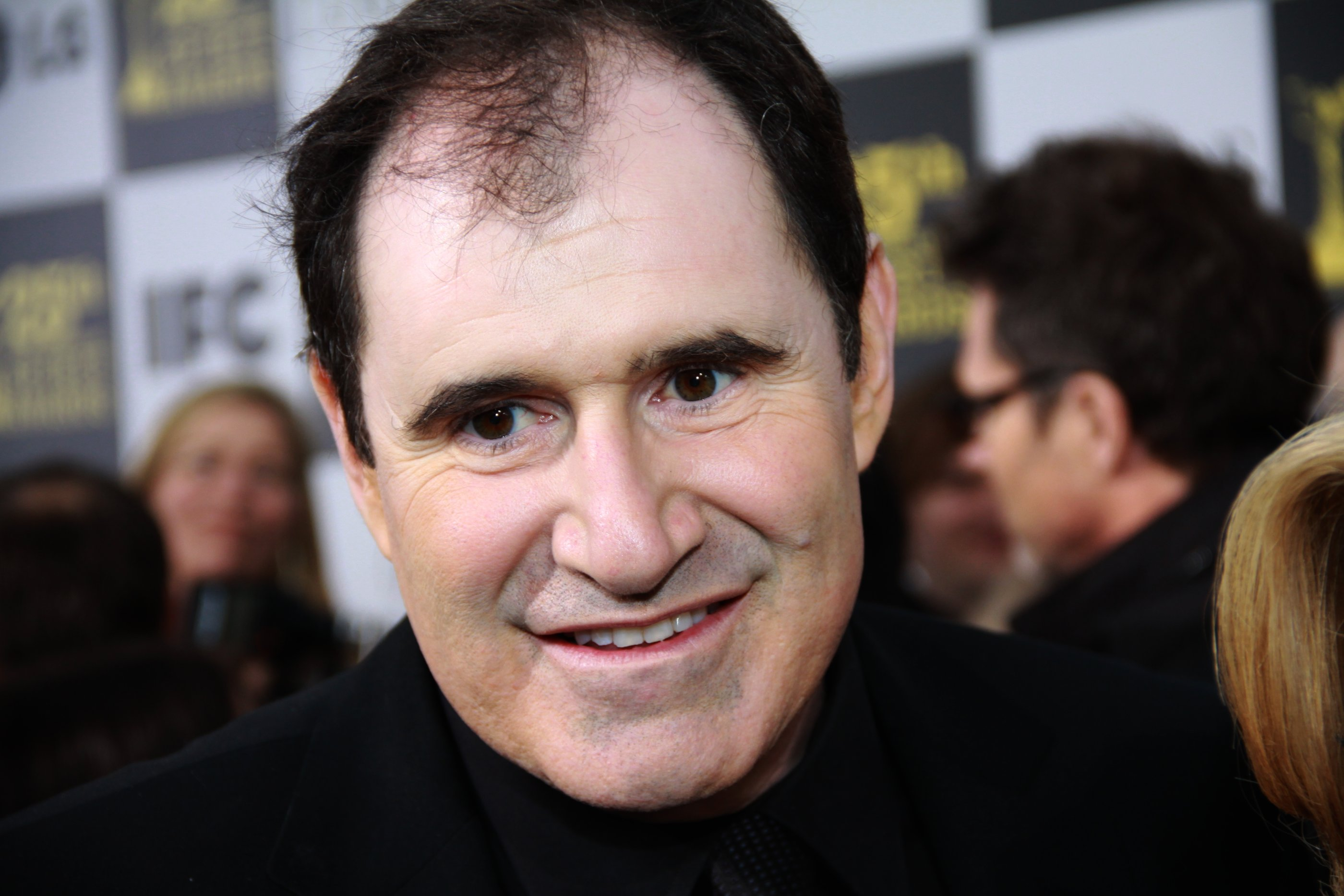
Kind at the Independent Spirit Awards in Los Angeles, California in 2010

Kind had a recurring role in Scrubs, as Harvey Corman, an annoying hypochondriac, who claimed that having the same name as Harvey Korman did not "get [him] as much action as you may think". He also played a role on USA's crime comedy Psych as Hugo, an astronomer who killed a partner for credit for the discovery of a planet ("From the Earth to the Starbucks"), and later on Law & Order: Criminal Intent as a wealthy philanthropist who kills his sister-in-law and niece to protect the money he uses to fund his philanthropic work ("Privilege"). Kind guest-starred on the Disney Channel series Even Stevens, where he played the fun-loving but irresponsible Uncle Chuck. He appeared in an episode of CBS's Two and a Half Men with former Spin City co-star Charlie Sheen on November 12, 2007. He also played a small role on TNT's hit show Leverage playing the part of a corrupt mayor in the second season two-part finale. Kind guest-starred episode "The Worst", playing the corrupt DEA officer Special Agent Schwartz in the Netflix series Disjointed.

He played the role of burnt spy Jesse's ex-boss Marv in three episodes of season 4 of Burn Notice. In 2011, Kind guest-starred in an episode of the ABC sitcom Mr. Sunshine as Rod the Bod. He starred in the HBO series Luck until its cancellation, and he is also the spokesman for On-Cor frozen foods. In February 2013, he made a guest appearance on Kroll Show.

In 2015, he played the GED instructor on Unbreakable Kimmy Schmidt and Mayor Aubrey James in Gotham.

In 2022, Kind starred as police captain Stan Yenko on the CBS police procedural crime drama East New York, which was cancelled after its first season. In 2023, he played Saint Peter in Mel Brooks's History of the World, Part II.

In 2026, Kind will star in the Hallmark Channel/Disney television film Holiday Ever After: A Disney World Wish Come True.

=== Film ===
Kind had a minor role as Dr. Gary Meyers, an archaeologist who translated the symbols on the Stargate prior to James Spader's character's involvement in the 1994 movie Stargate. He appeared in the film National Lampoon's Bag Boy in 2007. Kind played David's father in the Prime series "Red Oaks".

In 2007, Kind played a short role in the indie film The Visitor, as Richard Jenkins's neighbor, Jacob. Kind starred in the independent black comedy feature, The Understudy in 2008. In 2008, Kind performed the role of Voltaire in the New York City Opera production of Leonard Bernstein's Candide. Kind played the major supporting role of Arthur Gopnik in the Coen brothers' dark comedy film A Serious Man. He had a small role in Clint Eastwood's Hereafter as Christos Andryo, in 2010. In 2011, he played a supporting dramatic role as Mr. Camp in the feature film Fancypants. In 2012, he was featured in Divorce Invitation.

Actor/director George Clooney is a close friend, and was best man at Kind's wedding to Dana Stanley in 1999. Kind later went on to play the part of a casting director in Clooney's directorial debut Confessions of a Dangerous Mind. Kind also played himself in the short-lived HBO series Unscripted, which Clooney executive produced and directed with Grant Heslov, and played a small role in the film Argo, as screenwriter Max Klein, which was produced by both Clooney and Heslov. He also had a supporting role in Ari Aster's horror film Beau Is Afraid (2023). In 2024 Kind starred in Night Session, an award-winning short film directed by long-time Late Show producer Ballard C. Boyd.

=== Theater ===
Kind created the role of Addison Mizner in Stephen Sondheim's Bounce, and has appeared on Broadway in The Tale of the Allergist's Wife (2000), The Producers (2002), and Sly Fox (2004). He also appeared as the "Jury Foreman" in the film The Producers (2005) and played the lead role of Max Bialystock in a Hollywood Bowl production during July 27–29, 2012. He played Pseudolus in A Funny Thing Happened on the Way to the Forum at the Sondheim Center for the Performing Arts in Fairfield, Iowa. Kind received a Tony Award nomination for his role in the 2013 Broadway production of The Big Knife. Kind has performed in radio/audio plays for the LA Theatre Works and the Hollywood Theater of the Ear. He has appeared in the West End in Guys and Dolls (2016) and The Producers (2026). In 2026, Richard appeared as Edna Turnblad in Hairspray for The Muny's 108th season.

=== Voice work ===
His voice credits include Tom in Tom and Jerry: The Movie, Molt in Disney/Pixar's A Bug's Life, Van in Disney/Pixar's Cars, and Cars 2, Bookworm in Toy Story 3, the narrator for Disney's Go Baby, and Larry the Anaconda in The Wild. In 2000 he did the voice of Mr. Dobbins in Tom Sawyer. In 2001–2002, he voiced the character of Pongo in five episodes of the animated series Oswald. He had a recurring role on the Disney Channel series Kim Possible as the villain Frugal Lucre. He guest starred in The Penguins of Madagascar as Roger the Alligator in the episodes "Haunted Habitat", "Roger Dodger", "Gator Watch", "April Fools", "The All Nighter Before Christmas", and "Operation: Neighbor Swap". He also played the role of Gumbo in an episode of Chowder on Cartoon Network. Kind guest-starred in Phineas and Ferb in the episode "Perry the Actorpus" as the Totally Tools executive. For audio drama, he appeared in three episodes of Around the Sun. In 2021, he narrated several commercials for Freestyle Libre, a device for diabetes patients to monitor their glucose levels.

Kind voiced Riley's imaginary friend Bing Bong in Pixar's Inside Out. He provides the voice of Olly and Saraline's dad Harvey Timbers in Welcome to the Wayne. In 2021, he voiced the Doopler on Star Trek: Lower Decks.

== Personal life ==
Kind was married to Dana Stanley from 1999 to 2018. They have three children: a son, Max, and two daughters, Samantha and Skylar.

Kind resides on the Upper West Side of Manhattan in New York City.

He was inducted into the Pennsbury High School Hall of Fame in the inaugural class on October 13, 2022.

Prior to landing his role on ER, George Clooney stayed at Kind’s apartment in Los Angeles. While living there, Clooney played numerous pranks on Kind including one culminating with Clooney defecating in Kind's cat's litter box. Clooney also duped Kind into thinking he was both a Jeopardy expert and an aspiring painter.

== Discography ==
- Bounce: Original Cast Recording (2004)
- Original Cast Album: Co-Op (Lakeshore Records, 2019)

== Awards and nominations ==
Year	Award	Category	Nominated work	Result	Ref.
1995	Actor Awards	Outstanding Ensemble in a Comedy Series	Mad About You	Nominated	
2009	Gotham Awards	Best Ensemble Performance	A Serious Man	Nominated	
2009	Boston Society of Film Critics	Best Ensemble Cast	A Serious Man	Nominated	
2010	Independent Spirit Awards	Robert Altman Award	A Serious Man	Won	
2013	Tony Awards	Best Featured Actor in a Play	The Big Knife	Nominated	
2013	Drama Desk Awards	Best Featured Actor in a Play	The Big Knife	Won	
2013	Outer Critics Circle Awards	Best Featured Actor in a Play	The Big Knife	Nominated	
2025	Actor Awards	Outstanding Ensemble in a Comedy Series	Only Murders in the Building	Won	
