= Jowee Omicil =

Canadian jazz musician (born 1977)

Jowee Omicil aka Mr. BasH!
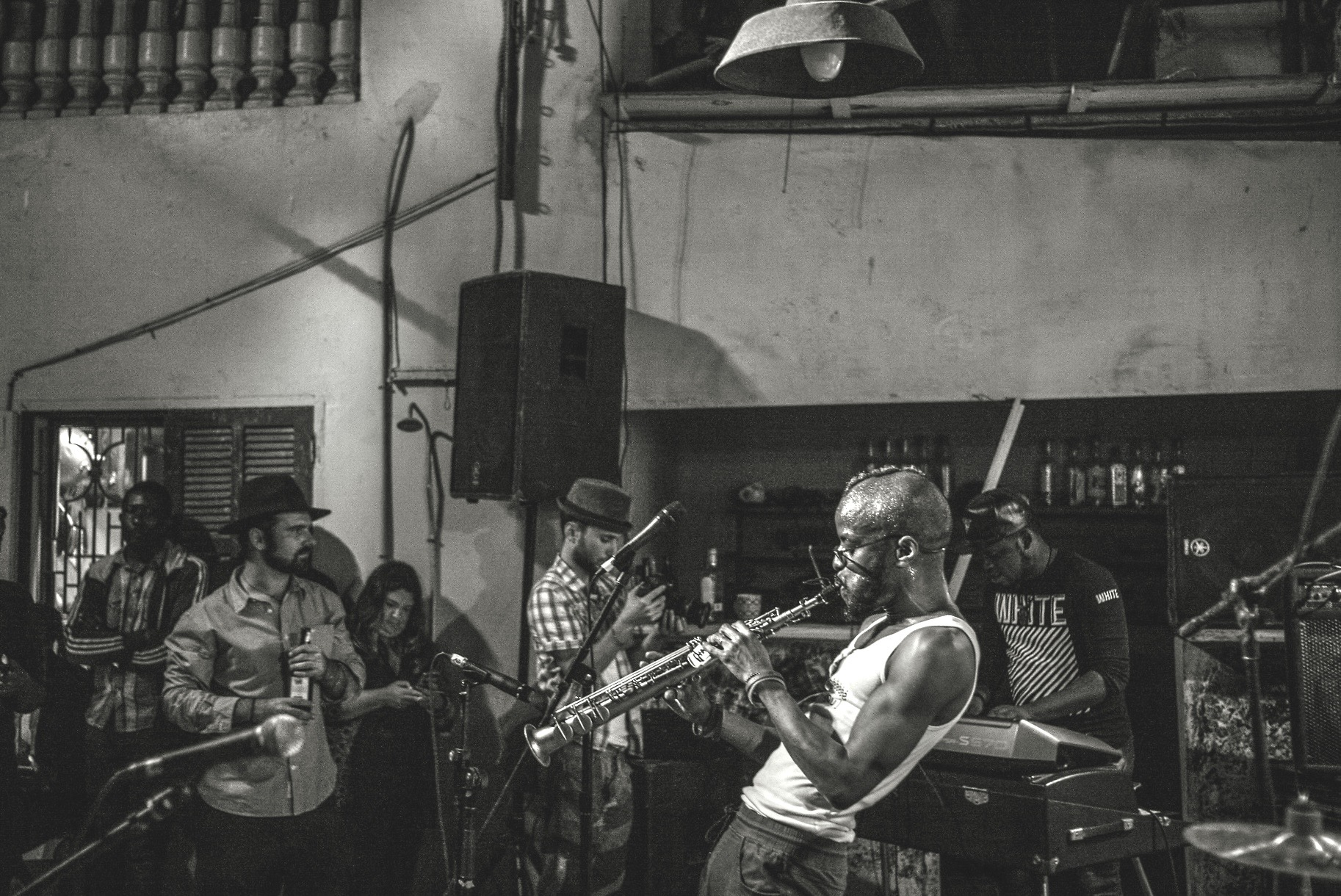
- Jowee Omicil performing at Bastion Pirate in Dakar, May 20, 2017.

Background information
- Born: Joseph Omicil Jr. December 1, 1977 (age 48); Montreal, Quebec, Canada
- Genres: | genre =: Jazz; Jazz fusion; Free jazz; Kompa; Caribbean; Hip hop
- Occupations: Musician; Composer; Record producer
- Instruments: Soprano, Alto & Tenor Saxophone; Soprano & Bass Clarinet; Electronic Sax, Piccolo Flute; Piano; Beatmaker; Voice; Cornet & Trumpet; Electric Bass...
- Years active: 1995–present
- Labels: BasH! Village Records; Jazz Village; BBjuiss Records; Bakfoul Records; Jowee Juise Inc.
- Website: joweeo.com bashakademy.com bashvillagerecords.com

Joseph Omicil Jr, known professionally as Jowee Omicil aka Mr. BasH!, is a Haitian-Canadian jazz musician. He has worked in the past with artists such as Randy Kerber, André 3000, Tony Allen, Jacob Desvarieux, Roy Hargrove, Ibrahim Maalouf, Glen Ballard, Saul Williams and Francisco Mela. Born in Montreal, Omicil spends his time between Miami and Paris.

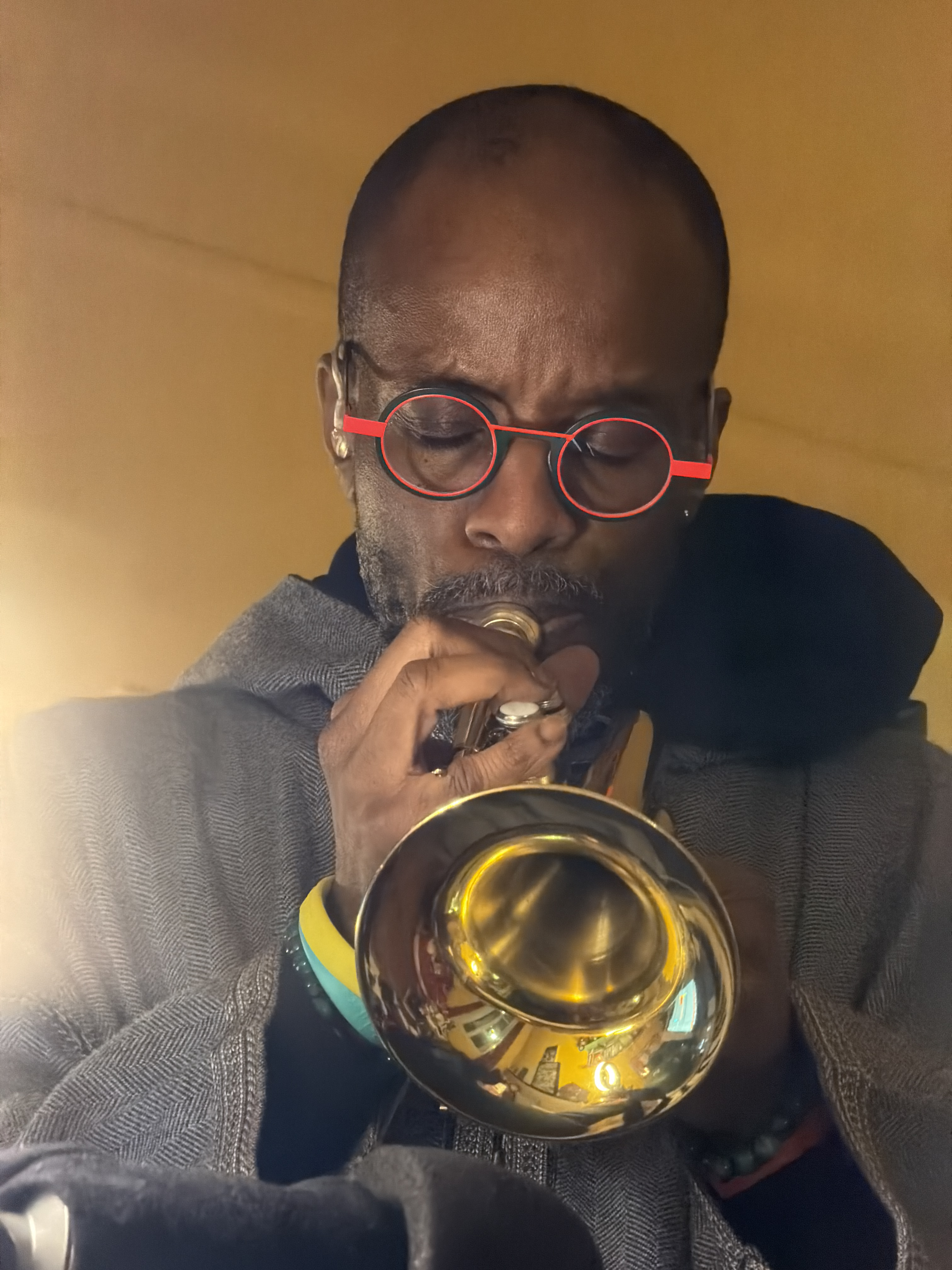
Jowee Omicil composing music at his studio in Paris, December 23, 2025.

== Early life and education ==
Jowee Omicil was born to Rose-Annette Innocent and Joseph C. Omicil, a pastor. Omicil's mother passed when he was only 5 years old. Omicil was 15 when his father enrolled him in music school, much to his own surprise. His father's intent was to have him learn an instrument to accompany the church choir. Omicil chose the alto saxophone after being dissuaded from his first choice of piano, which too many students had already chosen. Three years into his studies Omicil was offered a scholarship to the prestigious Berklee College of Music in Boston, where he majored in Music Education. Later on he also attended the Thelonious Monk Institute of Jazz and was among the 20 finalists featured on BET Jazz.

== Career ==
Over the course of his career Omicil has played with a number of prominent musicians such as Branford Marsalis, Richard Bona, Kenny Garrett, Marcus Miller, Pharoah Sanders, Wyclef Jean, Harold Faustin, André 3000, Saul Williams among others. In July 2018 Omicil served as master of ceremonies at a tribute concert celebrating Quincy Jones' 85th birthday at Montreux, Switzerland. Omicil appears in the Damien Chazelle-created Netflix show The Eddy. During the pandemic years of 2020 and 2021 Omicil released a solo album, LeKture, and Y Pati, a duet with the American Hollywood pianist Randy Kerber, whom he met on the set of the series The Eddy. Y Pati was released in December 2020. Also, the "Big In Jazz Collective" was born with the release in July 2021 of the Album Global. At the end of 2020 Jowee returned to the studio with brothers Louis and François Moutin. They recorded M.O.M, which was released in September 2021 on Laborie Jazz Records.

In 2023, Omicil released Spiritual Healing: Bwa Kayiman Freedom Suite a free jazz album inspired by an 18th-century Vodou ceremony held in the woods of Bois Caïman that helped give rise to the Haitian Revolution. When no label would release it, he founded BasH! Village Records, proving authenticity transforms obstacles into triumphs. The suite went on to become one of the year's most celebrated releases, praised by The Guardian, BBC, Jazzwise, Jazzthing among many others.

Later, he released sMiLes, his eleventh album, on 11 November 2025. The album, accompanied by Omicil's podcast The PoDBasH! over 11 months, features 11 tracks plus a bonus piece and includes a collaboration with Canadian-Haitian vocalist Dominique Fils-Aimé. sMiLes continues Omicil's exploration of jazz, free improvisation, hip hop, Haitian roots, and, as Gilles Peterson describes, his BasH! Energy Music. “sMiLes” got selected among the finalists for France's “Prix Joséphine,” an award that celebrates genre-defying, diverse and creative music, and earned wide acclaim in international publications like like Rolling Stone, Die Zeit, Downbeat Magazine, FIP, France Inter/Radio France, Jazz Times, L'Humanité and many more.

Two more albums follow in 2026: “OM,” a blueprint of Afro-Caribbean jazz duet with Francisco Mela, and “Chi Va PiaNo,” a solo piano album he himself has long been longing to release.

Aside from music, Jowee Omicil expresses his artistry on screen, appearing in Damien Chazelle's Netflix series “The Eddy,” and portraying Sammy Davis Jr. in “Mr. Aznavour” alongside Tahar Rahim.

As a mentor at the Montreux Academy, he passed his knowledge on to the next generation of talented musicians. He later founded his own BasH! AkademY, a nomadic school with no fixed home, through which he now encourages students and audiences toward self-expression.

== Discography ==
Year	Title	Label	Featured personnel
2026	Chi Va PiaNo	BasH! Village Records/Modulor	Jowee Omicil solo Piano
2026	OM	BasH! Village Records/Modulor	Jowee Omicil, Francisco Mela
2025	sMiLes	BasH! Village Records/Modulor	Jowee Omicil; Dominique Fils-Aimé; Randy Kerber Mawuena Kodjovi; Jonathan Jurion; Malika Zarra; Ludovic Louis, Jendah Manga; Yoann Danier; Damien Nueva; Arnaud Dolmen; Ella-Billi BasH!
2023	Spiritual Healing: Bwa Kayiman Freedom Suite	BasH!Village Records/Modulor	Jowee Omicil; Yoann Danier; Arnaud Dolmen; Randy Kerber
2021	M.O.M	Laborie Jazz	Jowee Omicil (clarinet, alto sax, soprano sax, tenor sax); Louis Moutin (drums); François Moutin (bass); Recorded at STUDIO SEXTAN (Malakoff), mixed and recorded by Julien Birot
2021	BIG IN JAZZ COLLECTIVE « GLOBAL »	Comité Martiniquais De La Musique / Junzy Productions	Jowee Omicil (alto saxophones, soprano sax, tenor sax); Sonny Troupé (drums); Tilo Bertholo (drums); Stephane Castry (electric bass) Ludovic Louis (trumpet); Maher Beauroy (piano); Ralph Lavital (guitar); Yann Négrit (guitar); Recorded at STUDIO DE MEUDON by Julien Basseres, mixed and mastered by Auguste Manly
2020	Y PATI	Komos Records	Jowee Omicil (cornet, clarinets, piccolo, alto sax, soprano sax, tenor sax, vocals); Randy Kerber (piano); Recorded at STUDIO PIGALLE (Paris), mixed and mastered by Felix Remy
2020	LeKture	BasH! Village	Jowee Omicil: all instruments (alto, soprano, ténor, track producing, piano, vocals...); Recorded in THE LAB (Paris) by Jowee BasH! Omicil, mixed and mastered by Edouard Carbonne
2018	Love Matters!	Jazz Village Pias	Jowee Omicil (cornet, piccolo, soprano, alto, vocals); Laurent Emmanuel Tilo Bertholo (drums); Kona Khasu (electric bass) Jeffrey Deen (percussion, voice); Jean-Philippe Dary (piano); Jonathan Jurion (piano); Justwody Cereyon (acoustic bass); Conti Belong (drums); Jendah Manga (electric bass); Michel Alibo (bass); Recorded at LA BUISSONNE (Pernes-Les-Fontaines, France), mixed and mastered by Gerard De Haro and Nicolas Baillard
2017	Let's BasH	Jazz Village Pias	Jowee Omicil (Rhodes, vocals, piccolo, alto sax, soprano sax, clarinet); Laurent Emmanuel Tilo Bertholo (drums); Kona Khasu (electric bass) Jeffrey Deen (percussion, voice); Jean-Philippe Dary (piano); Jonathan Jurion (piano); Nenah Gajin (guitar); Justwody Cereyon (acoustic bass); Conti Belong (drums); Leonor De Haro (clarinet) Jendah Manga (electric bass); Michel Alibo (bass); Recorded at LA BUISSONNE (Pernes-Les-Fontaines, France), mixed and mastered by Gerard De Haro and Nicolas Baillard
2014	Naked	BBjuiss Records & Bakfoul Records	Jowee Omicil (clarinet, tenor, alto, soprano, piccolo, didgeridoo, Rhodes, vocals); Jeffrey Deen (tabla, halo, hapi); Ti Wes St-Louis (vocals, tanbou, conga); Carlos Alabaci (double bass); James Quilan (double bass); Michael Piolet (drums); Harold St-Louis (Rhodes); Recorded at THE RIVIERA THEATRE (Miami), mixed and mastered by Felipe Tichauer
2009	Roots and Grooves	BBjuiss Records	Jowee Omicil (clarinet, alto, soprano, vocals) features: Lionel Loueke, Mawuena Kodjovi, Francisco Mela, Nir Felder, Jeremy Pelt, Nedelka, Markus Scwartz, Émeline Michel, Val-Inc, Kona Khasu, Patrick Andriantsialonina, Manny Laine, Johnny Mercier, Harvel Nakundi, Harold St-Louis; Recorded at SYSTEMS TWO RECORDING STUDIO (New York) by Joe Marciano; Mixed by Goh Hotoda (Atami, Japon); Mastered by Felipe Tichauer (Miami)
2006	Let's Do this	Jowee Juise Inc.	Jowee Omicil (clarinet, sax alto, sax soprano, vocals), Darren Barrett (trumpet); Chris Pottinger (electric bass); John Gibson (organ, Rhodes, piano); Charles Haynes (drums and programming); Warren Wolfe (electronic MalletKat vibes) Guest: Harold Faustin (guitar); Eric Asswab (guitar); Skip Dorsey (guitar); recorded at STUDIO VICTOR INC (Montreal)

=== Soundtrack ===
- 2013: Ayiti Toma, The Land of The Living, documentary by Joseph Hillel
- 2020: THE EDDY Netflix Show Joanna Kulig (vocals), Jorja Smith (Vocals), Sopico (Vocals), Jowee Omicil (saxophones), Randy Kerber (piano), Damian Nueva (bass), Ludovic Louis (Trumpets), Lada Obradovic (drums)

=== Collaborations ===
Year	Artist	Album/Title	Label	Featured personnel
2026	Saul Williams	The Dagger	Fader Label	Saul Williams, Jimetta Rose, Jowee Omicil
2023	MYOR & OUDEN	FunKey ToniTe	BasH! Village Records	Myor (vocals); Jowee Omicil (saxophone, vocals); Ouden (programming)
2023	MYOR & OUDEN	Don'T Go FasT	BasH! Village Records	Myor (vocals); Jowee Omicil (saxophone, vocals); Ouden (Programming)
2022	Jowee Omicil	SiT-iN	BasH! Village Records	Randy Kerber (Métallophone, Rhodes); Jonathan Jurion (Piano); Delphine Langhoff (Drums); Yoann Danier (Drums); Jendah Manga (Elec, Bass); jowee Omicil (alto-sax, vocals)
2021	Anne Sila	A Nos Cœurs/Interlude C’est Quoi; Interlude Track Of Time	PlayTwo	Anne Sila (vocals); Jowee Omicil (saxophone); Jendah Manga (Electric bass); Arnaud Dolmen (drums); Mario Canonge (piano)
2021	Napoleon Maddox & Sorg	L’ouverture de Toussaint	TBD	Napoleon Maddox (Vocals); Sorg (producer) Jowee Omicil (alto & soprano saxophone, vocals)
2021	Ludovic Louis	Rebirth/ Everybody	Ludo Louis Productions	Ludovic Louis (Trumpet, Vocals); Jowee Omicil (Hype vocals);
2021	Kandy Guira	Nagtaba/ Africa	KDBES	Kandy Guira (Vocals); Jowee Omicil (saxophone)
2021	Anissa Altmayer	#1/Le Chemin	Octava Bassa	Anissa Altmayer (Vocals, cello); Jowee Omicil (soprano saxophone)
2020	Sopico	Épisode 0/ Thème	Universal Music	Sopico (Vocals); Jowee Omicil (soprano saxophone)
2020	Ibrahim Maalouf	40 Mélodies/ Sensuality	Mister IBÉ	Ibrahim Maalouf (trumpet); François Delporte (guitarist); Jowee Omicil (saxophone)
2020	Kazy Lambist	Sky Kiss/ OH MY GOD	Cinq 7/ Wagram Music	Kazy Lambist (Vocals); Jowee Omicil (piccolo); Glasses (vocals)
2020	Kazy Lambist	Sky Kiss/ Sky Kiss	Cinq 7/ Wagram Music	Kazy Lambist (Vocals); Jowee Omicil (piccolo); Jean-Benoit Dunckel half of Air (keys and production)
2019	Jonathan Jurion	Le Temps Fou/ Capricorn Moon; Bismillah Rrahmani Rrahim; Once Upon A Time	Komos	Jonathan Jurion (piano); Jowee Omicil (soprano & alto saxophone); Arnaud Dolmen (drums); Michel Alibo (Bass); Josaiah Woodson (trumpet)
2019	GUTS	Philanthropiques/Voyaging Bird; Li Dous Konsa; Bougé Bagay La	Heavenly Sweetness	GUTS; Jowee Omicil (saxophones, vocals and composer)
2019	Kazy Lambist	Single: Tous Les Jours	Cinq 7/ Wagram Music	Kazy Lambist (Vocals); Jowee Omicil (composer and alto sax, soprano sax); Amoué (vocals)
2018	Kazy Lambist	Single: WORK	Cinq 7/ Wagram Music	Kazy Lambist (Vocals); Jowee Omicil (soprano saxophone, vocals); Pongo (vocals)
2011	Francisco Mela & Cuban Safari	Tree of life	Half Note	Francisco Mela (drums, vocals); Elio Villafranca (piano); Leo Genovese (piano); Uri Gurvich (saxophone); Ben Monder (guitar); Luques Curtis (bass); Mauricio Herrera (percussion); Esperanza Spalding (vocals) track 4; Peter Slavov (bass); Arturo Stable (percussion); Jowee Omicil (saxophone)

== Movie ==
- 2024: Mr.Aznavour, as Sammy Davis Junior, Film by Mehdi Idir, Grand Corps Malade
- 2023: Le Temps D'Aimer, Film by Katell Quillévéré
- 2021: Big In Jazz Collective, documentary by Marina Jallier
- 2020: The Eddy, Netflix show, directed by Damien Chazelle, Houda Benyamina, Laïla Marrakchi and Alan Poul
- 2019: This Is The Bash, feature documentary by Mario Tahi Lathan
