= Tales of the City (1993 miniseries) =

Television miniseries directed by Alastair Reid

- DVD cover
- Also known as: Armistead Maupin's Tales of the City
- Genre: Drama
- Based on: Tales of the City by Armistead Maupin
- Screenplay by: Richard Kramer
- Directed by: Alastair Reid
- Starring: Olympia Dukakis; Donald Moffat; Chloe Webb; Laura Linney; William Campbell; Paul Gross; Marcus D'Amico; Thomas Gibson; Barbara Garrick; Nina Foch; Stanley DeSantis
- Theme music composer: John Keane
- Countries of origin: United Kingdom; United States
- Original language: English
- No. of episodes: 6

Production
- Producers: Antony Root; Alan Poul
- Cinematography: Walt Lloyd
- Editor: David Gamble
- Running time: 360 min.
- Production companies: Working Title Films; Propaganda Films

Original release
- Network: Channel 4
- Release: 28 September – 2 November 1993

Related
- Tales of the City (2019 miniseries)

Tales of the City (formally Armistead Maupin's Tales of the City) is a 1993 television miniseries based on the first of the Tales of the City series of novels by Armistead Maupin.

To date, the first three books have been adapted into television miniseries; the first, Tales of the City, was produced by the UK's Channel 4 and was first screened in the UK in 1993, then shown on PBS in the US in January 1994. Channel 4 eventually teamed up with the American cable network Showtime to produce the sequel, More Tales of the City, which premiered in the US and UK in 1998. The third installment of the series, Further Tales of the City, was produced by Showtime (without Channel 4) and was originally aired in the US on Showtime in May 2001.

A fourth installment, Armistead Maupin's Tales of the City, premiered on Netflix on 7 June 2019, with Laura Linney, Olympia Dukakis, Barbara Garrick and Paul Gross reprising their roles.

== Premise and release ==
Following the storyline in Maupin's first book, the first miniseries begins in the summer of 1976, following Mary Ann's decision to remain permanently in San Francisco following her vacation there and spans the next several months, concluding on New Year's Day 1977.

The miniseries premiered on Channel 4 in the UK on 28 September 1993, and was screened by PBS in the US in January 1994. Amid the controversy surrounding the homosexual themes, nudity, and illicit drug use in the miniseries, Tales of the City gave PBS its highest ratings ever for a dramatic programme. In deference to local standards, PBS gave stations the option of showing an edited version in which male and female body parts were obscured by pixelation. The original six-part miniseries was produced by Britain's Channel 4 Television Corporation in conjunction with San Francisco's PBS station KQED and PBS' American Playhouse. Despite the ratings success of Tales of the City, PBS bowed to threats of federal funding cuts and announced it would not participate in the television production of the sequel, More Tales of the City.

== Cast and characters ==
Color key
Main cast (Starring in first opening credits order)
Secondary cast ("Featuring" or "with" in opening credits)
Guest cast (Co-starring or closing credits)

Character	Tales of the City	More Tales of the City	Further Tales of the City	Tales of the City
Character	1993	1998	2001	2019
Main cast
Anna Madrigal	Olympia Dukakis	Olympia Dukakis	Olympia Dukakis	Olympia Dukakis
Edgar Halcyon	Donald Moffat			
Mary Ann Singleton	Laura Linney	Laura Linney	Laura Linney	Laura Linney
Michael "Mouse" Tolliver	Marcus D'Amico	Paul Hopkins	Paul Hopkins	Murray Bartlett
Dr. Jon Fielding	William Campbell	William Campbell	William Campbell	
Beauchamp Day	Thomas Gibson	Thomas Gibson		
Brian Hawkins	Paul Gross	Whip Hubley	Whip Hubley	Paul Gross
DeDe Halcyon Day	Barbara Garrick	Barbara Garrick	Barbara Garrick	Barbara Garrick
Mona Ramsey	Chloe Webb	Nina Siemaszko		
Norman Neal Williams	Stanley DeSantis			
Burke Andrew		Colin Ferguson		
Mona "Mother Mucca" Ramsey		Jackie Burroughs	Jackie Burroughs	
Frannie Halcyon	Nina Foch	Diana Leblanc	Diana Leblanc	
D'orothea Wilson	Cynda Williams	Françoise Robertson	Françoise Robertson	
Betty Ramsey		Swoosie Kurtz		
Prue Giroux	Mary Kay Place		Mary Kay Place	
Father Paddy Starr			Bruce McCulloch	
Bambi Kanetaka			Sandra Oh	
Guido			Joel Grey	
Royal Reichenbach			John McMartin	
Emma Ravenel	Uncredited	Jackie Richardson	Jackie Richardson	
Connie Bradshaw	Parker Posey	Parker Posey	Parker Posey	
Cage Tyler			John Robinson	
Luke			Henry Czerny	
Shawna Hawkins				Elliot Page (Note: Credited as Ellen Page)
Ben Marshall				Charlie Barnett
Jake Rodriguez				Garcia
Margot Park				May Hong
Guest cast
Charles Hillary Lord	Paul Bartel			
William Devereaux Hill	Lance Loud			
Richard Evan Hampton	Bob Mackie			
Archibald Anson Gidde	Ian McKellen			
Binky Gruen	Meagen Fay			
Candi Moretti	Stephanie Faracy			
Booter Manigault	McLean Stevenson			
Lionel Wong	Phillip Moon			
Chuck	Lou Liberatore			
Coppola Woman	Janeane Garofolo			
Motherly Waitress	Mother Love			
Father Guido Sarducci	Don Novello			
Mimi Fariña	Herself			
Ruby Miller	Edie Adams			
Bookstore Owner	Rod Steiger			
Karen Black	Herself			
Jack Lederer		Edward Asner		
Helena Parrish		Domini Blythe		
Mildred		Sheila McCarthy		
Birdsong		Gregory Calpakis		
Transplant Man		Peter Colvey		
Bluegrass		Paul Phatisis		
Cop		Vince Sheffield		
Nurse Thelma		Gwen Tolbart		
Willie Omiak			Lea DeLaria	
Ned Lockwood			Ted Whittall	
Claire Duncan				Zosia Mamet
Wrenita Butler				Michelle Buteau
Samuel Garland				Victor Garber

== Episodes ==
No.	Title	Directed by	Written by	Original release date
1	"1.1"	Alastair Reid	Richard Kramer	September 28, 1993
Mary Ann Singleton decides to stay in San Francisco. After a crappy evening at her friend Connie's, she moves into her own place on Barbary lane where she meets landlady Anna Madrigal, and her fellow residents Mona Ramsey and Brian Hawkins. After Mona helps Mary Ann to get a job, she meets Beauchamp Day, her new boss' son-in-law who is unhappily married to Dede Halcyon. Anna begins a relationship with Edgar Halcyon who is dying.
2	"1.2"	Alastair Reid	Richard Kramer	October 5, 1993
Mary Ann Singleton goes on a weekend getaway with Beauchamp who later ignores her at work. Mona is fired after a client meeting not long after Michael "Mouse" moves in with Mona. Michael meets Jon at roller blading. Brian has multiple flings including Connie. Dede learns of Beauchamp's affair and sleeps with the delivery man. After a conversation with her parents, Mary Ann decides to stay in town.
3	"1.3"	Alastair Reid	Richard Kramer	October 12, 1993
Mary Ann joins a help hotline after speaking with Mona. Dede approaches her about her husband before returning home to her unhappy marriage. Mary Ann meets the newest resident, Norman, who lives on the roof. Mona and Anna got out together on the eve of Mona's 3rd year as a tenant of Barbary Lane. After rude comments about her weight, DeDe goes on a retreat to lose weight. Michael joins Jon at a dinner with pretentious gays. As Edgar continues his affair, his wife is left alone with their maid. D'orothea calls up Mona. When DeDe returns, Beauchamp becomes more attentive to her. After competing in an underwear dance contest, Mouse loses Jon.
4	"1.4"	Alastair Reid	Richard Kramer	October 19, 1993
Michael is surprised to learn that his parents are visiting so he hides his sexuality. Mona meets up with her old fling D'orothea who wants her back, causing Mona to decide to move in with D'orothea which upsets Michael. Anna and Edgar continue their affair. Mary Ann grows closer to Brian after her boss at the hotline kills himself. Mary Ann begins to get to know Norman who is spending time with a young girl named Lexi. This includes joining him and Lexi trick-or-treating. DeDe learns she's pregnant at Jon's gynecologist office. While an art exhibit, DeDe is approached by reporter Carson Callas about her pregnancy. Michael learns that Mona never told Anna about moving out, which upsets her.
5	"1.5"	Alastair Reid	Richard Kramer	October 26, 1993
Brian is surprised when he goes home with a woman that he already had been there before with her roommate, who he later learns is her daughter. Michael sends his parents home. Norman goes snooping into Anna Madrigal's past. Mona is upset with D'orothea when she spends all her time on the phone with people in New York. DeDe sleeps with Carson and then returns home to Beauchamp who admits to having no desire for children. Beauchamp approaches Mary Ann, hoping to take her out but she declines as she is still seeing Norman. After his birthday dinner, Norman tries to fill Mary Ann in on the fact he is coming into money. Mona and D'orothea fight over the fact that D'orothea doesn't speak to her parents who live nearby. Michael and Brian get high together before deciding to cruise together. After a crap night with his friends, Jon heads to the bath house where he is picked up by Beauchamp. Halcyon receives a letter about Anna from Norman which he mentions to her as the man was trying to blackmail him. Anna reveals that she is a liar to him.
6	"1.6"	Alastair Reid	Richard Kramer	November 2, 1993
Anna sets up an upcoming party for Christmas Eve by inviting all the residents of Barbary Lane. Mary Ann shares her excitement of Christmas with Michael. Brian learns that the waitress he slept with before now had a new guy. Mona goes looking for D'orothea's parents and learns that D'orothea's father is white before inviting D'or's parents to Christmas Eve dinner. DeDe decides to have the baby, something she reveals to Jon. Jon then dumps Beauchamp at lunch at the same restaurant that Brian works at. Michael fills Mona in on Anna's party but she declines on behalf of her dinner with D'orothea and her parents. Norman continues to try blackmailing Edgar over the news that Anna was transgender. After another strange conversation with Norman, Mary Ann decides to break into the man's place where she learns that he has child porn. Unnerved by the photos in Norman's apartment, Mary Ann goes to an art museum the next day before calling him to meet her. When Norman arrives to help Mary Ann, they go on a walk by a cliff and they argue to which he admits to also being a private investigator before falling off the side of the cliff to his death. When both D'orothea's parents arrive, Mona learns that D'orothea has lied about being black for work. D'orothea and her parents reconcile. At Barbary Lane, the party has begun with Brian having invited Connie. Mona shows up after D'orothea leaves with her parents moments before Mary Ann heads home. She enters Norman's place and burns his Anna Madrigal file without reading it. Mary Ann then heads into the party. At home Edgar is ill in bed when his daughter reveals that she's pregnant to which he asks her to name her daughter Anna. Mona asks to move back in. Days later Mary Ann fills Michael in on Norman's death as Anna goes to Edgar's grave as the man had died.

== Production ==
Premium cable channel HBO acquired the rights to the first two Tales of the City books in 1982 in the hopes of turning them into a weekly sitcom. Pre-production began in the fall of that year with a pilot script by Richard Kramer. Kramer described the script as a "Mary Tyler Moore for the '80s". In the face of the rising AIDS epidemic and a changing social climate in the conservative Reagan era, HBO reportedly felt that the book's celebratory attitude toward homosexuality, casual sex and marijuana usage would not be deemed acceptable by the viewing public. The channel considered toning down the stories and making the series a period piece but ultimately decided to scrap the project.

The rights to the first book were later picked up by the British network Channel 4 and US network PBS, who produced it jointly as a six-part series in 1993. It was first shown in the UK in 1993 and in the US in 1994. However, its airing on PBS was controversial, with political figures criticizing the network for airing an LGBTQ-oriented series. The network backed out of co-producing or airing any follow-up installments.

== Reception ==
In 2005, Entertainment Weekly named Tales of the City one of the ten best miniseries on DVD. Calling Linney the "breakout star," the article called the series "a time capsule that treats its characters with humor, respect, and a sexual frankness (there's some brief nudity) that was uncommon for PBS in 1993 and would be politically impossible there today." In 2025, a study of audience reactions to Tales of the City when it was broadcast in Australia in 1994 argued the series prompted a mediated public debate through letters to a local TV guide, the "Green Guide", reflecting changing public attitudes to the LGBTQ community.

== Awards and nominations ==
Year	Award	Category	Nominee(s)	Result	Ref.
1994	British Academy Television Awards	Best Actress	Olympia Dukakis	Nominated	
1994	British Academy Television Craft Awards	Best Costume Design	Molly Maginnis	Nominated	
1994	National Board of Review Awards	Best Film or Mini-Series Made for Cable TV	Tales of the City	Won	
1994	Peabody Awards	—	KQED (in San Francisco, California) and Propaganda/Working Title Production for Channel 4 Television (in London, UK)	Won	
1994	Primetime Emmy Awards	Outstanding Individual Achievement in Writing in a Miniseries or a Special	Richard Kramer	Nominated	
1994	Primetime Emmy Awards	Outstanding Miniseries	Armistead Maupin, Richard Kramer, Tim Bevan, Sigurjón Sighvatsson, Antony Root, and Alan Poul	Nominated	
1994	Television Critics Association Awards	Outstanding Achievement in Specials	Tales of the City	Nominated	
1995	GLAAD Media Awards	Outstanding Mini-Series	Tales of the City	Won	
2005	Online Film & Television Association Awards	Television Hall of Fame: Productions	Tales of the City	Inducted	

== Sequels ==
Kevin Tierney, a Canadian producer of television films for Showtime with his firm Productions La Fête, later convinced the network to revive production of the series. More Tales and Further Tales were produced in Montreal by Productions La Fête and directed by Pierre Gang, and aired in 1998 and 2001 respectively. Some of the cast of the sequel series remained constant, although other roles were cast or recast with Canadian actors.

Despite the changes in production companies, the same actors played four of the central characters throughout all three miniseries: Laura Linney played Mary Ann Singleton; Olympia Dukakis played the matriarch, Mrs Anna Madrigal; Barbara Garrick played DeDe Halcyon Day; and Billy Campbell (credited as "William Campbell") played Dr Jon Philip Fielding. In addition, Thomas Gibson reprised his Tales role as Beauchamp Day in More Tales and Mary Kay Place, who had a cameo as Prue Giroux in Tales, played that role as a major character in Further Tales. Parker Posey, who played Mary Ann's high school friend Connie Bradshaw in the first series, appears briefly in both the second and third instalments. In More Tales of the City, Paul Hopkins was cast in the role of Mouse, Whip Hubley played Brian, and Nina Siemaszko was Mona. Hopkins and Hubley returned for Further Tales of the City. Armistead Maupin himself made cameo appearances in all three miniseries.

Regarding the recasts of Brian, Mouse and Mona for the sequels, Maupin has said, "Paul Gross was committed to his own TV series, Due South. Chloe Webb had expressed enthusiasm about playing Mona again, but she backed out when the show's producers declined her request to be paid more than the rest of the cast (the show was operating under a 'favored nations agreement' that required leading cast members to be paid equally.) While everyone felt Chloe was important to Tales, she was not more important than Laura Linney, Thomas Gibson, Billy Campbell or Barbara Garrick. Despite the rumors, it is not true that Marcus D'Amico wasn't invited back because of issues surrounding his sexuality. The production team met with Marcus and he expressed 'ambivalence' about returning to the role of Mouse. The director felt it was important to find someone who would enthusiastically embrace the role."

=== More Tales of the City (1998) ===
In More Tales of the City, Mona discovers her true heritage when she winds up in a brothel in Nevada, run by Mother Mucca (Jackie Burroughs); on a cruise to Mexico with a lovelorn Michael, Mary Ann falls in love with Burke, a man without a past; DeDe decides to have her babies, much to Beauchamp's chagrin, and meets D'orothea; and Brian begins a rooftop dalliance with a mysterious woman. Events in Tales of the City, like the disappearance of Norman Neal Williams, are resolved, and Mrs. Madrigal reveals her secret to her tenants.

The miniseries received five 1998 Primetime Emmy Award nominations: Outstanding Miniseries, Outstanding Lead Actress in a Miniseries or Movie for Dukakis, Outstanding Writing for a Miniseries or Movie for Nicholas Wright, Outstanding Art Direction for a Variety, Music Program, or Special and Outstanding Costumes for a Miniseries, Movie or a Special.

=== Further Tales of the City (2001) ===
In Further Tales of the City, Mary Ann has landed a job at a local TV station and finds a story that might make her a reporter; Frannie mourns the apparent loss of her daughter DeDe and grandchildren in the tragedy at Jonestown, until she makes a shocking discovery; Michael dates several men, including a cop, a cowboy, and a movie star; and Prue falls in a love with a mysterious stranger living in a shack in Golden Gate Park. In the miniseries, Mother Mucca visits and introduces Mrs. Madrigal to a handsome, older man, a story line that does not exist in the books but was added for television. There is also a new plot line for Connie Bradshaw which did not feature in the original novel.

Cage Tyler, the movie star with whom Michael has a brief fling, is based on Rock Hudson, who was a friend and lover of Maupin's. In the novel, the character was not named, but was represented by underscores (e.g. ____ ____) wherever his name would have appeared.

The miniseries received a nomination for Outstanding Miniseries at the 2001 Primetime Emmy Awards.

=== Tales of the City (2019) ===
In June 2017, it was announced that Netflix was developing a revival of the series. In April 2018, it was officially announced that Netflix had given the production a series order. The limited series starred Linney, Garrick and Dukakis reprising their roles of Mary Ann Singleton, DeDe Halycon Day and Anna Madrigal, respectively. Armistead Maupin's Tales of the City premiered on Netflix on 7 June 2019.
