= Swingtown =

2008 American drama TV series

- Genre: Drama
- Created by: Mike Kelley
- Starring: Molly Parker; Jack Davenport; Grant Show; Lana Parrilla; Josh Hopkins; Miriam Shor; Shanna Collins
- Composers: Liz Phair; Marc "Doc" Dauer; Evan Frankfort (original score)
- Country of origin: United States
- Original language: English
- No. of seasons: 1
- No. of episodes: 13

Production
- Executive producers: Alan Poul; Carol Barbee; Mike Kelley
- Running time: 60 minutes
- Production companies: Mike Kelley-Alan Poul Productions; CBS Paramount Network Television

Original release
- Network: CBS
- Release: June 5 – September 5, 2008

Swingtown is an American drama television series created by Mike Kelley as a summer replacement series for CBS aired from June 5 to September 5, 2008. The show is a historical relationship drama about the impact of sexual and social liberation in 1970s American suburban households, with story arcs involving open marriages and key parties.

== Overview ==
Swingtown premiered on Thursday June 5, 2008, in the time slot previously occupied by Without a Trace. The show was also picked up by Global in Canada, ITV3 in the United Kingdom, TV3 Ireland in Ireland, Network Ten in Australia, Rai 4 in Italy, Warner Channel in South America, and Universal Channel in Poland, TV 2 in Norway, Channel Four in New Zealand, and Romania.

After seven episodes of declining ratings, CBS moved the show's US airing to Fridays, swapping with Flashpoint, which had outperformed Swingtown despite airing in a less favorable time slot. Swingtown's first season's finale (ultimately the de facto series finale) aired on September 5.

Although the show's cancellation was suspected well in advance, it was made official on January 14, 2009.

== Premise ==
Set in the summer of 1976, the series begins with the relocation of the Miller family to a more affluent neighborhood in the North Shore, a suburban area of Chicago. Bruce Miller (played by Jack Davenport) is a futures trader working his way up in the business, married to Susan (Molly Parker). Susan Miller is a homemaker who got pregnant and married Bruce in high school. The couple have a teenage daughter, Laurie (Shanna Collins), and a young son Bruce Junior, nicknamed B.J. (Aaron Christian Howles).

Tom and Trina Decker (Grant Show and Lana Parrilla) are the Millers' new neighbors. Tom, an airline pilot, met Trina while she was a stewardess. The Deckers quickly befriend the Millers, and the Millers just as quickly learn that their new neighbors have an open marriage. The move strains the Millers' friendship with Roger and Janet Thompson (Josh Hopkins and Miriam Shor), their more conservative neighbors and friends from their old neighborhood. They try to maintain their friendship with the Millers, but the Thompsons are appalled when they learn about the Deckers' marital arrangement. The Thompsons have a son, Rick (Nick Benson).

Although the show mostly focuses on the three couples, their children's stories are followed too, particularly Laurie, who is attracted to her summer school philosophy teacher (Michael Rady). B.J. and Rick's friendship is also tested by the move, and B.J. meets Samantha Saxton (Brittany Robertson), an enigmatic girl who lives next door to him in his new neighborhood.

== Cast ==
=== Main ===
- Jack Davenport as Bruce Miller Sr.
- Molly Parker as Susan Miller
- Lana Parrilla as Trina Decker
- Grant Show as Tom Decker
- Miriam Shor as Janet Thompson
- Josh Hopkins as Roger Thompson
- Shanna Collins as Laurie Miller
- Aaron Christian Howles as Bruce "B.J." Miller Jr.
- Michael Rady as Doug Stephens
- Brittany Robertson as Samantha Saxton

=== Recurring ===
- Nick Benson as Rick Thompson
- Kate Norby as Gail Saxton
- Rachelle Lefevre as Melinda, Bruce's co-worker
- Rick Peters as Tony Mareno
- Kyle Searles as Logan Rhode
- Erin Daniels as Sylvia Davis
- Mark Valley as Brad Davis

== Pre-production ==
Producers Mike Kelley (head writer) and Alan Poul first pitched their idea to HBO, where Poul, who had worked on Six Feet Under, had a development deal. Poul said HBO passed on the opportunity at least in part because it already had Big Love in production and Tell Me You Love Me in development. The two next approached Showtime, but before discussions with that network went anywhere, CBS Entertainment president Nina Tassler found out about the proposal and within a couple of days, had read the script; she gave the series the greenlight in May 2007. The script, written in anticipation of a cable network deal, had to be rewritten for American broadcast television standards, all but eliminating the nudity and the explicit depiction of sexual acts. CBS ordered 13 episodes from CBS Paramount Television.

== Reception ==
The 26 critics included in the show's Metacritic gave it mixed reviews (a "metascore" of 49). Variety said the series "exhibits rare depth" and includes "plenty of nifty touches, from the pop-song score and Boogie Nights fashions to the first-rate cast." The Hollywood Reporter said "even skillful performances by its largely unknown cast aren't able to hide the lack of character development and the sense that the people in this series are almost self-parodies." Salon called it "stylish and '70s-sexy but also shallow enough to feel like a less funny, hollowed-out combination of The Wonder Years and Boogie Nights — which is exactly what the show's creators told the New York Times they were aiming for (without using the words 'less funny' and 'hollowed-out' of course)."

The American Family Association urged members to write letters of complaint to the media, while the Parents Television Council followed a failed boycott attempt with an effort to convince CBS affiliates to preempt the program. Procter & Gamble and Ace Hardware stopped advertising on the serial.

Lindsay Soll writes that one "producer thinks of sophisticated swingers Tom and Trina (Show and Parilla) in a ‘Great Gatsby-like way,’ calling them 'the shining couple across the street.' Exactly why we'd get in bed with them--er, the show."

Audience interest dwindled as the summer progressed. After a strong pilot episode, the ratings for Swingtown got progressively worse, aided by a mid-season move from Thursdays to Friday.

According to executive producer Alan Poul, the first season ending was shot with the show's uncertain future in mind:

The season ends with a cliffhanger, but it's also a completely satisfying ending. So, if we go forward, there are many new things that are set up to explore. And if we don't go forward, there's no feeling that we've been left with something incomplete.

The poor ratings led CBS to see if any cable networks, or perhaps DirecTV, were interested in picking it up. Bravo decided to acquire rights to the existing episodes, but did not order any new ones.

== Episodes ==
Episodes feature songs of the period performed by the original artists; Last.fm, owned by CBS Interactive, features the songs from the show in a sponsored group cross-promoted during each episode.

No.	Title	Directed by	Written by	Original release date	Prod. code	Viewers (millions)
1	"Pilot"	Alan Poul	Mike Kelley	June 5, 2008	101	6.0
Susan and Bruce have moved their family to a more affluent neighborhood in a suburb of Chicago to try to find a different, unique sense of community that they have not felt yet. Little do they know, they have stepped into the world of swingers and the American sexual revolution.
2	"Love Will Find a Way"	Alan Poul	Mike Kelley	June 12, 2008	102	?
Bruce's great day is capped off by going to a party with his wife Susan. Janet begins to understand how great her friendship with Susan can be.
3	"Double Exposure"	Joshua Marston	David Graziano	June 19, 2008	103	?
Susan wants help planning a housewarming party in hopes of fixing her friendship with Janet. Trina has a different idea for the party.
4	"Cabin Fever"	Jamie Babbit	Joy Gregory	June 26, 2008	104	?
The Millers, Deckers and Thompsons all end up at Susan's family cabin where Janet finally loosens up.
5	"Go Your Own Way (Note: The title of the fifth episode ("Go Your Own Way") may be a reference to the 1977 song of the same name by Fleetwood Mac.)"	Bob Balaban	Jessica Mecklenburg	July 3, 2008	105	?
Defying Bruce, Susan attends a free speech fundraiser at the Deckers' home to benefit the legal defense of the star of a controversial film.
6	"Friends with Benefits"	Lesli Linka Glatter	Vanessa Reisen	July 10, 2008	106	?
Tom is jealous when Trina and her high school sweetheart relive fond memories. Meanwhile, Susan attends the Ladies Auxiliary luncheon to help boost Bruce's career, but Janet makes the lasting impression on the elite organization.
7	"Heatwave"	Matt Earl Beesley	Tom Garrigus	July 17, 2008	107	?
Tom throws a pool party without conferring with Trina, who is bitter about his affair with a woman he met in Tokyo; after losing his job, Roger turns to Susan for advice; Bruce and his co-worker, Melinda, get comfortable.
8	"Puzzlerama"	Alan Poul	Adam Giaudrone	July 25, 2008	108	?
Roger and Susan, Bruce and Melinda, and Tom and Janet team up for Trina's annual Puzzlerama party, where the neighborhood's darkest secrets are the clues for the game. Trina purposely teamed Susan and Roger up hoping that they will become a couple and Bruce kisses Melinda.
9	"Swingus Interruptus"	Dan Minahan	Joy Gregory & Jessica Mecklenburg	August 1, 2008	109	N/A
While Tom and Trina close their relationship, Susan and Bruce open a new door with Brad and Sylvia, but are interrupted by Laurie and her new boyfriend Doug.
10	"Running on Empty"	Alex Zakrzewski	Carol Barbee	August 8, 2008	110	N/A
Bruce plans a family trip to the cabin but Laurie has other ideas about keeping her plans with Doug. Roger and Janet start seeing a therapist.
11	"Get Down Tonight"	Jamie Babbit	Lisa Henthorn	August 15, 2008	111	N/A
Bruce and Susan enjoy a night of line dancing with Tom and Trina and Janet starts a temporary job with a local newspaper. She does well on her first few days and her boss is impressed with her work.
12	"Surprise"	Tucker Gates	Tom Garrigus & Vanessa Reisen	August 29, 2008	112	N/A
Susan throws a surprise party for Janet for her birthday. Roger has a job interview for a job in Cincinnati and Samantha finds out that she will be moving in with her cousin Lisa, however, BJ does not take it so well. Also Trina has a surprise for everyone that will change her and Tom's lifestyle.
13	"Take it to the Limit"	Alan Poul	Mike Kelley & David Graziano	September 5, 2008	113	N/A
Trina and Tom have their end-of-summer clambake party at the beach. Roger purports to accept the job and is supposed to be flying out to find a place in the new city for the Thompsons to live. Janet does not want to leave Chicago. Susan and Bruce's relationship with each other could close when Susan finds out about Bruce's affair with Melinda. Laurie goes over to Doug's apartment to leave with him to Guatemala but finds out that he already left. She reads a letter from him declaring his affection and commitment to her on paper. The season finale ended with Trina reading a book about babies (Dr. Benjamin Spock's guide - a gift from Janet), Janet working on her scrapbook and pasting her Dear Janet column. Bruce goes to see Melinda at the bar where they kiss. Susan goes to see Roger at his hotel room.

== Ratings ==
There were low ratings for the first seven episodes — the seven Thursday night episodes averaged 6.7 million viewers and a 2.3 rating in adults 18-49 — led CBS to move Swingtown from Thursdays to Fridays. Following the change, the ratings for the next four episodes averaged just 3.9 million viewers, with an average 1.3 rating in the 18-49 demographic.

== Home media ==
The complete series was released on DVD on December 9, 2008 and recently was re-release on June 18, 2019.

== See also ==
- Plato's Retreat
- Open marriage
- American Swing
- The Lifestyle
