= The Trap (Six Feet Under) =

- Six Feet Under episode
- Episode no.: Season 3 Episode 5
- Directed by: Jeremy Podeswa
- Written by: Bruce Eric Kaplan
- Cinematography by: Alan Caso
- Editing by: Ron Rosen
- Original release date: March 30, 2003
- Running time: 55 minutes

Guest appearances
- Lili Taylor as Lisa Kimmel; Ben Foster as Russell Corwin; Kathy Bates as Bettina; Rainn Wilson as Arthur Martin; Peter Macdissi as Olivier Castro-Staal; Josh Radnor as William Jaffe; Silas Weir Mitchell as Dion Corelli; Matt Winston as Terry

Episode chronology
← Previous "Nobody Sleeps"	Next → "Making Love Work"

"The Trap" is the fifth episode of the third season of the American drama television series Six Feet Under. It is the 31st overall episode of the series and was written by co-executive producer Bruce Eric Kaplan, and directed by Jeremy Podeswa. It originally aired on HBO on March 30, 2003.

The series is set in Los Angeles, and depicts the lives of the Fisher family, who run a funeral home, along with their friends and lovers. It explores the conflicts that arise after the family's patriarch, Nathaniel, dies in a car accident. In the episode, Nate and Lisa discuss their financial problems, while David reconnects with a figure of his past. Meanwhile, Ruth is forced to live in with a new apprentice, while Claire gets closer to Olivier.

According to Nielsen Media Research, the episode was seen by an estimated 4.87 million household viewers and gained a Nielsen household rating of 3.1. The episode received mostly positive reviews from critics, who praised the performances and writing.

== Plot ==
A couple are hiking, while arguing over their journey and destination. Feeling lost, they continue wandering through the area. They stumble upon an abandoned car, which they deduce has stayed in that spot for years. They open the door, and discover a skeleton, later revealed as William Aaron Jaffe, who died back in 1975.

William's family, including his widow, have doubts over how to proceed. They also have questions regarding the circumstances of his accident, as well as any other mystery he might have left behind. Unsatisfied with Claire's help, Federico (Freddy Rodriguez) suggests hiring a live-in apprentice, as they will save money on hiring someone given that the apprentice will use this as credit for mortuary school. They all agree, and Federico hires a man named Arthur (Rainn Wilson), although Ruth (Frances Conroy) has her doubts over having to live with him for some time.

While at a bar with the choir's members, David (Michael C. Hall) is approached by Terry (Matt Winston), a man who claims had a sexual encounter with him a few years ago, which David denies. Keith (Mathew St. Patrick) is not satisfied with his job as a security guard, and gets into an argument with his partner during an assignment. Nate (Peter Krause) and Lisa (Lili Taylor) have a conversation about their financial status. Lisa wants Nate to stop spending much, but Nate is annoyed that Lisa will not seek employment until Maya is in kindergarten. After deciding not to buy a CD, Nate runs into Brenda (Rachel Griffiths), who apologizes for her actions and hopes to make amends. When Nate tells Lisa about the encounter, she gets upset.

Claire (Lauren Ambrose) continues hanging up with Russell (Ben Foster) in class, but Olivier (Peter Macdissi) decides to get more involved in her life. He gets her a job as his assistant, hoping this will expand her ambitions. After having reservations over Arthur staying, Ruth ends up bonding with him after they discuss her rules. At William's funeral, the ghost of William (Josh Radnor) mocks Nate, believing he does not love Lisa. Nate rebuffs it, but he later returns home, dejected.

== Production ==
=== Development ===
The episode was written by co-executive producer Bruce Eric Kaplan, and directed by Jeremy Podeswa. This was Kaplan's fifth writing credit, and Podeswa's third directing credit.

== Reception ==
=== Viewers ===
In its original American broadcast, "The Trap" was seen by an estimated 4.87 million household viewers with a household rating of 3.1. This means that it was seen by 3.1% of the nation's estimated households, and was watched by 3.35 million households. This was a 17% increase in viewership from the previous episode, which was watched by 4.13 million household viewers with a household rating of 2.7.

=== Critical reviews ===
"The Trap" received mostly positive reviews from critics. John Teti of The A.V. Club wrote, "Six Feet Under often takes us inside the perspectives of its characters. It's one of the series' signatures. And while “The Trap” features those moments of explicit character perspective, its themes are also implicitly driven by Nate's perspective — even when the action does not focus on Nate."

TV Tome gave the episode an 8 out of 10 rating and wrote "In any series, the return of a character as integral as Brenda would have been the main emphasis of the episode. Here, on the otherhand, it's mainly a side order as the exploration of how trapped Nate is in his marriage is brought to the fore." Billie Doux of Doux Reviews gave the episode a 3 out of 4 stars and wrote "The usual well-written, well-acted episode." Television Without Pity gave the episode an "A–" grade.

In 2016, Ross Bonaime of Paste ranked it 56th out of all 63 Six Feet Under episodes and wrote, "The marriage between Nate and Lisa was never as idyllic as they liked to pretend it was, but with the return of Brenda in “The Trap,” the anger lurking beneath the surface of their marriage finally comes out. Meanwhile, Arthur Martin starts living at the Fisher home, packing that place to the gills, and Claire becomes an assistant/taxi to Olivier, which proves that her impressionable mind might need to sort out Olivier's “sage” advice a bit more. In an episode all about new relationships blooming, it's the old Brenda and Nate story that remains the most fascinating."
