= Nobody Sleeps =

- Six Feet Under episode
- Episode no.: Season 3 Episode 4
- Directed by: Alan Poul
- Written by: Rick Cleveland; Alan Ball
- Cinematography by: Alan Caso
- Editing by: Michael Ruscio
- Original release date: March 23, 2003
- Running time: 51 minutes

Guest appearances
- Lili Taylor as Lisa Kimmel; Ben Foster as Russell Corwin; Kathy Bates as Bettina; Richard Jenkins as Nathaniel Fisher; Dennis Christopher as Kevin Lamb; Peter Macdissi as Olivier Castro-Staal; Evan Handler as Scott Philip Smith

Episode chronology
← Previous "The Eye Inside"	Next → "The Trap"

"Nobody Sleeps" is the fourth episode of the third season of the American drama television series Six Feet Under. It is the 30th overall episode of the series and was written by supervising producer Rick Cleveland and series creator Alan Ball, and directed by executive producer Alan Poul. It originally aired on HBO on March 23, 2003.

The series is set in Los Angeles, and depicts the lives of the Fisher family, who run a funeral home, along with their friends and lovers. It explores the conflicts that arise after the family's patriarch, Nathaniel, dies in a car accident. In the episode, Ruth's birthday party approaches, just as Nate begins to question the reality of his situation.

According to Nielsen Media Research, the episode was seen by an estimated 4.13 million household viewers and gained a Nielsen household rating of 2.7. The episode received critical acclaim, with critics praising the performances, themes and emotional tone.

== Plot ==
A group of friends watch a film by making jokes about the film, accompanying the bedridden Robert Giffin, a man with dilated cardiomyopathy. As they continue laughing, Robert's boyfriend, Kevin Lamb (Dennis Christopher), is devastated to realize that he has died while holding his hand.

Kevin meets with David (Michael C. Hall) and Nate (Peter Krause) to arrange the funeral, wanting an opera-themed funeral for Robert. Despite the costs, they agree, although Federico (Freddy Rodriguez) expresses concern for the theme. Lisa (Lili Taylor) begins to prepare arrangements for Ruth's birthday, despite Nate (Peter Krause) insisting that Ruth (Frances Conroy) is not interested in celebrating her birthday. Nevertheless, Bettina (Kathy Bates) begins influencing Ruth's decisions, convincing her in letting Lisa prepare a birthday party.

Claire (Lauren Ambrose) misses Ruth's party, as she wants to attend a class by her new professor, Scott Philip Smith (Evan Handler). While encouraging Claire to pursue her ambitions, Olivier (Peter Macdissi) is not convinced that Scott is reliable as a professor for her. Subsequently, they go to a bar, alongside Russell (Ben Foster). Soon, Olivier and Scott get into heavy arguments over their methods, prompting Claire and Russell to leave.

During Ruth's birthday party, Bettina begins interferring with Lisa's plans, and gets them to drink alcohol. During this, Nate begins to hallucinate and see Ruth and Lisa as one person, excusing himself from the party. He has a conversation with Nathaniel (Richard Jenkins), worrying that he might become like him. Inspired by Robert's love for Kevin, David hopes to build a stronger relationship with Keith (Mathew St. Patrick), believing they need to stop fighting. While Keith is still unsure of their future, he is willing to try.

== Production ==
=== Development ===
The episode was written by supervising producer Rick Cleveland and series creator Alan Ball, and directed by executive producer Alan Poul. This was Cleveland's fourth writing credit, Ball's seventh writing credit, and Poul's second directing credit.

== Reception ==
=== Viewers ===
In its original American broadcast, "Nobody Sleeps" was seen by an estimated 4.13 million household viewers with a household rating of 2.7. This means that it was seen by 2.7% of the nation's estimated households, and was watched by 2.84 million households. This was a 7% decrease in viewership from the previous episode, which was watched by 4.41 million household viewers with a household rating of 3.2.

=== Critical reviews ===
"Nobody Sleeps" received critical acclaim. John Teti of The A.V. Club wrote, "This episode is one of my favorite mini-arcs for Lisa, because she rolls with it. Yes, she pouts when the Bettina whirlwind swoops into town, and she self-pityingly washes dishes while the rest of the party is giggling over David and Keith's vacation pictures. But in time, she rolls with it."

TV Tome wrote "This Nate/Lisa thing is getting a little scary. Does Nate have an Oedipus complex? I didn't think he did at the beginning of this episode, but by the end I was a little scared." Billie Doux of Doux Reviews gave the episode a perfect 4 out of 4 stars and wrote "it was nice to see Claire so totally happy. For that matter, it was great seeing Ruth and Keith having so much fun, too." Television Without Pity gave the episode an "A" grade.

In 2016, Ross Bonaime of Paste ranked it 36th out of all 63 Six Feet Under episodes and wrote, "In “Nobody Sleeps,” it's the small acts of kindness that truly matter. Rico finally begins to become more openminded about homosexuality and Olivier's praise for Claire's art validates the work she remains uncertain about. But it's Ruth's joyous birthday party that gives the matriarch of the family a much-deserved great day. To cap it off, Claire offers to take Ruth out to museums and for lunch on the day after her birthday — it's this incredibly simple, yet incredibly sweet gesture, in a very moving conclusion to a surprisingly light episode."

Frances Conroy and Lauren Ambrose submitted the episode to support their nominations for Outstanding Lead Actress in a Drama Series and Outstanding Supporting Actress in a Drama Series, while Alan Poul received a nomination for Outstanding Directing for a Drama Series at the 55th Primetime Emmy Awards. Conroy would lose to Edie Falco for The Sopranos, Ambrose would lose to Tyne Daly for Judging Amy, and Poul would lose to The West Wing for the episode "Twenty Five".
