= Barbara Garrick =

American actress

- Occupation: Actress
- Years active: 1985–present
- Notable work: One Life to Live; Tales of the City

Barbara Garrick is an American actress. Garrick has appeared on stage, television and in film.

== Life and career ==
Garrick appeared in several New York-based television soap operas, including the roles of villainous nurse Charlotte Wheaton on Guiding Light in 1985, and Rita Renfield on As the World Turns in 1999. She originated the role of unstable cult member Allison Perkins on One Life to Live from 1986 to 1987, returning from August 2001 to August 2002, and then making brief appearances in October 2002 and January 2003. Garrick once again returned to the role from January 2008 to March 2008. She reappeared from February to April 2010, and again on January 5, 2012, through the series' the broadcast finale January 13, 2012. Garrick returned for the first-season finale of Prospect Park's streaming reboot of One Life to Live on August 19, 2013.

Garrick's first film role was as Helen Weaver in the 1988 film Eight Men Out, followed by performances in films such as Working Girl (1988), Postcards from the Edge (1990), The Firm (1993), and Sleepless in Seattle (1993).

Garrick played DeDe Halcyon Day in four television miniseries based on Armistead Maupin's Tales of the City novels: Tales of the City (1993), More Tales of the City (1998), Further Tales of the City (2001), and Tales of the City (2019). In 2002, she was nominated for a Gemini Award for Best Performance by an Actress in a Leading Role in a Dramatic Program or Mini-Series for Further Tales of the City.

Garrick also appeared in several episodes of the New York City-based procedural shows Law & Order, Law & Order: Criminal Intent, and Law & Order: Special Victims Unit.

== Filmography ==
=== Film ===
Year	Title	Role	Notes
1988	Eight Men Out	Helen Weaver	
1988	Working Girl	Phyllis Trask	
1990	Days of Thunder	Lauren Daland	
1990	Postcards from the Edge	Carol	
1993	The Firm	Kay Quinn	
1993	Sleepless in Seattle	Victoria	
1995	Miami Rhapsody	Terri	
1996	A Couch in New York	Lizbeth Honeywell	
1997	The Ice Storm	Weather Reporter	
2000	Pollock	Betty Parsons	
2002	Far from Heaven	Doreen	
2005	Brooklyn Lobster	Lynn Miller	
2008	Jumper	Ellen	
2008	The Loss of a Teardrop Diamond	Mrs. Dobyne	
2013	The Devil You Know	Joan Stone	
2013	Blue Jasmine	Hal and Jasmine's Friend	
2014	That Awkward Moment	Chelsea's Mother	
2016	You're Killing Me Susana		
2016	My Father's Prisoners	Lisa	Short

=== Television ===
Year	Title	Role	Notes
1985	Guiding Light	Charlotte Wheaton	TV series
1985	Spenser: For Hire	Cathy Lowington	"Discord in a Minor"
1986	The Campbells	Mrs. Sims	"The Haunting"
1986–1987, 2001–2003, 2008, 2010, 2012–2013	One Life to Live	Allison Perkins	Recurring role
1987	The Equalizer	Deborah Whitten	"Hand and Glove"
1988	Spenser: For Hire	Valentine	"Haunting"
1990	Kojak: It's Always Something	Stacy Wainwright	TV film
1991	The Days and Nights of Molly Dodd	Carolyn	"Here's Why You Shouldn't Talk to Strangers in the Park"
1993	Dottie Gets Spanked	Lorraine Gale	TV short
1993	Tales of the City	DeDe Halcyon Day	TV miniseries
1994	Normandy: The Great Crusade	Karla King (voice)	TV film
1995	Law & Order	Jenny Sandig	"Savages"
1996	Lifestories: Families in Crisis	Zoe Rossi	"Someone Had to Be Benny"
1996	The Outer Limits	Dr. Ellen Kersaw	"Afterlife"
1997	Ellen Foster	Aunt Betsy	TV film
1998	More Tales of the City	DeDe Day	TV miniseries
1998–1999	As the World Turns	Rita Renfield	TV series
2000	Mary and Rhoda	Gallery Curator	TV film
2000	Law & Order	Mrs. Sims	"Trade This"
2000	Sex and the City	Celia	"Attack of the Five Foot Ten Woman"
2001	Amy & Isabelle		TV film
2001	Further Tales of the City	DeDe Day	TV miniseries
2001	Law & Order: Special Victims Unit	Hannah's Mother	"Pixies"
2001	Law & Order: Criminal Intent	Jennifer Barish	"The Good Doctor"
2003	Law & Order: Special Victims Unit	Kelly Wolcott	"Serendipity"
2006	Law & Order: Criminal Intent	Pam Williams	"Cruise to Nowhere"
2019	Tales of the City	DeDe Day	Main cast
