= The Eddy =

French–American musical drama television series

- Genre: Musical drama
- Created by: Jack Thorne
- Starring: André Holland; Joanna Kulig; Leïla Bekhti; Tahar Rahim; Adil Dehbi; Randy Kerber; Ludovic Louis; Damian Cortes; Lada Obradovic; Jowee Omicil; Amandla Stenberg
- Composers: Glen Ballard; Randy Kerber
- Countries of origin: United States; France
- Original languages: French; English
- No. of episodes: 8

Production
- Executive producers: Damien Chazelle; Jack Thorne; Alan Poul; Patrick Spence; Katie Swinden; Glen Ballard
- Running time: 53–69 minutes
- Production companies: Augury; One Shoe Films; Boku Films; Fifty Fathoms; Atlantique Productions; Endeavor Content

Original release
- Network: Netflix
- Release: May 8, 2020

The Eddy is a French-American musical drama television miniseries, set in Paris. The first two episodes are directed by Damien Chazelle and written by Jack Thorne. Its music was scored by Glen Ballard and Randy Kerber. The dialogue is mainly in French and English and partly in Arabic and Polish. It was released on Netflix on May 8, 2020.

The show stars André Holland as Elliot Udo, an American former jazz musician who moved to Paris to run a club, The Eddy, after the death of his son, Fred. Each episode focuses on Elliot and a different member of the band as they struggle to stay afloat following the murder of Farid, Elliot's best friend and business partner.

== Cast ==
=== Main ===
- André Holland as Elliot Udo, the owner of the club, a former pianist and Julie's father.
- Joanna Kulig as Maja, the lead singer of the club's band.
- Leïla Bekhti as Amira, Farid's wife.
- Adil Dehbi as Sim, the bartender of the club.
- Tahar Rahim as Farid, Elliot's business partner.
- Randy Kerber as Randy, the pianist of the band.
- Ludovic Louis as Ludo, the trumpet player of the band.
- Damian Nueva Cortes as Jude, the bass player of the band.
- Lada Obradovic as Katarina, the drummer of the band.
- Jowee Omicil as Jowee, the saxophone player of the band.
- Amandla Stenberg as Julie Udo, Elliot's troubled teenage daughter.

=== Recurring ===
- Benjamin Biolay as Franck Levy
- Léonie Simaga as Commandant Keita
- Melissa George as Alison Jenkins
- Dhafer L'Abidine as Sami Ben Miled
- Vincent Heniene as Martin
- Ouassini Embarek as Paplar, Amira's brother
- Elyes Aguis as Adam, Amira and Farid's son
- Hajar Chafik as Inés, Amira and Farid's daughter
- Louis Moutin as Éric Belmont, a drummer
- Alexis Manenti as Zivko
- Liah O'Prey as Beatrice

=== Guest ===
- Jisca Kalvanda as Habiba
- Narcisse Mame as Omar
- Tchéky Karyo as Daniel Perrin
- Richard Keep as Scott, Alison's husband
- Agnieszka Pilaszewska as Kinga, Maja's mother

== Episodes ==
No.	Title	Directed by	Written by	Original release date
1	"Elliot"	Damien Chazelle	Jack Thorne	May 8, 2020
American pianist Elliot Udo gives up his illustrious career to be the manager of a French jazz band, "The Eddy", as well as the owner of a struggling night club of the same name based in Paris. One night, Elliot is approached by a gang of thugs who threaten him over non-payment of alcohol which Elliot knows nothing about. He rebukes his friend and business partner Farid who manages the financial business of The Eddy. The next day, Elliot's estranged teenage daughter Julie comes to visit. Later that evening, Farid is murdered by a masked assailant outside The Eddy.
2	"Julie"	Damien Chazelle	Jack Thorne	May 8, 2020
At her father's request, Julie enrolls in an international private school. A schism erupts between Elliot and the band while they practice. Meanwhile, Julie truants and runs into Sim, a bartender working at The Eddy, before they spend the day together. When Elliot finds, he argues with Julie over her misbehaviour. That night, Julie is further stressed when Sim refuses her sexual advances, causing her to walk out of The Eddy. When Elliot turns to the police for help finding her he is wrongfully accused of orchestrating Farid's murder and is forced to spend the night in jail.
3	"Amira"	Houda Benyamina	Jack Thorne	May 8, 2020
Amira, Farid's widowed wife, learns that his body is being released and prepares for his funeral which is complicated by the presence of her estranged brother and the stuffiness of Farid's wealthy parents. Maja helps to organize an alternative celebration with Farid's friends that pays tribute to Farid's life. Elliot's identification of the man who mugged him leads him into a confrontation with the same person.
4	"Jude"	Houda Benyamina	Jack Thorne & Rachel De-lahay; Story by : Rebecca Lenkiewicz & Rachel De-lahay	May 8, 2020
Jude, The Eddy's bass player and a recovering drug addict, becomes depressed when Habiba, his former girlfriend, tells him she is about to be married. He offers to be a witness at their courthouse wedding and then spends the day with her and her husband, celebrating their union while struggling to maintain his sobriety. Elliot is in a rush to pay the debt he owes only to end up falling out with Julie. She later moves in with Maja, the lead singer of The Eddy. After slapping a ban on The Eddy, the Parisian police grant permission to Elliot to reopen the club on the condition by local police to have CCTV cameras installed to identify the shark who has been harassing him.
5	"Maja"	Laïla Marrakchi	Jack Thorne	May 8, 2020
Maja receives a lucrative offer to sing backup vocals on a two month European tour for a well known French star. She struggles with the decision to either leave the band and finally make a clean break from Elliot or stay in order to stay true to her artistic principles. In the meantime, Elliot finally persuades a music producer to sign the band, but learns that he must partially fund their record in order to have the backing of the label. Elliot discovers the band's drummer, Katarina, introduced Farid to the drug dealers that would eventually kill him, causing Elliot to fire her.
6	"Sim"	Laïla Marrakchi	Jack Thorne & Hamid Hlioua; Story by : Hamid Hlioua	May 8, 2020
Sim tries desperately to raise enough funds to send his sick grandmother to Mecca and Julie tries to help him. Meanwhile, Eliot finally comes clean to Amira about the missing money that was behind Farid's death, causing her to urge him to confess all to the police.
7	"Katarina"	Alan Poul	Jack Thorne & Phillip Howze; Story by : Jack Thorne & Rebecca Lenkiewicz	May 8, 2020
After Elliot finds Zivko, the man who was threatening him, dead outside his club he is introduced to Zivko's boss, Sami, a jazz fan who makes an interesting business offer to Elliot. Katarina struggles to provide healthcare for her ailing father. After witnessing Elliot getting into a car with Sami's men, she makes an attempt to set things right with Sami in order to protect Elliot. Meanwhile the band starts recording their album.
8	"The Eddy"	Alan Poul	Jack Thorne	May 8, 2020
Amira receives a suspicious warning from her brother about Sami and the club. She goes to visit her brother at their childhood home to try to get more information out of him. Elliot prepares for a special one night live recording of one of his songs for the album. Elliot's ex-wife Allison comes to Paris and reveals she wants Julie to return home with her. Elliot schemes with Amira and the police to catch Sami who, besides being a jazz lover, is the leader of a gang. Elliot accepts Sami's business offer to buy into the club as a silent partner with the condition that Amira's brother is their go-between contact, setting the brother as a spy and setting up Sami's downfall.

== Production ==
In September 2017, Netflix announced it had ordered eight episodes of the series, with Jack Thorne as principal writer. Damien Chazelle was to direct the first two episodes, and Glen Ballard and Randy Kerber would compose the series's original music. The episodes would include dialog in English, French and Arabic. In November 2018, it was announced Atlantique Productions would produce the series. In February 2019, Tahar Rahim joined the cast and Houda Benyamina was linked to the show as a director. In April 2019, André Holland and Joanna Kulig joined the cast; and in May, Amandla Stenberg joined the cast. In September 2019, Melissa George was cast in a recurring role.

== Release ==
The Eddy was released on Netflix on May 8, 2020.

== Reception ==
On Rotten Tomatoes, the miniseries holds an approval rating of 67% based on 61 reviews, with an average rating of 6.93/10. The website's critical consensus reads, "Viewers willing to slow down the tempo and groove with The Eddy's moody atmosphere will find much to enjoy, even when the plot hits familiar beats." On Metacritic, it has a weighted average score of 65 out of 100 based on 21 reviews, indicating "generally favorable reviews".
