= Tales of the City (2019 miniseries) =

American LGBT drama television miniseries

- Also known as: Armistead Maupin's Tales of the City
- Genre: Drama
- Based on: Tales of the City by Armistead Maupin
- Developed by: Lauren Morelli
- Starring: Laura Linney; Elliot Page (Note: Initially credited as Ellen Page); Paul Gross; Murray Bartlett; Charlie Barnett; Garcia; May Hong; Olympia Dukakis; Barbara Garrick
- Composer: Jay Wadley
- Country of origin: United States
- Original language: English
- No. of episodes: 10

Production
- Executive producers: Lauren Morelli; Alan Poul; Andrew Stearn; Laura Linney; Armistead Maupin; Tim Bevan; Eric Fellner; Liza Chasin
- Producer: Gail Barringer
- Cinematography: Federico Cesca
- Editors: Andy Keir; Allyson C. Johnson; Aaron Kuhn
- Camera setup: Multi-camera
- Running time: 46–60 minutes
- Production companies: Sweatpants Productions; Working Title Television; Universal Television; NBCUniversal International Studios

Original release
- Network: Netflix
- Release: June 7, 2019

Related
- Tales of the City (1993)

Tales of the City, also known as Armistead Maupin's Tales of the City, is an American drama television miniseries that premiered June 7, 2019, on Netflix, based on the Tales of the City novels by Armistead Maupin. Laura Linney, Paul Gross, Olympia Dukakis, and Barbara Garrick reprise their roles from previous television adaptations of Maupin's books: the original Tales of the City in 1993, and the sequels More Tales of the City (1998) and Further Tales of the City (2001). The series was Dukakis's final television role before her death.

The show won the GLAAD Media Award for Outstanding Limited Series at the 31st GLAAD Media Awards, the third time the series has won the award following the original Tales of the City at the 1995 awards ceremony and sequel More Tales of the City at the 1999 ceremony.

== Premise ==
Mary Ann Singleton returns to 28 Barbary Lane in San Francisco after a 23-year absence for the 90th birthday of her former landlady, Anna Madrigal. Mary Ann is happily reunited with Michael Tolliver and Anna, but things are more complicated with her ex-husband, Brian Hawkins, and Shawna, the daughter she left behind to pursue a broadcasting career. Shawna follows a mysterious attraction to a new girl in town who is making a documentary about 28 Barbary Lane. The relationship between transgender man Jake Rodriguez and his lesbian girlfriend Margot Park faces challenges as Jake explores his newfound attraction to men. Michael struggles with the option to stop using condoms now that he is in a relationship with Ben Marshall, who is on PrEP. Anna begins receiving mysterious letters threatening to expose a secret from her past.

== Cast and characters ==
=== Main ===
- Laura Linney as Mary Ann Singleton, Shawna's estranged adoptive mother who returns to San Francisco after leaving over 20 years prior
- Elliot Page as Shawna Hawkins, Mary Ann and Brian's adopted daughter
- Paul Gross as Brian Hawkins, Mary Ann's ex-husband and Shawna's adoptive father
- Murray Bartlett as Michael "Mouse" Tolliver, Mary Ann's best friend from 28 Barbary Lane
- Charlie Barnett as Ben Marshall, Michael's younger boyfriend
- Garcia as Jake Rodriguez, a transgender man who is Anna's caregiver at 28 Barbary Lane
- May Hong as Margot Park, Jake's girlfriend
- Olympia Dukakis as Anna Madrigal, a 90-year-old transgender woman and the owner of 28 Barbary Lane
- Barbara Garrick as DeDe Halcyon Day, a socialite, Mary Ann's friend, and Margot's love interest

=== Recurring ===
- Ashley Park as Jennifer / Ani, an Instagram influencer alongside her twin brother, Raven
- Christopher Larkin as Jonathan / Raven, Ani's twin brother
- Zosia Mamet as Claire Duncan, a documentarian and Shawna's love interest
- Michael Park as Robert Watson, Mary Ann's husband who is divorcing her
- Caldwell Tidicue as Ida Best, manager of the Body Politic burlesque bar
- Dickie Hearts as Mateo, DeDe's deaf butler
- Michelle Buteau as Wrenita Butler, Brian's neighbor and friend
- Victor Garber as Sam Garland, a man from Rainbow Readers who reads books to Anna
- Benjamin Thys as Eli, a man who begins a polyamorous sexual relationship with Shawna and his wife
- Samantha Soule as Inka, Eli's polyamorous wife
- Juan Castano as Flaco Ramirez, Ben's co-worker and Jake's love interest
- Matthew Risch as Harrison, Michael's ex-boyfriend
- Jen Richards as young Anna Madrigal
- Daniela Vega as Ysela, a transgender woman and Anna's first friend when she moved to San Francisco

=== Guest ===
- Malcolm Gets as Stan, a friend of Harrison
- Dan Butler as Dan, a friend of Harrison. Butler previously portrayed the character Edward Bass Matheson in More Tales of the City.
- Stephen Spinella as Chris, a friend of Harrison
- Bryan Batt as Chris Bauer, a friend of Harrison
- John Glover as Bill Schwartz, a retired SFPD officer and resident of the Flamingo Arms
- Luke Kirby as Tommy, an SFPD officer who is Young Anna's boyfriend
- Molly Ringwald as Mrs. Duncan, Claire's mother and an art collector
- Katya Zamolodchikova as wedding officiant
- Mary Louise Wilson as Doris, a resident of a retirement community that Anna visits

== Episodes ==
No.	Title	Directed by	Written by	Original release date
1	"Coming Home"	Alan Poul	Teleplay by : Lauren Morelli; Story by : Lauren Morelli and Michael Cunningham	June 7, 2019
Anna Madrigal's 90th birthday celebration at 28 Barbary Lane brings Mary Ann Singleton back to San Francisco after a 23-year absence. Though Mary Ann is happily reunited with Michael Tolliver, her former roommate, and Anna, her former landlady, things are awkward between Mary Ann and her ex-husband, Brian Hawkins, and Shawna, the daughter she left behind to pursue a career in broadcasting. Michael is happy in a relationship with a younger man, Ben Marshall. Shawna has a one-night-stand with documentarian Claire Duncan, and transgender man Jake Rodriguez is confused about his newfound attraction to men. Mary Ann is shocked to learn that Shawna has never been told that she and Brian are not her biological parents. Anna receives a mysterious note.
2	"She Messy"	Alan Poul	Marcus Gardley	June 7, 2019
Mary Ann decides to stay in town a little longer to tell Shawna the truth, but Michael argues that she should not do it. Jake confesses to his girlfriend, Margot Park, that he is attracted to men. Sam Garland visits Anna to read to her. Mary Ann visits her old friend, socialite DeDe Halcyon Day, who is supportive of Mary Ann's past choice to pursue a career and of her current plan to tell Shawna the truth. Michael enlists Shawna to help him compete in a bar trivia night with Ben. The Barbary Lane team wins, and Shawna goes home with Eli and Inka, a married couple from the opposing team. Brian's friend Wren pushes him to go out on a date with someone to finally move on from Mary Ann. Jake has a date with Flaco Ramirez. Mary Ann appears on Shawna's doorstep with a gift: a vinyl record of Peter Pan, Shawna's favorite as a child.
3	"Happy, Now?"	Silas Howard	Hansol Jung	June 7, 2019
Mary Ann receives divorce papers from her husband, Robert. Jake takes Margot to his sister Linda's gender reveal party. Claire teaches Shawna some things about San Francisco's gay history. Another mysterious note to Anna is followed by a phone call threatening to expose her secret unless she signs over 28 Barbary Lane. Michael struggles with the option to stop using condoms since Ben is on PrEP. Brian and Wren have sex, as do Jake and Flaco. Margot breaks up with Jake. Michael's ex-boyfriend Harrison reappears. Anna announces to Mary Ann, Brian, and the residents that she is selling the building.
4	"The Price of Oil"	Silas Howard	Andy Parker	June 7, 2019
Mary Ann tries to rally the residents of 28 Barbary Lane to try to stop the sale, but everyone else, though unhappy, wants to honor Anna's wishes. Ben learns from Shawna that Harrison broke up with Michael because Michael is HIV positive. Harrison, who is now positive himself, apologizes to Michael for treating him that way in the past. Margot bonds with DeDe. The ice between Shawna and Mary Ann begins to thaw. Harrison's dinner party sours when Ben objects to the transphobic conversation, and Ben and Michael fight. Michael breaks down over his experiences during the 1980s AIDS crisis. Realizing they both think something unusual is behind Anna's decision, Mary Ann and Shawna join forces to investigate, starting with Anna's new friend, Sam.
5	"Not Today, Satan"	Stacie Passon	Thomas Page McBee	June 7, 2019
Anna explodes when the residents have a yard sale without her permission. When she goes off with Sam, Mary Ann and Shawna follow. Anna tours an LGBTQ geriatric home, and though Shawna gives up the investigation, Mary Ann persists. Jake moves back in with his parents. Michael goes apartment hunting. Brian and Wren's fledgling relationship falls apart. Shawna and Claire bond over their disappointing mothers. Jake helps Linda deliver her baby. Anna asks Sam to take her to the police station, but before she can report her blackmailer, she feels ill and leaves. Mary Ann learns that Sam's last three clients died, and left him money. Mary Ann, Shawn, and Brian rush to the hospital where Anna is.
6	"A Touch O' Butch"	Stacie Passon	Patricia Resnick	June 7, 2019
Anna is back at home after her panic attack, and Sam has been proven harmless. Ani and Raven convince DeDe to let them stay in her guest house and document her life on social media. Mary Ann and Brian reconnect at a family dinner at Anna's. Shawna feels that Claire is avoiding her. Mary Ann apologizes to Brian for leaving him and Shawna, and he voices his guilt for lying to Shawna all these years. Mary Ann and Brian kiss, and later have sex. Ben and Michael discuss having a threesome. Mary Ann signs her divorce papers. Claire breaks things off with Shawna to focus on her documentary. Anna goes to the burlesque bar where Shawna works. Shawna stumbles upon her birth certificate, which names Connie Bradshaw as her mother.
7	"Next Level Sh*t"	Patricia Cardoso	Jen Silverman	June 7, 2019
Having learned the truth about her parentage, a distraught Shawna explodes at Anna for lying to her. Shawna vanishes, and Brian and Mary Ann are frantic. Sam tells Mary Ann about Anna's visit to the police station, and enlists her help to find out what secret is troubling Anna. Shawna visits Connie's brother Buzz Bradshaw on the east coast, and then Mary Ann's husband Robert. Michael and Ben attend a gay wedding at the Russian River, and fight over Michael's suggestion that he rent a room from Harrison. Michael has sex with another man. Jake goes to Flaco's apartment after a bad experience at a bar. After tracking down a man from Anna's past, Mary Ann and Sam go to her and ask for the truth.
8	"Days of Small Surrenders"	Alan Poul	Lauren Morelli	June 7, 2019
In the 1960s, a young Anna arrives in San Francisco. She begins working at a bookstore, and soon meets Ysela, another transgender woman. Anna has a date with a police officer named Tommy, who likes her but initially recoils when he learns she is transgender. Soon he turns up at her door, apologetic and wanting to pursue a relationship, and eventually marry her. Tommy warns Anna that she must distance herself from her friends to make it work, and they move in together. Anna discovers 28 Barbary Lane, and lies to Ysela about Tommy's profession. Ysela confronts Anna when she learns that Tommy is on the police force, which is abusing and systematically killing her friends. Anna confronts Tommy about police extortion against the transgender community, but he is called away because of the Compton's Cafeteria riot. Anna follows to protect her friends, but is arrested with them. Their life together destroyed, Tommy gives Anna all the extortion money he has saved so she can get her gender confirmation surgery, and survive. She reluctantly takes it, and buys 28 Barbary Lane.
9	"Rainbow Warriors"	Sydney Freeland	Andy Parker	June 7, 2019
In the present, Mary Ann, Michael, and Brian are reeling from Anna's secret, and hoping the FBI can find the blackmailer. The residents receive notice that 28 Barbary Lane will be demolished the next day. When Michael recognizes the crew foreman, Mary Ann suspects that Harrison is behind the crime. Michael enlists Ani and Raven to stage a protest as a stall tactic, which attracts a crowd of supporters. Ben follows Harrison. Shawna calls Claire with an apology. Mary Ann, Michael, and Brian try to follow what clues they have to the blackmailer's identity. Sam finds Ysela, and takes Anna to see her. Anna apologizes, and Ysela encourages her to fight. Ben confronts Harrison at Barbary Lane, but learns that he is not responsible. Their investigation leads Mary Ann, Michael, and Brian to Claire.
10	"Three of Cups"	Kyle Patrick Alvarez	Lauren Morelli	June 7, 2019
Anna sits down for an interview with Claire, soon revealing that she has known Claire is the one blackmailing her. Claire berates Anna, and says that the destruction of Barbary Lane will make the perfect ending to her documentary. Anna tells Claire that she still has the chance to make things right, but Claire storms out. Alerted by Michael, Jake and Margot reveal to the crowd that Claire is the guilty party. Mary Ann, Michael, and Brian arrive with Claire's parents, who take her away. Mary Ann finds Shawna's VHS tapes of Mary Ann in the Morning. Shawna heads home to San Francisco. Anna passes away in her sleep. The residents gather to mourn Anna and reminisce. It is revealed that Anna signed over Barbary Lane, not to the blackmailer, but to Ysela. Shawna takes Anna's advice and leaves to see the world and find herself.

== Production ==
=== Development ===
Netflix announced June 28, 2017, the development of a revival of the Tales of the City television miniseries, based on the novels by Armistead Maupin. A subsequent April 23, 2018, announcement included a production order for ten episodes, with the series to be written by Lauren Morelli, who would serve as showrunner and executive producer, alongside an all-LGBTQ writer's room. Other executive producers would include Maupin, Alan Poul, Laura Linney, Andrew Stearn, Liza Chasin, Tim Bevan, and Eric Fellner. Michael Cunningham would serve as consulting producer and Poul was also expected to direct. Production companies involved with the series include Working Title Television and NBCUniversal International. An announcement on April 9, 2019, revealed the series would be released on June 7, 2019.

=== Casting ===
Alongside the initial series development announcement, it was reported that Laura Linney and Olympia Dukakis would reprise their roles as Mary Ann Singleton and Anna Madrigal, respectively. Concurrent with the news of the series order, it was confirmed that Linney, Dukakis, and Barbara Garrick would be reprising their roles, and that Elliot Page would be joining the main cast of the production in a new role.

In October 2018, it was announced that Paul Gross would reprise his role of Brian Hawkins and that Murray Bartlett, Charlie Barnett, Josiah Victoria Garcia, and May Hong had also joined the main cast. Additionally, it was further announced that Jen Richards, Daniela Vega, Michelle Buteau, Ashley Park, Christopher Larkin, Caldwell Tidicue, Matthew Risch, Michael Park, Dickie Hearts, Benjamin Thys, Samantha Soule, Juan Castano, Zosia Mamet, and Victor Garber had been cast in recurring roles. Molly Ringwald later joined the cast in a recurring capacity.

=== Filming ===
Principal photography for the series began by July 2018 in New York City. Filming of interior scenes of the series were shot in New York while exterior scenes were set to be filmed in San Francisco, California. On October 5, 2018, the production was shooting in the Nodine Hill section of Yonkers, New York. Filming took place in the Tenderloin, the Castro, the Mission, Mission Dolores Park, Clarion Alley, Russian Hill, Macondray Lane, and North Beach. On October 24, 2018, filming took place at Mission Dolores Park in San Francisco. By January 2019, filming for the series had reportedly concluded.

== Critical reception ==
On Rotten Tomatoes, the series received an approval of 83%, and a 7.50/10 average rating from 42 reviews. The critics' consensus states, "Like a pleasant visit to a place you used to live, Tales of the City provides ample nostalgic comforts and continues the series' mission of celebrating the diversity of San Francisco on its own terms." Metacritic scored it 63 out of 100 based on 15 critics, signifying "generally favorable reviews".
