= Aaron Christian Howles =

American television actor and singer (born 1993)

- Born: June 3, 1993 (age 33); Houston, Texas, United States
- Other name: Aaron Howles
- Occupations: Actor, singer
- Known for: Swingtown; True Blood; United States of Tara
- Height: 5 ft 8 in (173 cm)
- Awards: Best Child Actor (twice)

Aaron Christian Howles (born June 3, 1993) is an American television actor and singer known for his roles on Swingtown, True Blood and United States of Tara.

Howles began acting at age 11 when he appeared in a community production of Winnie the Pooh. He then performed in a national tour of Oliver!.

== Music ==
Howles is active in a number of music projects.

In June 2010, Howles joined new group Protect the Mona Lisa as guitarist and singer. Aidan Gould synthesized, Tyler Lampman played drums and Stefan Edwards played bass. They are described as an alternative/progressive rock/indie band.

Since the beginning of 2012, he has been a member of Smoking Sons, along with Evan Gamble and Drew Matthews. Their debut album is called PISTOL PINK, which they perform selections from in the Los Angeles area. The band has been described as a rock/thrash band.

Howles stated "The way I see it is, acting is the way I want to be able to pay for the things that I want to do musically. Because music is definitely my passion, and it’s sort of where my heart lies. But acting seems like it will give me a secure future, as long as I keep plugging away at it."

== Filmography ==
Date	Title	Character	Episodes
2016	Bones	McKay Nield	"The Strike in the Chord"
2015	Code Black	Kevin O'Brien	"Pre-Existing Conditions"
2015	Secrets and Lies	Leo	"The Cop"
2015	State of Affairs	Kenneth Travers	"Deadcheck" "The Faithful" "The War At Home" "Cry Havoc"
2012-2014	True Blood	Rocky Cleary	Recurring Seasons 5-6, regular Season 7
2012	Wild Cards: The Web Series	Tai	"The Stream" "What Goes Around, Comes Around and Punches You in the Face" "Patrick. Swayze. Robot. Unicorn." "Panther" "The Audition"
2012	Longmire	Richard Stark	"Unfinished Business"
2012	Meanwhile...	Various	"I'm Hot as a Cookie"
2011	United States of Tara	Noah Kane	"Train Wreck" "Chicken 'n' Corn" "The Electrifying & Magnanimous Return of Beaverlamp" "The Road to Hell Is Paved with Breast Intentions" "Dr. Hatteras' Miracle Elixir" "Wheels" "Crackerjack"
2008	Swingtown	B.J. Miller	13 episodes
