= Miami Rhapsody =

- Theatrical release poster
- Directed by: David Frankel
- Written by: David Frankel
- Produced by: Barry Jossen; David Frankel
- Starring: Antonio Banderas; Gil Bellows; Mia Farrow; Sarah Jessica Parker; Carla Gugino; Paul Mazursky; Kevin Pollak
- Cinematography: Jack Wallner
- Edited by: Steven Weisberg
- Music by: Mark Isham
- Production companies: Hollywood Pictures; Cantaloupe Production
- Distributed by: Buena Vista Pictures Distribution
- Release date: January 27, 1995
- Running time: 95 minutes
- Country: United States
- Language: English
- Budget: $6 million
- Box office: $10 million

Miami Rhapsody is a 1995 American romantic comedy film starring Sarah Jessica Parker, Gil Bellows, Antonio Banderas, Mia Farrow, Paul Mazursky, Kevin Pollak, Barbara Garrick, and Carla Gugino. It was written, co-produced and directed by David Frankel in his feature directorial debut, with music composed by Mark Isham.

== Plot ==
Gwyn Marcus is in her late twenties and has always wanted a marriage like her parents. She has just accepted the proposal of her boyfriend Matt, but she has some misgivings about their future together. Her fear of commitment grows as she learns of the various affairs that her family is having. At first, her sister Leslie gets married. Then, six months later, she starts an affair with her old high-school boyfriend, due to her husband's cheapness, despite making a big salary, and constantly busy schedule with his football career. Her brother Jordan, already married, starts an affair with his business partner's wife, due to the missing passion between him and his wife, after giving birth to their first child. Her mother is growing concerned about Gwyn's being the last single person in the family, despite the fact that she is also having an affair with her mother's (Gwyn's grandmother's) nurse, Antonio, due to the constant arguments between her and her father, including the fact that he also had an affair with an insane travel agent. But the more she thinks about marriage, the more she must search for the balance between career, marriage, and family.

== Cast ==
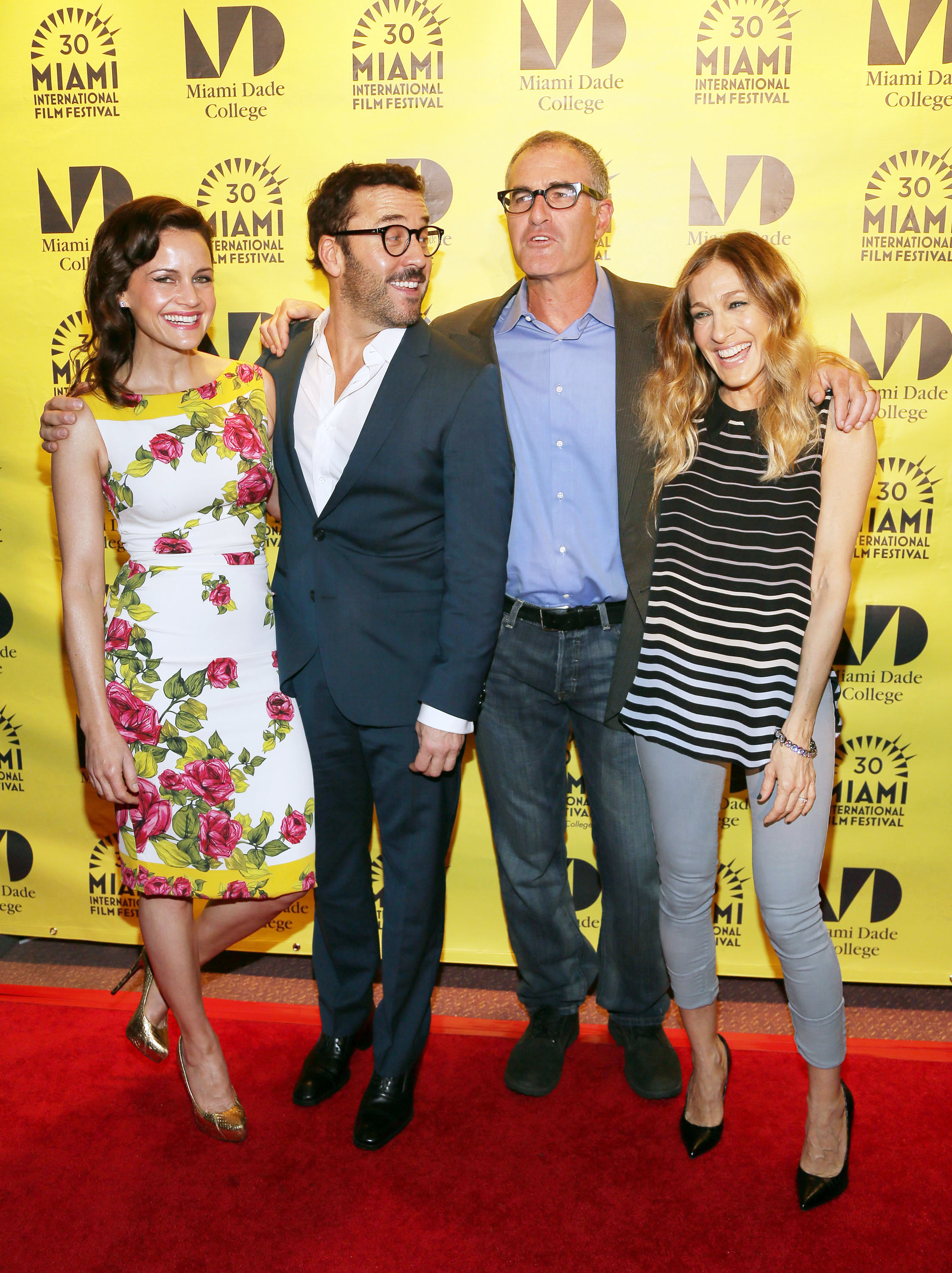
Carla Gugino, Jeremy Piven, David Frankel, and Sarah Jessica Parker at a screening of the film at the 30th Anniversary Celebration of the Miami International Film Festival in 2013

- Sarah Jessica Parker as Gwyn Marcus
- Gil Bellows as Matt
- Antonio Banderas as Antonio
- Mia Farrow as Nina Marcus
- Barbara Garrick as Terri
- Carla Gugino as Leslie Marcus
- Paul Mazursky as Vic Marcus
- Kevin Pollak as Jordan Marcus
- Kelly Bishop as Zelda
- Naomi Campbell as Kaia
- Bo Eason as Jeff
- Jeremy Piven as Mitchell
- Ben Stein as Rabbi
- Donal Logue as Derek

== Reception ==
=== Critical response ===
On Rotten Tomatoes, the film has an approval rating of 47% based on reviews from 19 critics. The website's critics consensus reads: "Miami Rhapsody has a handful of laughs, but wears its influences so heavily that it can't help but suffer by comparison."

Roger Ebert gave it 3 stars out of 4 and wrote: "Miami Rhapsody has been dismissed in some quarters as an imitation Woody Allen movie, but since the imitation and the movie are both so entertaining, I don't see what the problem is."

Owen Gleiberman of Entertainment Weekly gave it an A− and wrote that Parker and Frankel "have created a refreshingly up-to-the-minute heroine, a deeply romantic woman who nevertheless backs off from commitment — not because she's scared, exactly, but because she's earned the bittersweet luxury of refusing to define herself by love."

=== Box office ===
The film grossed $5 million in the United States and Canada and $10 million worldwide.
