= Randy Kerber =

American musician (born 1958)

Randy Kerber (born Randy Michael Kerber; September 25, 1958) is an American pianist, composer, orchestrator, who has had a prolific career in the world of cinema.

Kerber was born in Encino, California. He began his first national tour with Bette Midler in 1977 at the age of 19. He was nominated for an Oscar in 1986, along with Quincy Jones and others, for Best Original Score for the motion picture The Color Purple. He was also nominated for a Grammy for his arrangement of "Over the Rainbow" for Barbra Streisand.

As a studio keyboardist, Kerber has worked on over 800 motion pictures including Titanic, A Beautiful Mind, and the first three films of the Harry Potter franchise. The piano in the opening and closing scenes of Forrest Gump, which features a feather floating in the wind, was played by Kerber and keyboardist Randy Waldman.

Kerber has been an orchestrator on over 50 films, including work with Academy Award winner James Horner. He worked with Eric Clapton as keyboardist, orchestrator, and conductor on the 1991 film Rush, and playing on the Grammy Award-winning song "Tears in Heaven".

During his career, Kerber has worked with a wide range of artists including Michael Jackson, Paul Anka, Leonard Cohen, Rickie Lee Jones, A. R. Rahman, La Mafia, Whitney Houston, Michael Bolton, Rod Stewart, B.B. King, Bill Medley, Annie Lennox, Art Garfunkel, José Feliciano, Anastacia, Celine Dion, Natalie Cole, Al Jarreau, Ray Charles, Neil Diamond, Elisa, Julio Iglesias, Barry Manilow, Don Ellis, Ricky Martin, Bette Midler, Corey Hart, Eric Burdon, Kenny Rogers, Donna Summer, George Benson, Diana Ross, Marta Sanchez, Frank Sinatra, Jean-Yves Thibaudet and Dionne Warwick; and groups including Air Supply, America, Def Leppard, The Temptations, Manhattan Transfer, Lisa Stansfield, and The Three Degrees. Kerber also performed piano solos on Steven Spielberg's Lincoln, Robert Zemeckis' Flight, and Steven Soderbergh's Behind the Candelabra for which he also trained Michael Douglas on the piano. Kerber also worked closely with actors Jason Schwartzman (for his role in the Disney film Saving Mr. Banks), Zoe Saldaña for her turn as Nina Simone in the biopic Nina, and Ryan Gosling for his role of Sebastian in La La Land.

The 2016 Japanese PlayStation 4 role-playing game I am Setsuna features a score performed almost entirely on solo piano by Kerber. In the spring of 2020 Kerber was a featured cast member and co-composer in the Netflix series The Eddy.

On June 12, 2026, he is one of the three orchestrators and conductors in John Williams's score for Disclosure Day, with Williams himself and William Ross. He also was responsible for synth programming and performing synthesizer for the movie.
