= Garcia (actor) =

American actor

- Education: New York University
- Occupation: Actor

Garcia is an American actor, best known for their starring role in the 2019 Netflix miniseries Tales of the City in which Garcia played a recently transitioned trans man exploring a newfound attraction to men. Garcia also served as a production consultant on the series.

== Early life ==
Garcia grew up in Chicago and, after dropping out of community college, they began performing with the local theater company Free Street. Garcia later went back to school, moving to New York City to study at New York University.

== Work ==
Garcia's first credited role was in Netflix's 2019 series Tales of the City, a sequel to the earlier miniseries. They played the role of Jake Rodriguez, a trans man struggling with his new identity, his relationship, and his feelings of attraction towards men. Garcia's performance was well-received, described as "affecting" and with commentators noting with approval that they were one of a number of queer actors cast in queer roles. Garcia also has a recurring role on Party of Five, where they play Matthew, an undocumented trans man.

== Personal life ==
Garcia is transgender and non-binary, and uses they/them pronouns.
