= Alan Poul =

American film producer and television director (born 1954)

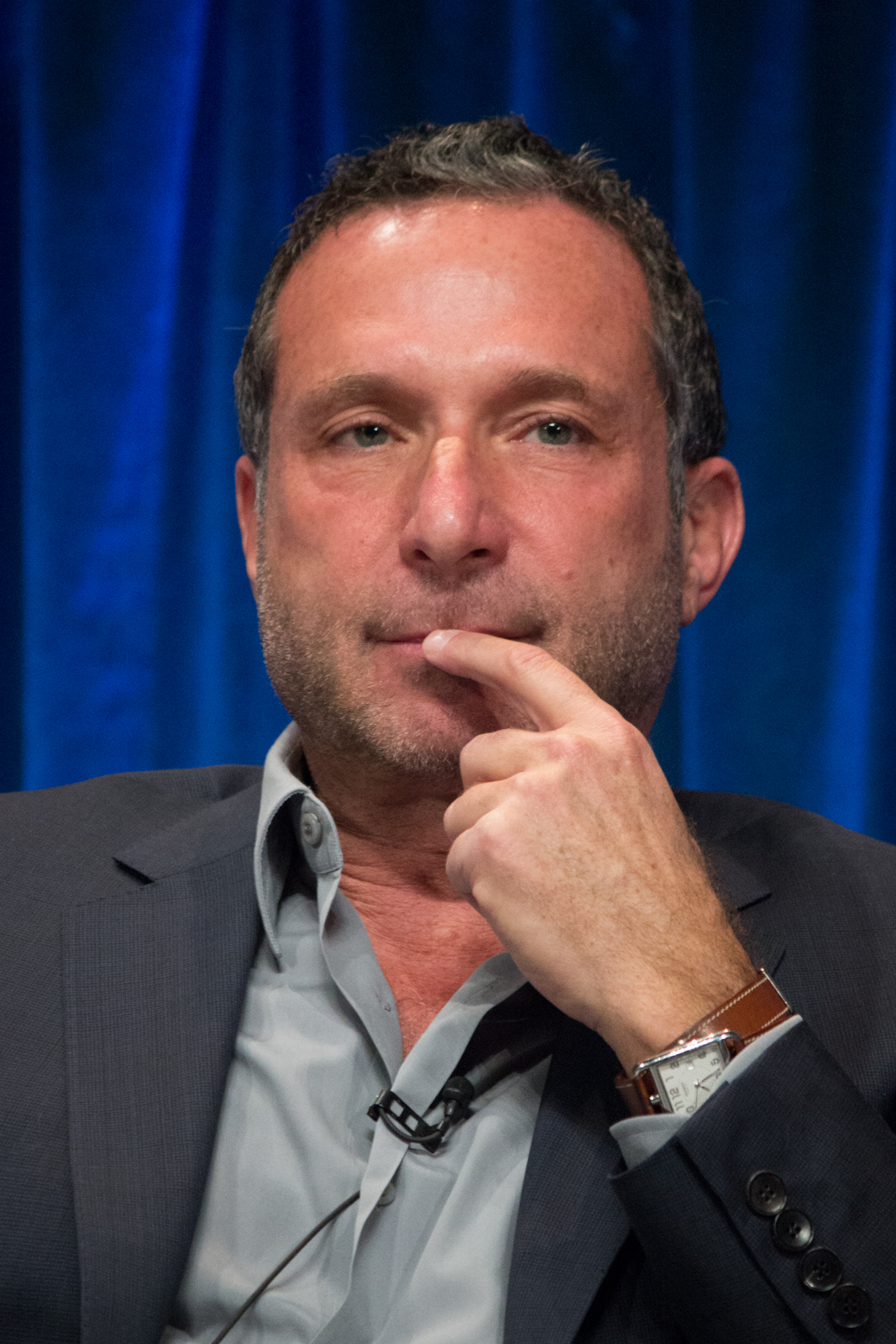
- Born: Alan Mark Poul; May 1, 1954 (age 72); Philadelphia, Pennsylvania, U.S.
- Education: Yale University
- Occupations: Director, producer
- Spouse: Ari Karpel (m. 2017)

Alan Mark Poul (born May 1, 1954) is an American film producer and television director.

== Career ==
Poul served as executive producer for the HBO original series, Six Feet Under, on which he made his directing debut. He directed four episodes of the series from seasons two through five.

He later directed the pilot for CBS' series Swingtown, of which he directed a total of four episodes. He also directed the 2010 CBS Films romantic comedy The Back-Up Plan, originally titled Plan B.

He signed a new deal with HBO in April 2011. He was an executive producer of Aaron Sorkin's The Newsroom. He directed seven episodes of the show, including the series finale.

Poul was an executive producer on Tokyo Vice and directed the final episode of its first season, Yoshino. He is fluent in Japanese.

Poul has been nominated for 7 Primetime Emmys, a Directors Guild of America award, and won a News & Documentary Emmy Award in Outstanding Historical Program for The Pacific Century.

== Credits ==
=== Producer ===
Film

- Mishima: A Life in Four Chapters (1985) (associate producer)
- Light of Day (1987) (associate producer)
- Black Rain (1989) (associate producer)
- Inside Out (1991)
- Inside Out II (1992)
- Candyman (1992)
- Inside Out III (1992)
- Inside Out IV (1992)
- Jenipapo (1995)
- 'Til There Was You (1997)
- Los Locos (1997) (executive producer)
- Thursday (1998)
- Woman on Top (2000)
- The Walker (2007) (associate producer)

Television

- The Pacific Century (1992)
- Tales of the City (1993)
- My So-Called Life (1994–1995)
- More Tales of the City (1998) (executive producer)
- Further Tales of the City (2001) (executive producer)
- Six Feet Under (2001–05)
  - co-executive producer (2001)
  - executive producer (2002–05)
- Swingtown (2008) (executive producer)
- GBC (2012) (executive producer)
- Perception (2012) (executive producer)
- The Newsroom (2012–14) (executive producer)
- Westworld (2016) (consulting producer)
- MotherFatherSon (2019) (executive producer)
- Tales of the City (2019) (executive producer)
- The Eddy (2020) (executive producer)
- Tokyo Vice (2022–24) (executive producer)
- The Savant (2027) (executive producer)
- The Dealer (TBA) (executive producer)

=== Director ===
Film

- The Back-up Plan (2010)

Television

- Six Feet Under (2002–05), 4 episodes:
  - episode 2.10 "The Secret" (2002)
  - episode 3.04 "Nobody Sleeps" (2003)
  - episode 4.05 "That's My Dog" (2004)
  - episode 5.04 "Time Flies" (2005)
- Rome (2005–07), 2 episodes:
  - episode 1.06 "Egeria" (2005)
  - episode 2.03 "These Being the Words of Marcus Tullius Cicero" (2007)
- Big Love (2006–07), 2 episodes:
  - episode 1.11 "Where There's a Will" (2006)
  - episode 2.03 "Reunion" (2007)
- Swingtown (2008), 4 episodes:
  - episode 1.01 "Pilot" (2008)
  - episode 1.02 "Love Will Find a Way" (2008)
  - episode 1.08 "Puzzlerama" (2008)
  - episode 1.13 "Take It To The Limit" (2008)
- The Big C (2010), 2 episodes:
  - episode 1.06 "Taking Lumps" (2010)
  - episode 1.07 "Two for the Road" (2010)
- GBC (2012), 1 episode:
  - episode 1.01 "Pilot" (2012)
- Perception (2012), 1 episode:
  - episode 1.01 "Pilot" (2012)
- The Newsroom (2012–14), 7 episodes:
  - episode 1.04 "I'll Try to Fix You" (2012)
  - episode 1.09 "The Blackout Part II: Mock Debate" (2012)
  - episode 2.01 "First Thing We Do, Let's Kill All the Lawyers" (2013)
  - episode 2.05 "News Night with Will McAvoy" (2013)
  - episode 2.09 "Election Night, Part II" (2013)
  - episode 3.03 "Main Justice" (2014)
  - episode 3.06 "What Kind of Day Has It Been" (2014)
- Grace and Frankie (2018)
  - episode 4.12 "The Rats" (2018)
- Tales of the City (2019), 3 episodes:
  - episode 1 "Coming Home" (2019)
  - episode 2 "She Messy" (2019)
  - episode 8 "Days of Small Surrenders" (2019)
- The Eddy (2020), 2 episodes:
  - episode 7 "Katarina" (2020)
  - Episode 8 "The Eddy" (2020)
- Tokyo Vice (2022–24), 3 episodes:
  - episode 1.08 "Yoshino" (2022)
  - episode 2.01 "Don't Ever F**king Miss" (2024)
  - episode 2.02 "Be My Number One" (2024)

=== Theatre ===
"Vagabond Stars" 1978 (lyricist) Pre-Broadway: Berkshire Theatre Festival. Starring: Lewis Stadlen, Marilyn Sokol, Robert M. Rosen aka Robert Ozn, Paul Kreppel
