= Koati (film) =

2021 film by Rodrigo Perez-Castro

- U.S theatrical release poster
- Directed by: Rodrigo Perez-Castro
- Written by: Ligiah Villalobos; Alan Resnick
- Story by: Anabella Sosa-Dovarganes; Rodrigo Perez-Castro; Ligiah Villalobos
- Produced by: Anabella Sosa-Dovarganes; Melissa Escobar; Jose Nacif; Peter Denomme; María Pagán
- Starring: Sofía Vergara; Rafael Dovarganes; Evaluna Montaner; Eduardo Franco; Joe Manganiello; Michele Lepe; Karol G
- Edited by: Javier Escobar
- Music by: Julio Reyes Copello
- Production companies: Upstairs Animation; Los Hijos de Jack; Latin We; Timeless Films
- Distributed by: Spanglish Movies; Maya Releasing (United States)
- Release date: October 15, 2021 (United States)
- Running time: 92 minutes
- Countries: Mexico; United States
- Languages: English; Spanish
- Box office: $1.7 million

Koati is a 2021 animated adventure comedy film directed by Rodrigo Perez-Castro, in his directorial debut, and produced by Upstairs Animation, Los Hijos de Jack, and Latin We. Executive produced by and starring Sofía Vergara, Koati tells a story of adventure, environmental awareness, and cultural pride.

The film follows the adventures of three unlikely heroes from the fictional rainforest world of Xo: Nachi, a free-spirited teenage coati (voiced by Rafael Dovarganes); Xochi, a beautiful monarch butterfly (voiced by Evaluna Montaner); and Pako, a hyperactive glass frog (voiced by Eduardo Franco). Together, they embark on a mission to stop the nefarious coral snake Zaina (voiced by Sofía Vergara) from destroying their homeland. Along the way, the characters learn lessons about unity, resilience, and the importance of protecting their ecosystem.

It was released in theaters on October 15, 2021. The film was produced simultaneously in both English and Spanish.

== Plot ==
In the fictional rainforest of Xo in South America, a free-spirited teenage coati named Nachi goes on adventures with his only friend, a hyperactive glass frog named Pako. The two of them annoy the jungle animals countless times, including the full-grown jaguar Balam who has taken care of Nachi since he was orphaned. Nachi proves to be too different from the jungle animals, as Balam protects those who look up to him, though he did praise him for saving a beautiful monarch butterfly named Xochi, and tries to teach him to earn others' respect by caring. Amaya, a motherly quetzal, worries for him.

The animals form a council meeting due to recent earthquakes. The wise armadillo shaman named Cocopa predicts destruction and rebirth. As an earthquake begins, the animals run to safety nearby, but a baby ocelot named Mati gets trapped in the rocks. Not wanting to see him gone from the earthquake, Balam takes him to safety, but gets his tail stuck, and several rocks and a tree fall on top of him. They remove the tree and witness as Balam dies from his injuries.

After a funeral honoring Balam, an evil coral snake named Zaina becomes the leader of the animals. Her anaconda henchmen named Jithu and the army of snakes called Snake Squad arrive in Xo. She plans to leave Xo and convince others to follow her to a new land named "Not Xo Land". Furious, Nachi blames Zaina for having caused Balam’s death and tries to persuade the animals not to listen to her, but Zaina tells him to leave Xo and never come back. Nachi refuses to listen Zaina and flees to the temple.

Amaya and Pako find Nachi inside the temple. Amaya tells Nachi the truth about his family of the Tree of Life, but instead, Amaya teach Nachi that Cocopa, who can help to guide him. Cocopa later informs Nachi to look for the Tree of Life and The Mouth That Doesn't Speak.

The next day, Nachi tells Amaya about what Cocopa told him earlier and decides to find a new land, along with Paco. Meanwhile, Zaina orders Jithu to follow and kill them; he and his army of snakes manage to find Nachi and Paco, but the duo escape from them and launch into the jungle.

After the journey is over, they finally find the Tree of Life and encounter a jabiru stork named Calli, who reluctantly agrees to take them to the volcano. They soon encounter Xochi, who tells them to save her family from destruction; they manage to save them, but some of them did not make it. When they try to warn the other animals about the volcano, Zaina claims that Nachi is lying to undermine her authority and banishes him.

Nachi feels guilty for having led them along on a fruitless journey, only to be comforted by Cocopa, who encourages him to find the Mouth That Doesn't Speak. After following an axolotl named Xuxu, he finds the Mouth That Does Not Speak, a carved mouth on a cave which he sees as the right shelter.

With this encouragement, Nachi returns and fights Zaina, who plans to let the weak burn in the lava and preserve forgetting including herself. Nachi and his friends manage to bring the animals into the cave, including Jithu, who turns against Zaina. Amaya gets hurt while risking her life for Nachi, who saves her in return showing the other animals his genuine virtues versus Zaina's vices. However, an enraged Zaina tries attacking Nachi, but instead, Nachi and Pako banish Zaina, who is carried by Calli and falls into a cactus and a harpy eagle.

The animals finally make it to the valley and witness its rebirth. Nachi is credited as the hero, Pako is accepted, Xochi now can fly properly, and Calli joins them. As the animals celebrate their victory, Zaina is seen in the jungle, observing the animals coldly and she will have her revenge.

== Cast ==
- Sofía Vergara as Zaina the Coral Snake
- Rafael Dovarganes as Nachi the Coati and Seth Jr. the Fly
- Evaluna Montaner as Xochi the Monarch Butterfly
- Eduardo Franco as Pako the Glass Frog
- Joe Manganiello as Balam the Black Jaguar
- Michele Lepe as Amaya the Quetzal
- Karol G as Chima the Porcupine
- De la Ghetto as Jithu the Anaconda
- Manolo Gonzalez Vergara as Calli the Jabiru Stork
- Matías Dovarganes as Xuxu the Axolotl
- Peter Baker as Cocopa the Armadillo and Whiskers the Emperor Tamarin
- Jack Rodriguez as Mati the Ocelot Cub and Coco the Caiman
- Antonella Balaguer as Itzel the Arrau Turtle
- Marcelina Balaguer as Camilla the Hummingbird
- Luis Carlos Balaguer as Mario the Tree Rat
- Matteo Markus Bok as Igu the Iguana
- Luca Pimiento as Manu the Northern Tamandua and Juaco the Spider Monkey
- Matthew Windey as Bumbaa the Tortoise
- Regina Carrot as Regi the Northern Tamandua, Manu's mother
- Alexander "Paisa" Ospina as Snake Squad the army of snakes
- Agustina Palma as Vitoriana the Toucan
- Salome Rodríguez as Baby Salome the Sloth
- Susana Hurtado as Lola La Mariposa the Monarch Butterfly
- Claudia Bahamon as Clau the Tapir, Lini's mother
- Lina M. Caceres as Lini the Tapir
- Melissa Escobar as Mela the Sloth, Baby Salome's mother and additional voice
- Mari Carmen Peralta Burelo as Kati the Spider Monkey, Felix, Emi and Juaco's mother and additional voice
- Liliana Moyano as Vale the Ocelot, Mati's mother
- Bianki, Little Vale and Hannah Steinbaum Dubovy as Baby Birds
- Ricardo Tinoco as Felix the Spider Monkey and Hallucinogen Frog #3
- Paloma Pimiento as Emi the Spider Monkey
- Juan Pablo Jaramillo as Igulon the Iguana
- Juana Martínez as Iguanita the Iguana
- Javier Escobar as Toad King and additional voice
- Manuela Gomez as Hallucinogen Frogs #1 and additional voice
- Luis Carlos Balaguer as Hallucinogen Frogs #2
- Anabella Sosa-Dovarganes as Pakita the Glass Frog, Pako's mother
- Wally Rodriguez as Drilo the Caiman and Jose the old Howler Monkey
- Carlos Sosa as Marcos the Howler Monkey and additional voice
- Josefina Sosa as Finita the old Monarch Butterfly and additional voice
- Michelle Vargas, Lenny, Chencha, Miguel Burelo, Miguel De Jesus Burelo, Angel Mario Burelo, Sebastian Burelo, Juan Jose Burelo, Gabriela Ochoa, Judith Noguera, and Luis Carreño as additional voices

== Production ==
Koati is the first animated feature film produced by Upstairs Animation. The production presents a primarily Latin American creative team, with key contributors from various countries in the region, including Venezuela, Colombia, Mexico, El Salvador, and Argentina. Director Rodrigo Perez-Castro, known for his work on Ferdinand and Rio 2, envisioned the film as a homage to Latin America's natural beauty while also rekindling the nostalgic charm of traditional 2D animation.

The animation was created by Toon City Animation, a studio with a long history of collaboration with Disney. According to Perez-Castro, the team drew inspiration from classics like The Little Mermaid and Bambi, aiming to create a visually rich and naturalistic portrayal of the animal kingdom.

Latin singer Marc Anthony was the executive musical producer.

== TV series ==
An animated series based on the film, Koati: The Series, was released on Netflix on November 13, 2025. Sofía Vergara reprises her role as Zaina.
