= Eugenio Derbez =

Mexican actor (born 1961)

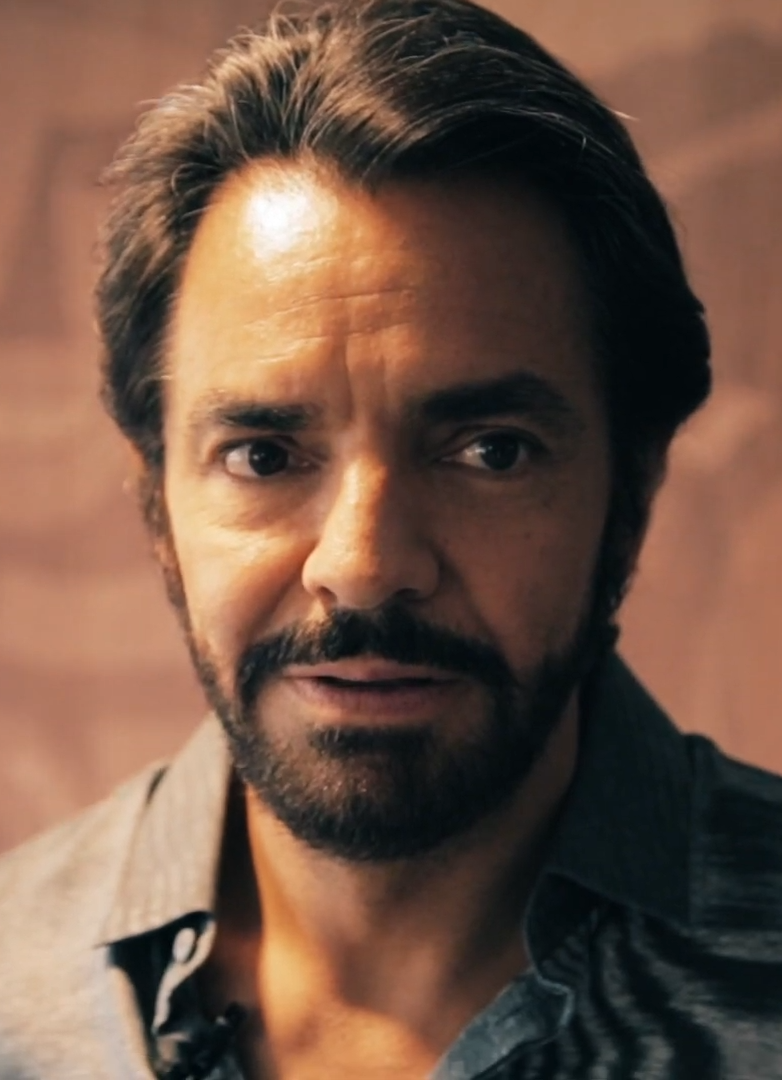
- Derbez in 2019
- Born: Eugenio González Derbez; September 2, 1961 (age 65); Mexico City, Mexico
- Occupations: Actor; comedian; director; producer; screenwriter
- Years active: 1974–present
- Spouses: Gabriela Michel (m. 1986; div. 1987) Alessandra Rosaldo (m. 2012)
- Children: 4, including Aislinn, Vadhir, and José Eduardo Derbez
- Mother: Silvia Derbez

Eugenio González Derbez (Spanish: [ewˈxenjo ðeɾˈβes]; born September 2, 1961) is a Mexican actor and comedian. He has appeared in many films and television series, including The Book of Life, The Angry Birds Movie 2, and CODA.

In the 2010s, he appeared in many American films and television series, such as Jack and Jill, Girl in Progress, Rob!, and Miracles from Heaven. Derbez provided the dubs for many characters in the Latin-American Spanish versions of American films, including Dr. Dolittle, Mulan, 102 Dalmatians, and the Shrek franchise.

== Early life ==
Derbez was born and raised in Mexico City, the son of Eugenio Salas, the founder of the first advertising company in Mexico (named Publicidad Salas), and Silvia Derbez, film and television actress. He expressed interest in acting at an early age, landing his first roles as soap-opera extras at age 12. He made his directing debut in 1997 with a Mexican soap opera named No Tengo Madre.

== Career ==
=== 1980s ===
During the early 1980s, Derbez was a regular in Cachún cachún ra ra!, a Mexican television show. He also participated in En Familia con Chabelo, a children's television show.

In 1988, he got his first recurring television position when he played a number of roles in a comedy show called Anabel.

=== 1990s ===
Derbez kept making movies during the 1990s. In 1992 he began hosting the variety show Al Derecho y al Derbez.

In 1997, Derbez made his directorial debut with the telenovela No Tengo Madre. In 1999, he launched his own comedy sketch show, Derbez en Cuando, which became a hit on Mexican television. The following year, he had appearances in the children's telenovela Carita de ángel and also starred in the youth series Cómplices al Rescate. In 2003, Derbez created and produced the satirical television series XHDRBZ, which blended sketch comedy with parody news segments.

Continuing his success as a producer and actor, Derbez went on to produce several other television shows, including Hospital el Paisa ("Countrymen Hospital"), the popular sitcom Vecinos ("Neighbors"), and in 2009, the comedy series Ellas son... la alegría del hogar. One of his most iconic roles came as the lead character in the sitcom La familia P. Luche, a surreal comedy about a dysfunctional family living in a fictional, absurd world.

Derbez is one of the few Mexican actors to have achieved international acclaim, earning international award recognition as well as starring in commercial American films.

Derbez has appeared in a number of successful and critically acclaimed films including Sangre de mi Sangre, which won the Grand Jury Prize at Sundance in 2007 and his first non-comedy film, the indie smash hit La misma luna (released as Under the Same Moon in English) directed by Patricia Riggen, with Adrián Alonso and Kate del Castillo.

=== 2000s ===
In 2002, Derbez and Florinda Meza co-created a sitcom named XHDRBZ, which marked his debut as a producer. Also in 2002, Derbez co-created, co-directed, and starred in the family sitcom La familia P. Luche, which gained Derbez further recognition amongst the Mexican and Latin community.

=== 2010s ===
In 2011, Derbez appeared as Felipe in Adam Sandler's Jack and Jill with Adam Sandler, Katie Holmes, and Al Pacino; he also starred in Girl In Progress with Eva Mendes, directed by Patricia Riggen. He also starred in the CBS sitcom Rob! and on Broadway in Latinologues at the Helen Hayes Theater.

Derbez starred in Sony's Miracles from Heaven, with Jennifer Garner (also directed by Patricia Riggen), and he voiced the role of Rico in the animated feature Underdogs, directed by Juan J. Campanella.

In 2013, Derbez starred in and directed Instructions Not Included the most successful Spanish-language film in the U.S. and worldwide, which broke numerous box office records, earning over $100 million. The Spanish-language comedy-drama became a surprise $44-million hit in the U.S., and the third-highest-grossing film ($46 million) of the year in Mexico (only Despicable Me and Iron Man sequels did better).

In 2016, Derbez wrapped production on the Lionsgate/Pantelion feature How to Be a Latin Lover in which he starred with Salma Hayek, Rob Lowe, Kristen Bell, Raquel Welch, Rob Riggle, Linda Lavin, and Rob Huebel. It was written by Chris Spain and Jon Zack and directed by Ken Marino. The film, produced by Derbez and his producing partner Ben Odell, was released in the U.S. on April 28, 2017 and May 5, 2017 in Mexico.

=== 2020s ===
Derbez is a partner of 3pas Studios with producer Ben Odell.

In 2021, via 3Pas Studios, he signed a first look deal with Univision, and he and Odell were executive producers on behalf of 3Pas Studios of the 2021 television series Acapulco, which stars Derbez. He appeared in the Academy Award-winning Apple TV+ film CODA, which won him, along with the rest of the cast, the Screen Actors Guild Award for Outstanding Performance by a Cast in a Motion Picture. In 2022 he started as the main character in the movie The Valet as Antonio Flores and will be participating in the movie based in the International best selling book Aristotle and Dante Discover the Secrets of The Universe.

== Public image ==
Eugenio Derbez is one of Mexico's more successful comedic actors and directors. He was recognized by Variety in 2014 as the #1 most influential Latin American male in the world. On March 10, 2016, Derbez unveiled his star on Hollywood's Walk of Fame. The ceremony was attended by thousands of fans.

In 2014, following the success of Instructions Not Included, Derbez partnered with former Pantelion President of Production Benjamin Odell to create 3Pas Studios, his film production company in Los Angeles.

== Personal life ==
Derbez was born in Mexico City to actress Silvia Derbez and publicist Eugenio González Salas. He now resides in Los Angeles with his wife: actress, model, and former Sentidos Opuestos singer Alessandra Rosaldo. He is father to Mexican comedic actress Aislinn Derbez by Gabriela Michel, Mexican actor and singer Vadhir Derbez by Silvana Prince, Mexican actor José Eduardo Derbez by actress Victoria Ruffo, and a daughter with Alessandra Rosaldo. He had a bulldog named Fiona.

== Filmography ==
Key
†	Denotes works that have not yet been released

=== Films ===
Year	Title	Role	Notes
1983	Por un vestido de novia		Film debut
1990	Más vale amada que quemada		
1990	Transplante a la mexicana	Eugenio	
1990	Fotógrafo de modelos		
1991	Hembra o macho		
1993	Soy hombre y que		
1998	Dr. Dolittle	Lucky	Spanish Latin American version, voice
1998	Mulan	Mushu	Spanish Latin American version, voice
2000	102 Dalmatians	Waddlesworth	Spanish Latin American version, voice
2001	Shrek	Donkey	Spanish Latin American version, voice
2001	Dr. Dolittle 2	Lucky	Spanish Latin American version, voice
2003	Zurdo	Forastero	
2004	Shrek 2	Donkey	Spanish Latin American version, voice
2004	Mulan II	Mushu	Spanish Latin American version, voice
2005	Imaginum	Yxxxxx	Voice only
2006	National Lampoon's TV: The Movie	Derbez, Eugenio	
2006	National Lampoon's Pledge This!	José	
2007	Padre nuestro	Anibal	
2007	Shrek the Third	Donkey	Spanish Latin American version, voice
2007	La misma luna	Enrique	Marketed as Under the Same Moon in English
2008	Plaza Sésamo: Los monstruos feos más bellos	Eugenio	
2008	Hellboy II: The Golden Army	Johann Krauss	Spanish Latin American version, voice
2008	Beverly Hills Chihuahua	Store Owner	
2010	No eres tú, soy yo	Javier	
2010	Shrek Forever After	Donkey	Spanish Latin American version, voice
2010	Te presento a Laura	Charlie	
2011	Jack and Jill	Felipe / Felipe's Grandma	Golden Raspberry Award for Worst Screen Combo (shared with the entire cast)
2012	Girl in Progress	Mission Impossible	
2013	Underdogs	Rico	U.S. version, voice
2013	Instructions Not Included	Valentín Bravo	Also producer, writer, director and editor
2014	The Book of Life	Chato	Voice only
2015	El tamaño si importa	El Greñas	
2015	A la mala	Himself	Cameo
2015	Aztec Warrior	Gallo	
2016	Miracles from Heaven	Dr. Nurko	
2016	The Secret Life of Pets	Snowball	Spanish Latin American version, voice
2017	Sandy Wexler	Ramiro Alejandro	
2017	How to Be a Latin Lover	Maximo	
2017	Geostorm	Hernandez	
2018	Overboard	Leonardo Montenegro	
2018	The Grinch	The Grinch	Spanish Latin American version, voice
2018	The Mongolian Conspiracy	Rosendo del Valle	
2018	The Nutcracker and the Four Realms	Hawthorne	
2019	The Secret Life of Pets 2	Snowball	Spanish Latin American version, voice
2019	Dora and the Lost City of Gold	Alejandro Gutierrez	Also executive producer and Spanish Latin American version voice
2019	The Angry Birds Movie 2	Glenn	English and Spanish Latin American version, voice
2019	Dedicada a mi Ex	Seller	Cameo
2021	CODA	Bernardo Villalobos	Screen Actors Guild Award for Outstanding Performance by a Cast in a Motion Picture
2022	The Valet	Antonio	Also producer
2022	Aristotle and Dante Discover the Secrets of the Universe	Jaime Mendoza	Also producer
2023	Radical	Sergio	Also producer
2026	Baton †	TBA	Post-production

=== Television ===
Year	Title	Role	Notes
1981	Cachún cachún ra ra!	Eugenio	Television debut
1987	Tal como somos	Roberto	
1988	Anabel	Various roles	
1987–92	Papá soltero	F. Abasolo / Amigo de Pocholo	"El cumpleaños de Pocholo" (season 1, episode 10); "Entre dos amores" (season 6, episode 37)
1993–95	Al derecho y al Derbez	Various roles	
1995	Lazos de Amor	Himself	
1997	Mujer, Casos de la Vida Real		"¿Dónde está mi hija?" (season 13, episode 43)
1997	No tengo madre	Eligio Augusto Maldonado / Julio Remigio Vasconcelos	
1999	Derbez en cuando	Various roles	
1999	Serafín	El Lonje Moco	
1999	Cuento de Navidad	Nurse	
2000	Carita de ángel	Mil Caras	
2002	Cómplices Al Rescate	Dog Mantequilla	Voice only
2002–2012	La familia P. Luche	Ludovico P. Luche	Lead role
2002–2004	XHDRbZ	Various roles	40 episodes
2005–2006	Vecinos	Himself / El Guía Melitón / Dr. Sierra	"Se acabó el agua" (season 1, episode 4); "Viaje a Canadá: Parte 1" (season 1, episode 39); "Viaje a Canadá: Parte 2" (season 1, episode 40); "Los López en Canadá" (season 1, episode 42)
2006	La fea más bella	Armando Hoyos	
2009	Ellas son, la alegría del hogar	Edmundo Martínez	
2009	Plaza Sésamo	Mesero	1 episode
2009	Hermanos y detectives	Darío	"El profesional; " (season 1, episode 12): "El final" (season 1, episode 13)
2010–12	La jugada	Various characters	
2011	El Gran Show de los Peques	Various roles	
2012	Rob	Héctor	8 episodes
2014	Anger Management	Eugene	"Charlie and the Last Temptation of Eugenio" (Season 2, Episode 51)
2016	Nuestra Belleza Latina 2016	Himself	Celebrity guest (4th gala)
2018-22	LOL: Last One Laughing	Himself	Main role, judge, streaming television
2019	The Loud House	Dr. Arturo Santiago (voice)	2 episodes
2019	Elena of Avalor	Guillermo (voice)	Episode: "Flower of Light"
2019-22	The Casagrandes	Dr. Arturo Santiago (voice)	Recurring role
2019-23	De viaje con los Derbez	Himself	Main role, documentary comedy, streaming television
2021-25	Acapulco	Maximo Gallardo Ramos	Main cast
2024	Y llegaron de noche	Carlos Villarías	Main cast
