= Patricia Riggen =

Mexican film director (born 1970)

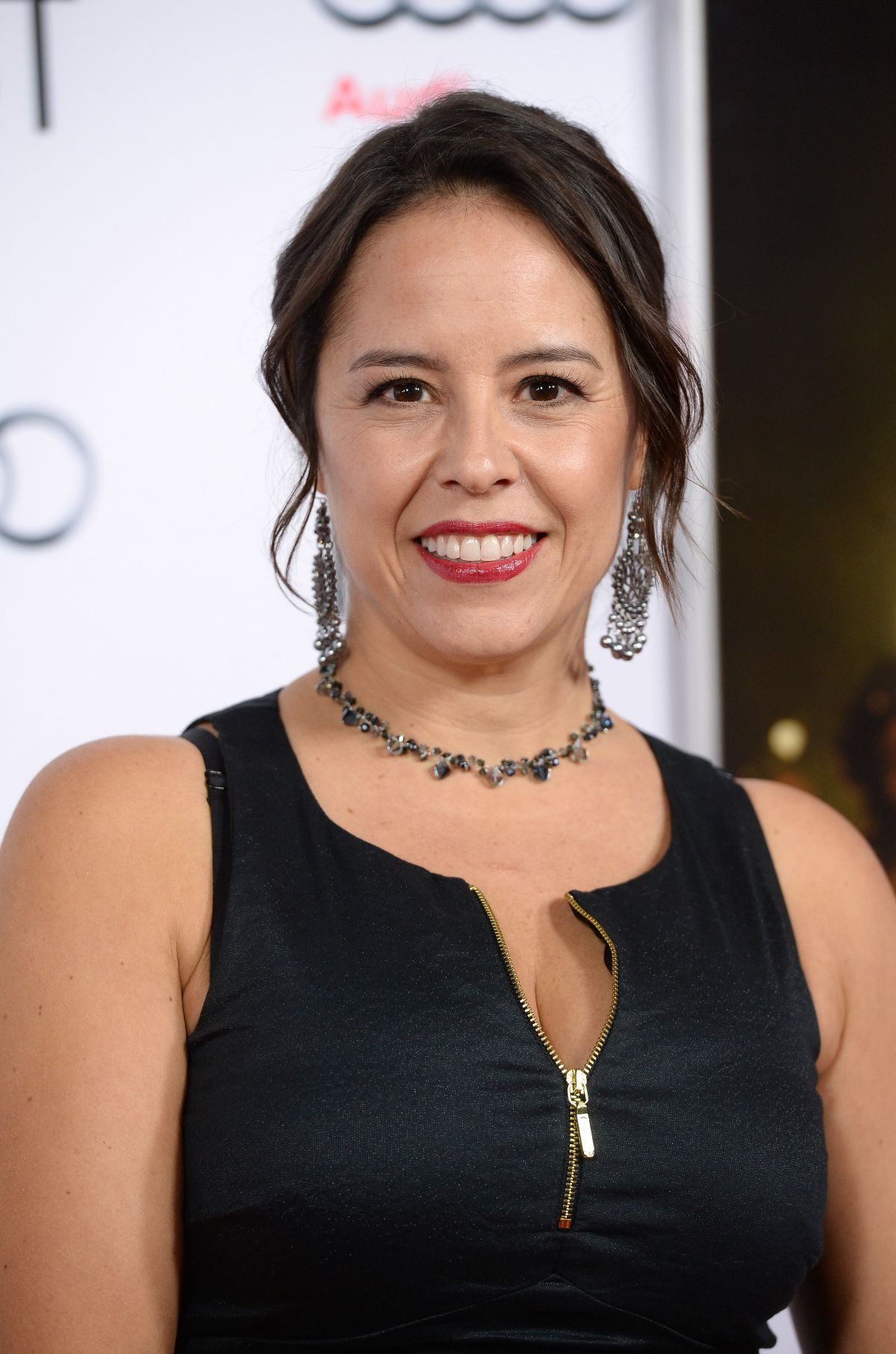
- Riggen at the 2015 AFI Fest
- Born: June 2, 1970 (age 56); Guadalajara, Jalisco, Mexico
- Education: Columbia University
- Years active: 1997–present
- Spouse: Checco Varese
- Children: 1

Patricia Riggen (born June 2, 1970) is a Mexican film director.

She is best known for directing the 2007 film Under the Same Moon, the 2011 Disney Channel original film Lemonade Mouth, and the 2025 Amazon Prime action thriller film G20 starring Viola Davis.

== Early life and career beginnings ==
Riggen was born in Guadalajara, Jalisco. While in her home country, she gained experience in journalism and writing for documentaries. Riggen obtained a degree in Communication Sciences from ITESO (Instituto Tecnológico y de Estudios Superiores de Occidente), Universidad Jesuita de Guadalajara. Her thesis work was titled "Female Directors" and allowed her to interview the four important female film directors in Mexico at the time. Riggen had many jobs up and into her early 20s, she worked as a writer for her local Guadalajara newspaper, worked for producer Bertha Navarro, and collected research on the death industry for a Guillaremeo Del Toro documentary. In the late 90s, while working as Production Vice President of the short films department at the Mexican Film Institute, Riggen realized she wanted to go back to school.

She moved to New York City, where she received her master's degree in directing and screenwriting at Columbia University. Riggen noted, "I had to write and direct all my exercises and English is not my first language, so I started writing all these little movies that had no dialogue". While attending Columbia, she directed two short films The Cornfield (2002) and Family Portrait (2004), a documentary, the former film won a number of film festival awards. Family Portrait went on to win the Sundance Film Festival Jury Prize in Short Filmmaking.

== Directing career ==
In 2007, Under the Same Moon, Riggen's first major film was released, starring Kate del Castillo and America Ferrera. Riggen partnered up with writer and producer Ligiah Villabobos for the creation of the film.

Funding for the binational film Under the Same Moon, which was started in an American studio before Riggen made the decision to direct it independently, was done through both a funding from the Mexican government, and American financers. The film was very well received in 2007 at the Sundance Film Festival. Additionally, the film won the 2008 ALMA Outstanding Spanish Language Motion Picture award, as well as both the 2008 Best Director and Best Film Imagen Foundation Awards.

In 2010, she was hired to direct the 2011 Disney Channel original film Lemonade Mouth. The film received over 7 million views on its premiere night and was well received. Riggen's work on this film was nominated for the Directors Guild of America Awards category of Outstanding Directorial Achievement in Children's Programs.

She followed with Revolución (2010) and Girl in Progress (originally titled Ansiedad) starring Eva Mendes and Patricia Arquette. The film was released in 2012. Riggen believed Girl in Progress, could be a crossover movie that attracted many audiences as a coming of age story with a female lead that just happens to be Latina led, but found out it would be marketed exclusively to a Hispanic audience. She worked with this audience she was given and casting actresses who had their own fanbases, including Espinoza Paz.

Riggen's next film was The 33, a movie based on the 2010 Copiapó mining accident. The movie was first released in Chile in August 2015, coinciding with the five-year anniversary of the mine collapse. It was then released throughout Latin America before going to theaters in the U. S. and the rest of the world in November 2015.

When approached in 2010 to direct The 33, Riggen recounted her satisfaction that a woman would direct a film with such masculine subject matter. The 33 was shot in the Atacama Desert in Chile, as well as two mines in Colombia. Filmed in real salt mines over 35 days for 14-hour days 6 days a week, Riggen's goal was to have the cast and crew understand what being a miner is like.

In 2016 she completed the film Miracles from Heaven with Jennifer Garner, Queen Latifah, and Eugenio Derbez, a Christian contemporary story based on the book of the same title, recounting the illness and miraculous recovery of a young girl in Texas. As the director of Miracles from Heaven, Riggen is the only Latin woman director in 12 years (as of 2016) to have a movie appear in the top 100 annual box office films.

In 2018 Riggen switched to television, directing 3 episodes of the Amazon TV Series Jack Ryan, starring John Krasinski . This action political thriller was based on Tom Clancy's character Jack Ryan, a CIA analyst who specializes in T-FAD (Terror, Finance and Arm Division). Riggen directs Season 1, Episode 3 – "Black 22", Episode 5 – "End of Horror" and Episode 7 – "The Boy". Riggen said that she was able to explore new genres by working on episodic TV. She found that she was very comfortable shooting the aggressive fighting sequences and focusing on a sense of character and performance.

In 2021, Riggen joined Danny Strong on his Hulu mini-series, Dopesick. Dopesick stars Michael Keaton and is based on the book: Dopesick: Dealers, Doctors and the Drug Company that Addicted America by Beth Macy. Riggen directed Season 1 Episode 5 – "The Whistleblower" and Episode 6 – "Hammer the Abusers". The biggest challenge Riggen faced while filming Dopesick was shooting amidst the COVID-19 pandemic. Riggen said it was vital that young people be aware of what is happening and the risks involved with addictive prescription drugs.

== Influences, style and themes ==
Many of Riggen's films center around emotions. In an interview with Filmmaker Magazine in 2005, when Riggen was just beginning her career in directing, she said, "Although I am a young filmmaker and I don't yet know what my style is, if I have to say one thing that I am interested in, it's to take the audience on a journey and make them feel things."

Under The Same Moon is a film that addressed the reality of separation that many families face when immigrating from Mexico to the U.S. The film is told through the eyes of a young boy named Carlitos who crosses the U.S.-Mexico border in search of his mother who is working as a maid in Los Angeles. Within the first few minutes, the film "grabs your heart and squeezes it. The fact that [the film] has been crafted with such a sensitive touch should reassure viewers that, as it approaches its utterly gripping climax, their hearts are in good hands too."

The film Miracles From Heaven, is a story told through the eyes of a child. It is based on the true story of the miraculous healing of a 10-year-old Texan girl. The Los Angeles Times said that, "the film reaches beyond that audience and provides confirmation of the more human miracles that exist in everyday life, if you choose to see them."

The 33 is a drama that follows the true story of the 2010 Chilean mining collapse whereby 33 Chilean miners were trapped underground for 69 days. The Amsterdam News said, "It's a story of ordinary people who reach incredible heights to rescue people trapped at an incredible depth. The well-written screenplay is expertly directed by Patricia Riggen. The 33 will touch your heart without even trying."

== In the media ==
=== Women's activism ===
Riggen publicly encourages women in film to claim their space in the male-dominated film industry. In an interview with Backstage magazine, Riggen is quoted as saying, "We deserve to be there. The time is now to enter all those areas, particularly the directing arena. That benefits everybody. More women in leadership roles create more jobs for women everywhere. And people of color, too. If we have one person of color [in a leadership role], suddenly there are many more who get an opportunity. […] What we need is to stop the exclusion".

Riggen supports the #LatinaEqualPay movement and has posted about her advocacy on her social media platforms sharing, "Latinas shouldn't be penalized because employers fail to recognize and compensate our brilliance, capacity and potential. Being denied $1.1+ Million over the course of our 40-year career doesn't just hurt us. It hurts our families, our economy and our entire country. We #DemandMore"

== Personal life ==
Riggen currently lives in Los Angeles. She is married to cinematographer Checco Varese, with whom she has a daughter. Varese has served as the cinematographer for all of Riggen's directorial films since Under the Same Moon.

== Filmography ==
=== Film ===
| Year | Title | | | | |
| Year | Title | Director | Writer | Producer | Notes |
|---|---|---|---|---|---|
| 1997 | Perfect Target | Second assistant | No | No | |
| 1997 | Adiós mamá | No | No | Executive | Short film |
| 1997 | Pasajera | No | No | Executive | Short film |
| 1997 | Santo golpe | No | No | Executive | Short film |
| 1998 | Sin sostén | No | No | Yes | Short film |
| 1998 | En el espejo del cielo | No | No | Executive | Short film |
| 1998 | Pronto saldremos del problema | No | No | Executive | Short film |
| 2002 | Moctezuma's Revenge | Second assistant | No | No | |
| 2002 | La Milpa | Yes | Yes | Yes | Short film |
| 2004 | Family Portrait | Yes | Yes | Yes | Documentary short film |
| 2007 | Under the Same Moon | Yes | No | Yes | Full-length directorial debut |
| 2010 | Revolución | Yes | No | No | directed the segment "Lindo y querido" |
| 2012 | Girl in Progress | Yes | No | No | |
| 2015 | The 33 | Yes | No | No | |
| 2016 | Miracles from Heaven | Yes | No | No | |
| 2022 | The School for Good and Evil | No | No | Executive | |
| 2025 | G20 | Yes | No | No | |

=== Television ===
| Year | Title | Credited as | | Notes |
| Year | Title | Director | Producer | Notes |
|---|---|---|---|---|
| 2011 | Lemonade Mouth | Yes | No | Television film |
| 2018 | Run for Your Life | Yes | Co-executive | Unsold Syfy pilot |
| 2018 | Jack Ryan | Yes | No | Directed 3 episodes |
| 2019 | Proven Innocent | Yes | No | Directed Pilot episode |
| 2019 | Surveillance | Yes | Executive | Unsold CBS pilot |
| 2021 | Dopesick | Yes | No | Directed 2 episodes |
| 2022 | Alaska Daily | Yes | No | Directed 1 episode |
| 2023 | Saint X | Yes | No | Directed 2 episodes |

== Awards and nominations ==
| Year | Title | Award |
|---|---|---|
| 2002 | La Milpa | OCIC Award - Special Mention at Havana Film Festival |
| 2003 | La Milpa | Gold Medal Student Academy Award |
| 2003 | La Milpa | Best Short Film at the Ariel Awards |
| 2003 | La Milpa | DGA Student Film Award |
| 2003 | La Milpa | Best Short Fiction Film by the Mexican Cinema Journalists |
| 2004 | La Milpa | First Place Winner Dramatic at ATAS Foundation College Television Awards |
| 2005 | Family Portrait | Jury Award for Best Documentary at Aspen Shortsfest |
| 2008 | La Misma Luna | Best Director at Imagen Foundation Awards |
| 2012 | Girl in Progress | Special Achievement Award at the ALMA Awards |
| 2012 | Lemonade Mouth | Nominee for Outstanding Directorial Achievement in Children's Programs |
| 2012 | Girl in Progress | Best Director/ Feature Film at Imagen Foundation Awards |
| 2015 | The 33 | Truly Moving Picture Award at Heartland Film |
| 2016 | The 33 | Nominee for Most Valuable Film of the Year at Cinema for Peace Awards |
| 2016 | The 33 | Best Director at Imagen Foundation Awards |
| 2017 | Miracles from Heaven | MovieGuide Awards - Best Movie for Families |
| 2017 | Miracles from Heaven | Teen Choice Awards - Choice Movie: Drama |
