= 13th ALMA Awards =

2012 US film and television awards ceremony

- Date: September 16, 2012 (taping); September 21, 2012 (airing)
- Site: Pasadena Civic Auditorium, Pasadena, California
- Hosted by: Eva Longoria and George Lopez
- Official website: www.almaawards.com

Television coverage
- Network: NBC

The 13th ALMA Awards honors the accomplishments made by Hispanics in film, television, and music in 2011. The awards were taped on September 16, 2012 at the Pasadena Civic Auditorium for broadcast on NBC on September 21, 2012. The show was co-hosted by Eva Longoria and George Lopez, marking their third consecutive year as hosts. The awards ceremony was sponsored by the National Council of La Raza.

The winners were chosen based on online voting, box office figures, Nielsen and Billboard rankings, and Comedy..l of the NCLR ALMA Awards production leadership team.

Jennifer Lopez had nominations in all three media formats: Favorite Movie Actress Comedy/Musical; Favorite TV Reality, Variety, or Comedy Personality or Act; and Favorite Female Music Artist. Naya Rivera won both of her nominations: Favorite Female Music Artist and Favorite TV Actress Comedy. The film Savages had four overall nominations in the Favorite Acting categories, while the films The Way and Cristiada (For Greater Glory) had three overall nominations, including Favorite Movie, which was won by triple-nominee Girl in Progress.

The ceremony aired on NBC for the second consecutive and last year before moving to sister channel MSNBC.

== Winners and nominees ==
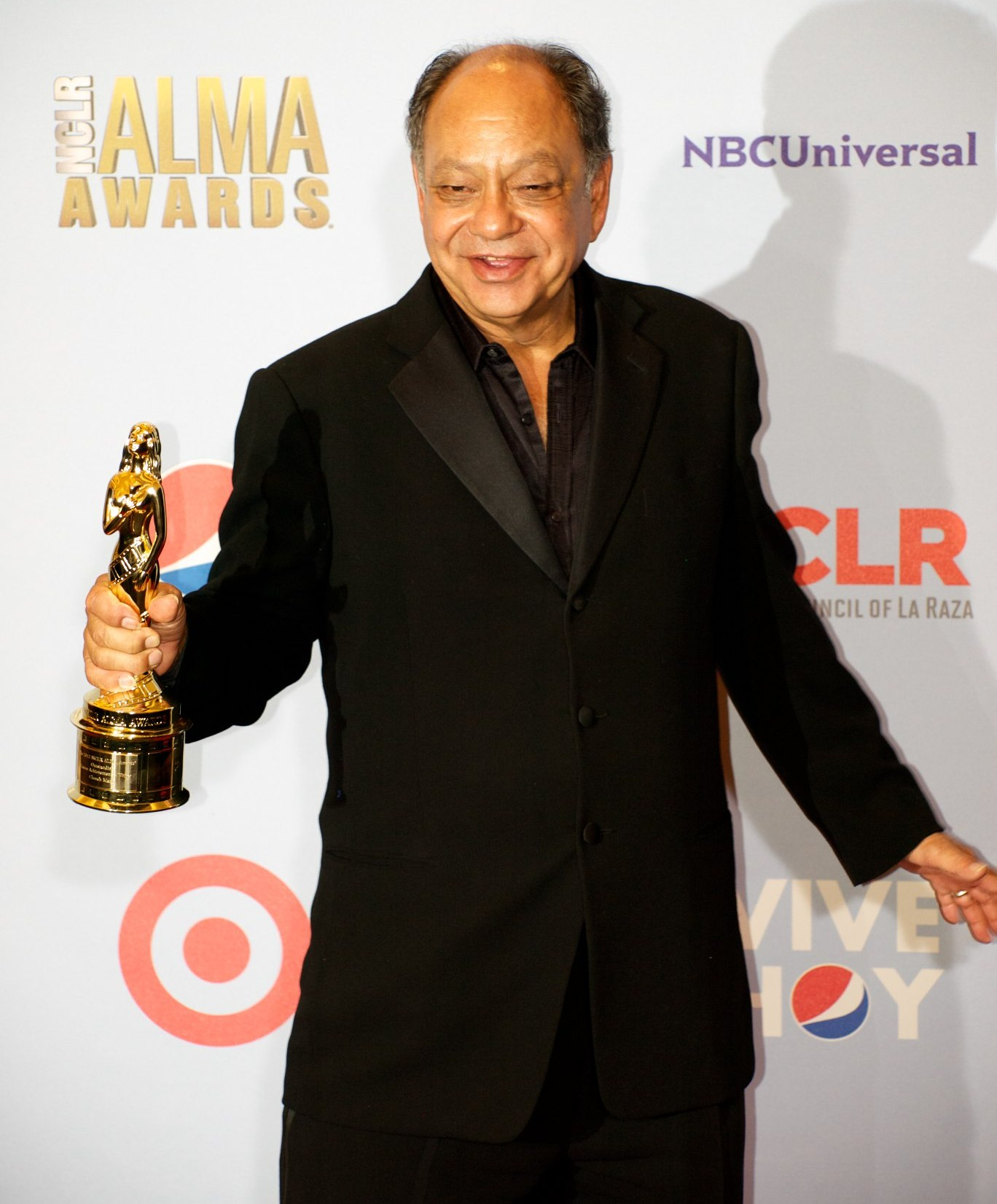
Cheech Marin holding his ALMA Career Achievement award

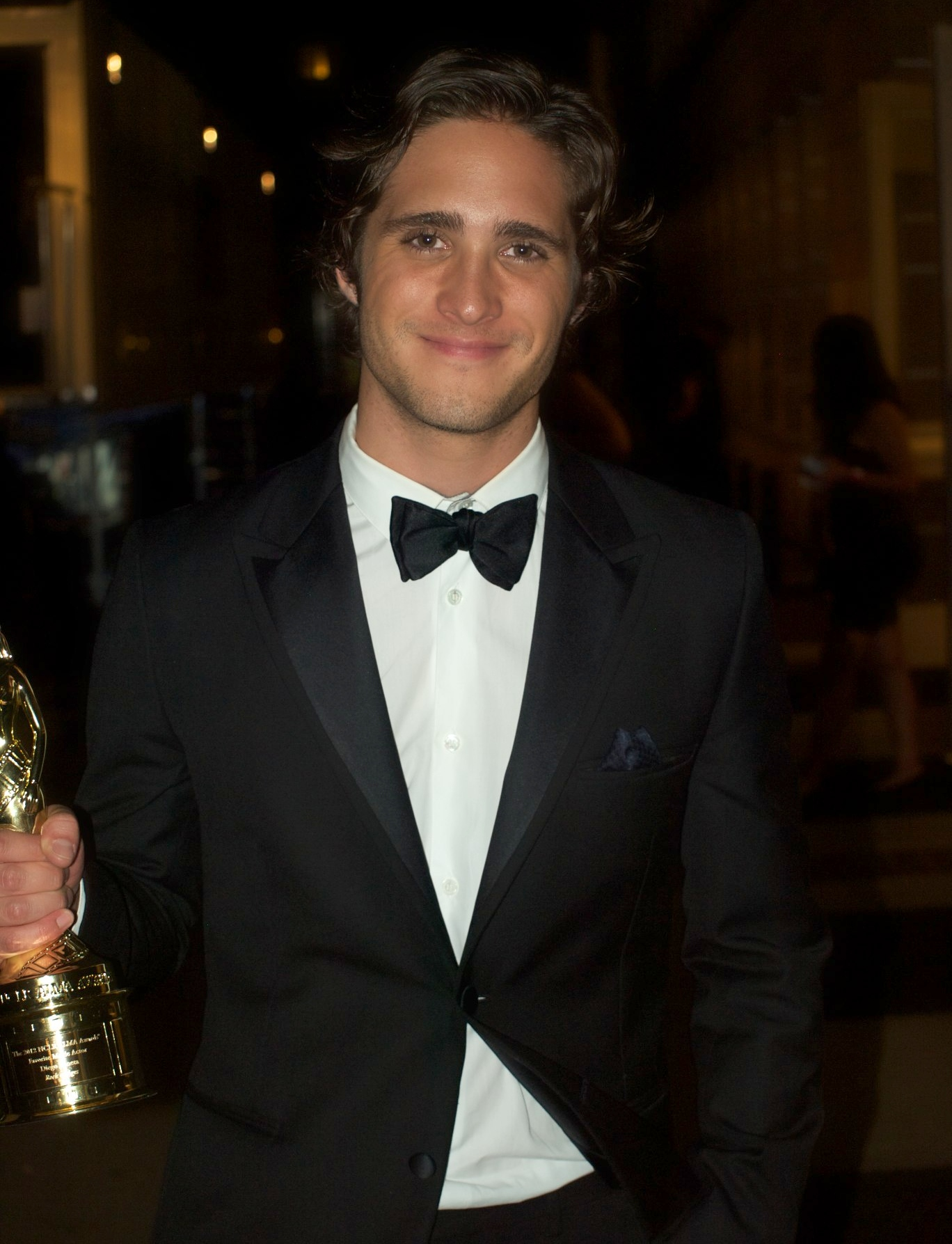
Diego Boneta, Favorite Movie Actor winner.

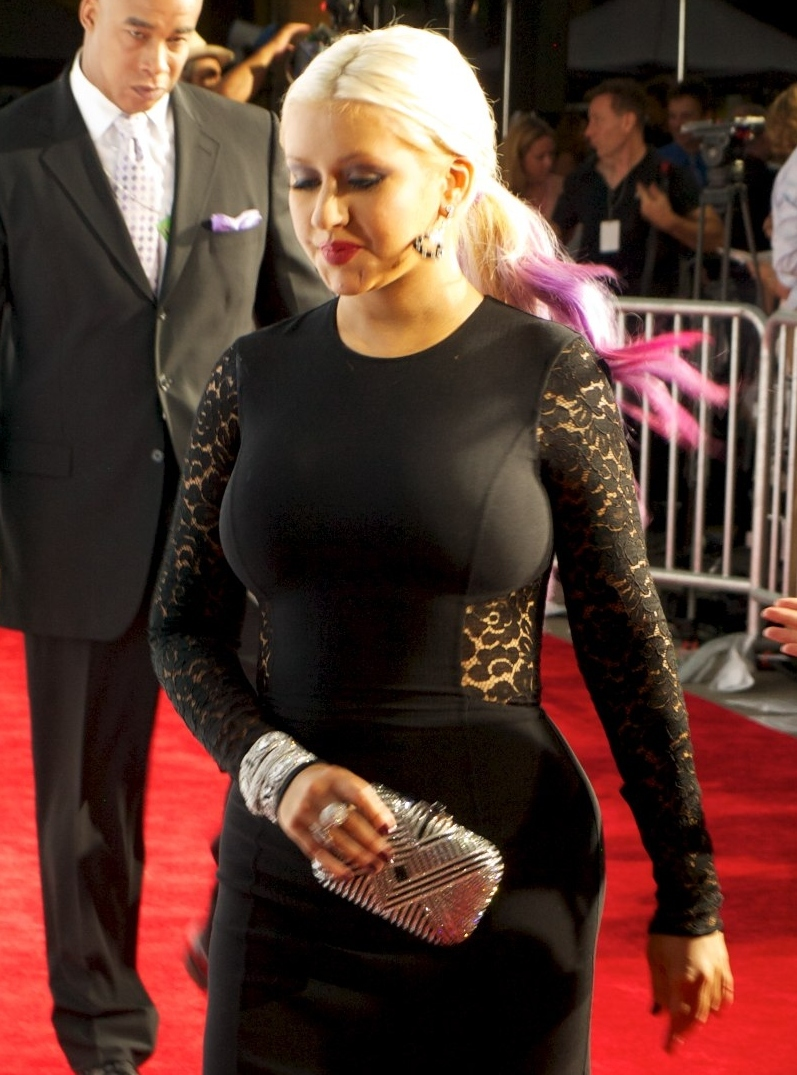
Christina Aguilera on the red carpet at the ALMA Awards

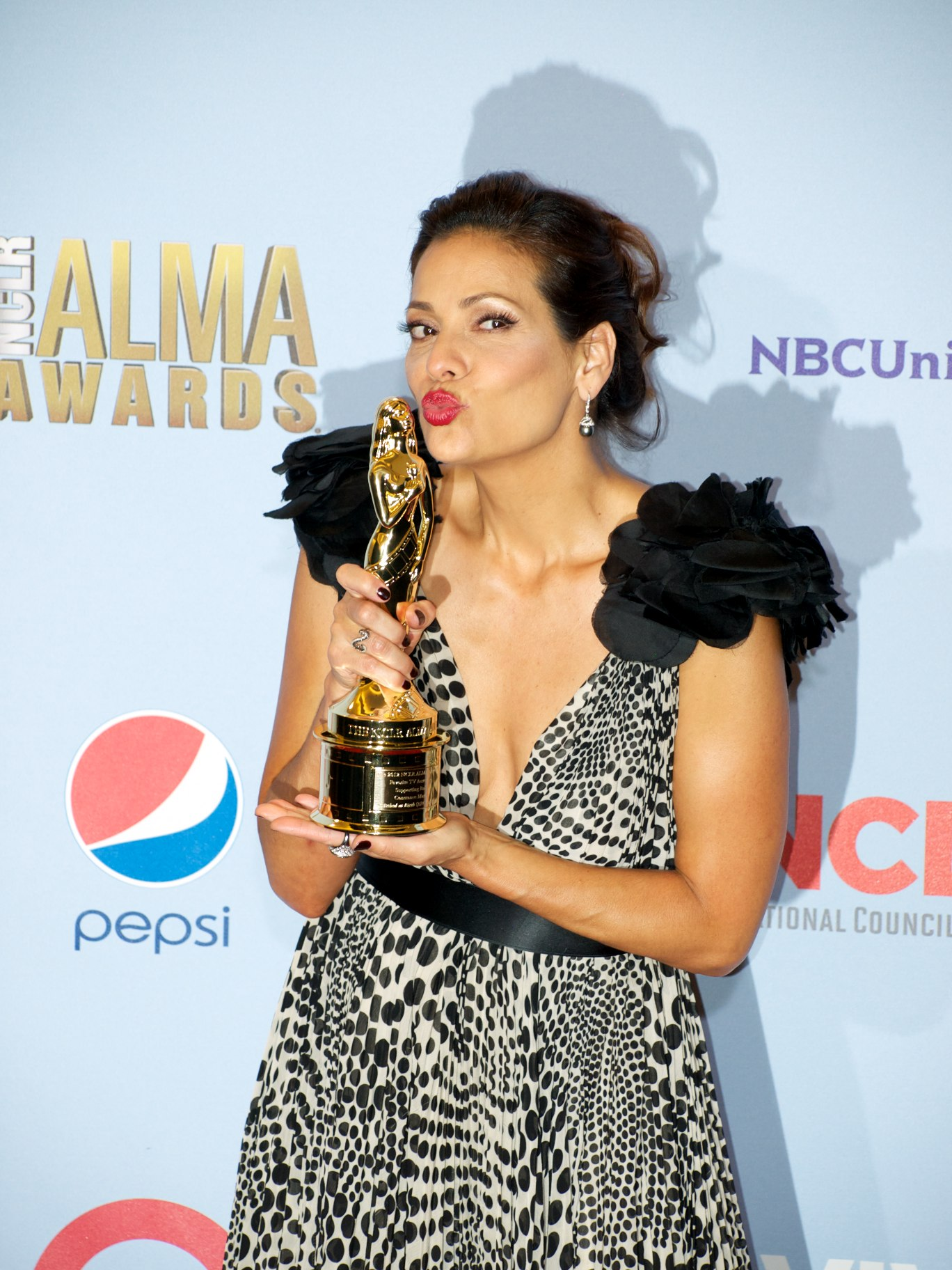
Constance Marie kissing her trophy at the ALMA Awards

The following is a list of the 65 nominees from film, television, and music. Winners are listed first and highlighted in bold:

=== Honorary awards ===
- **Henry Darrow** received the **Ricardo Montalban Lifetime Achievement Award**.
- **Cheech Marin** received an award for **Outstanding Career Achievement**.
- **Christina Aguilera** was given a **Special Achievement Award** for her career and philanthropic work.

=== Film ===
Favorite Movie	Favorite Movie Actor
**Girl in Progress**; Act of Valor; Cristiada (For Greater Glory); Puss in Boots; The Way	**Diego Boneta as Drew Boley in Rock of Ages**; Benicio del Toro as Miguel "Lado" Arroyo in Savages; Andy García as Enrique Gorostieta in Cristiada (For Greater Glory); Rodrigo Santoro as Alex in What to Expect When You're Expecting; Martin Sheen as Thomas "Tom" Avery in The Way
Favorite Movie Actress Drama/Adventure	Favorite Movie Actress Comedy/Musical
**Zoe Saldaña as Cataleya Restrepo in Colombiana**; Salma Hayek as Elena Sánchez in Savages; Eva Longoria as Tulita Gorostieta in Cristiada (For Greater Glory); Eva Mendes as Grace in Girl in Progress; Roselyn Sánchez as Morales in Act of Valor	**Aubrey Plaza as Darius Britt in Safety Not Guaranteed**; Bérénice Bejo as Peppy Miller in The Artist; Penélope Cruz as Anna in To Rome with Love; Cameron Diaz as Jules Baxter in What to Expect When You're Expecting; Jennifer Lopez as Holly in What to Expect When You're Expecting
Favorite Movie Actor Supporting Role	Favorite Movie Actress Supporting Role
**Édgar Ramírez as Ares in Wrath of the Titans**; Demián Bichir as Alex in Savages; Rubén Blades as Plutarco Elías Calles in Cristiada (For Greater Glory); Emilio Estevez as Daniel Avery in The Way; Oscar Isaac as Victoriano Ramírez in Cristiada (For Greater Glory)	**Cierra Ramirez as Ansiedad in Girl in Progress**; Mía Maestro as Dolores in Savages; Genesis Rodriguez as Angela 'Angie' Maria Lopez in Man on a Ledge; Harmony Santana as Michael in Gun Hill Road; Sofía Vergara as Lydia in The Three Stooges

=== Television ===
Favorite TV Reality, Variety, or Comedy Personality or Act	Favorite TV Actor
**Christina Aguilera as coach/mentor on The Voice**; Gabriel Iglesias as host on Gabriel Iglesias Presents Stand Up Revolution; George Lopez as host on Take Me Out; Jennifer Lopez as judge on American Idol; William Levy as contestant on Dancing with the Stars	**Tyler Posey as Scott McCall on Teen Wolf**; Benjamin Bratt as Jake Reilly on Private Practice; Danny Pino as Det. Nick Amaro on Law and Order: Special Victims Unit; James Roday as Shawn Spencer on Psych; Charlie Sheen as Dr. Charlie Goodson on Anger Management
Favorite TV Actress Drama	Favorite TV Actress Comedy
**Lana Parrilla as The Evil Queen/Regina Mills on Once Upon a Time**; Jordana Brewster as Elena Ramos on Dallas; Cote de Pablo as Ziva David on NCIS; Julie Gonzalo as Rebecca Barnes on Dallas; Madeleine Stowe as Victoria Grayson on Revenge	**Naya Rivera as Santana Lopez on Glee**; Victoria Justice as Tori Vega on Victorious; Aubrey Plaza as April Ludgate on Parks and Recreation; Bella Thorne as CeCe Jones on Shake It Up; Sofía Vergara as Gloria Pritchett on Modern Family
Favorite TV Actor Supporting Role in a Drama	Favorite TV Actor Supporting Role in a Comedy
**Jon Huertas as Detective Javier Esposito on Castle**; Guillermo Díaz as Huck on Scandal; Carlos Gómez as Dr. Carlos Sanchez on The Glades; Michael Trevino as Tyler Lockwood on The Vampire Diaries; David Zayas as Angel Batista on Dexter	**Rico Rodriguez as Manny Delgado on Modern Family**; Héctor Elizondo for Last Man Standing; Ian Gomez as Andy Torreson Cougar Town; Adam Irigoyen as Deuce Martinez on Shake It Up; Oscar Nunez as Oscar Martinez on The Office
Favorite TV Actress Supporting Role
**Constance Marie as Regina Vasquez on Switched at Birth**; Sara Ramirez as Callie Torres on Grey's Anatomy; Sarah Ramos as Haddie Braverman on Parenthood; Gina Torres as Jessica Pearson on Suits; Lauren Vélez as María LaGuerta on Dexter

=== Music ===
Favorite Male Music Artist	Favorite Female Music Artist
**Pitbull**; Bruno Mars; Ricky Martin; Romeo Santos; Santana	**Naya Rivera**; Gloria Estefan; Jennifer Lopez; Demi Lovato; Esperanza Spalding

== Televised ceremony ratings ==
The ceremony, which was televised by NBC on September 21, 2012, was watched by 2.41 million viewers.
