= Guilty Hearts =

- Film poster
- Directed by: George Augusto / George Gargurevich; Krystoff Przykucki; Paul Black; Phil Dornfield; Ravi Kumar; Savina Dellicour; Benjamin Ross
- Written by: George Augusto
- Produced by: Dominic Norris; Josie Law; Peter Soldinger; Stephen Sacks
- Starring: Eva Mendes; Julie Delpy; Stellan Skarsgård; Charlie Sheen; Anna Faris; Kathy Bates; Imelda Staunton
- Release date: June 28, 2011
- Running time: 93 minutes
- Country: United States
- Language: English

Guilty Hearts is an omnibus drama film consisting of six short stories. It is directed by George Gargurevich, Krystoff Pizykucki, Paul Black, Phil Dornfield, Ravi Kumar, and Savina Dellicour, and written by George Augusto. One source gives Gargurevich as Augusto and also includes director Benjamin Ross.

Charlie Sheen and Anna Faris star in the episode "Spelling Bee"; Eva Mendes in "Outskirts"; Julie Delpy in "Notting Hill Anxiety Festival"; Stellan Skarsgård in "Torte Bluma"; Kathy Bates in "The Ingrate"; and Imelda Staunton in "Ready".

It was produced by Dominic Norris, Josie Law, Peter Soldinger, and Stephen Sacks.

== Cast ==
Source unless otherwise noted:

- Kathy Bates as The Judge
- Julie Delpy as Charlotte
  - Harriet Rogers as Young Charlotte
- Andrea Di Stefano as The Ingrate
- Anna Faris as Jane Conelly
- Frank Gallegos as Francisco
- Eva Mendes as Gabriella
- Charles Rubendall as SS Officer
- Charlie Sheen as himself
- Stellan Skarsgård as Stangl
- Imelda Staunton as Naomi
- Gerard Butler

== Home Release ==
It was released on DVD in the U.S. by Phase 4 Films on June 28, 2011.
