= Cierra Ramirez =

American actress and singer (born 1995)

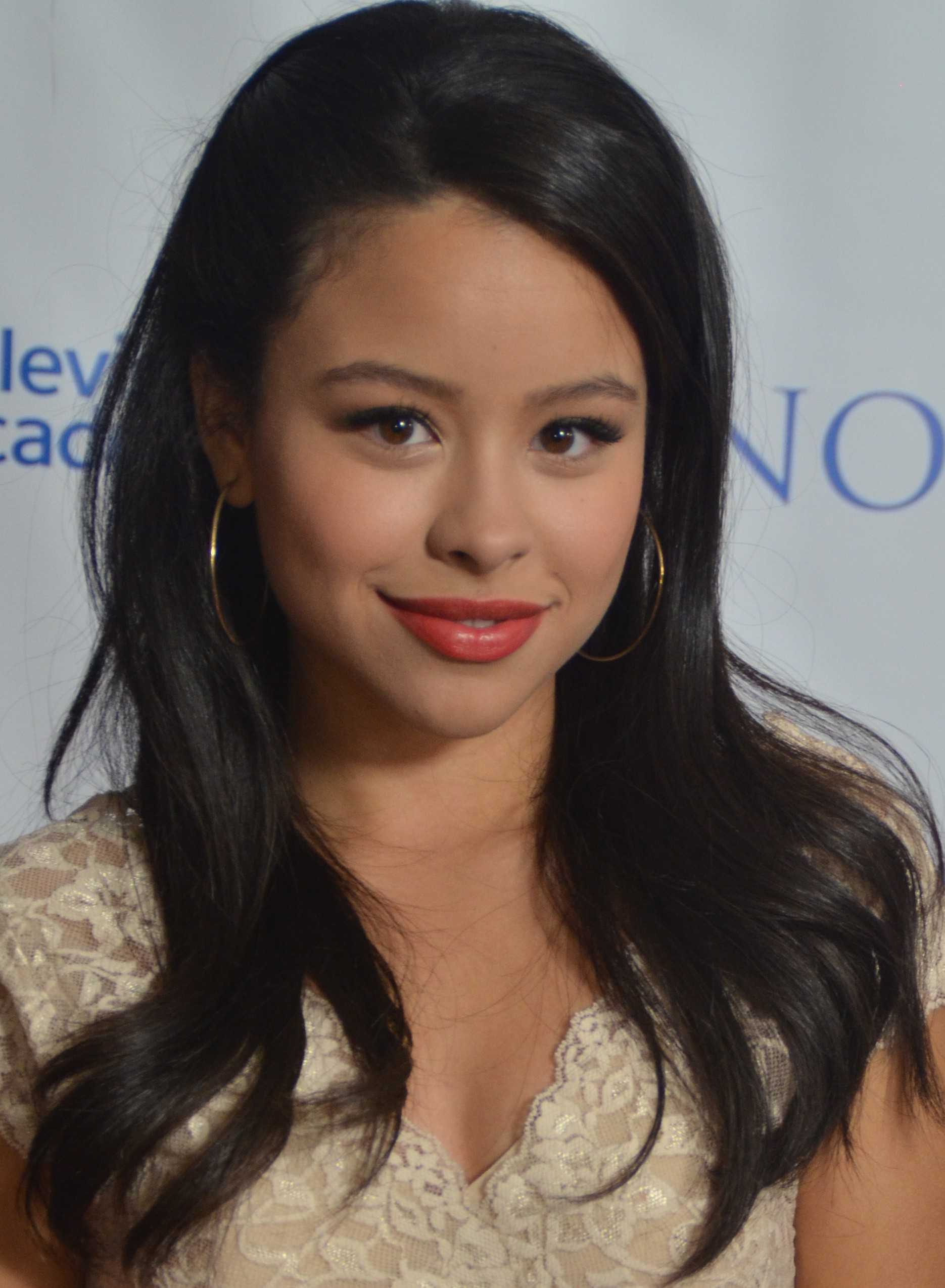
- Ramirez at the 7th Annual Television Academy Honors on June 1, 2014
- Born: Cierra Alexa Ramirez; March 9, 1995 (age 31); Houston, Texas, U.S.
- Occupations: Actress; singer
- Years active: 2005–present
- Spouse: Jonathan Zallez (m. 2025)

Cierra Alexa Ramirez (born March 9, 1995) is an American actress and singer. She is best known for playing Mariana Adams Foster in the Freeform television series The Fosters and reprising her role in the spin-off series Good Trouble, which she also co-executive produced with co-star Maia Mitchell. Her accolades include an ALMA Award and a GLAAD Media Award nomination.

== Early life ==
Ramirez was born on March 9, 1995, in Houston, Texas. Her father, Sonny Ramirez, was a music producer and her mother, Cris Ramirez, was a kindergarten teacher. Ramirez was raised in Sugar Land, Texas, and attended Westside High School for two years before moving to Los Angeles, California. She graduated high school through a home-school program to allow her to pursue her acting career.

== Career ==
=== Music ===
Music led to Ramirez making her television debut—when she was 10 years old, she performed a song the "Apollo Kids Star of Tomorrow" segment of Showtime at the Apollo. Ramirez is signed to Empire and Tribeca Music Group. She has performed as the opening act for a number of musical acts, including Earth, Wind & Fire, Chicago and Ruben Studdard.

On June 20, 2016, Ramirez released her first EP Discreet. Her singles subsequently followed her first EP: "Faded" feat. Baeza in 2017. In 2018, Ramirez released the first single “Bad Boys” off of her debut album, Over Your Head, which was released February 28, 2020. Singles that followed “Bad Boys” were; “Liquid Courage (Love Me Better)", "Broke Us" Feat. Trevor Jackson in 2019 and “Over Your Head” in 2020. Music videos for the singles "Faded", "Bad Boys", "Liquid Courage" and "Broke Us" were released. "Liquid Courage (Love Me Better)", "Broke Us", and “BBU” were directed by Maria Skobeleva.

=== Acting ===
In 2007, Ramirez played a recurring role on the Disney Channel series The Suite Life of Zack & Cody as Jasmine, a young camper with anger management issues. Ramirez played recurring character Kathy in The Secret Life of the American Teenager, introduced in the 100th episode as a pregnant freshman.

Ramirez had her film debut in the titular role for the 2012 feature film Girl in Progress, for which she won an ALMA Award for Favorite Movie Actress Supporting Role.

Starting in 2013, Ramirez played Mariana Foster in the ABC Family (renamed "Freeform" channel) series The Fosters. Her character is a straight-A student who, with her fraternal twin Jesus, has been adopted by a lesbian couple into a multi-ethnic blended family. The show premiered on June 3, 2013, and in January 2017, Freeform announced that it had been renewed for its fifth season. However, according to Entertainment Weekly, the series would be cancelled after a three-night limited series on June 6, 2018, to be followed with a spin off, Good Trouble premiering January 9, 2019, featuring Ramirez and Maia Mitchell. Ramirez was the only actor that has appeared in every episode throughout both series' run.

In 2017, Ramirez starred in the Lifetime film Drink, Slay, Love co-produced by Bella Thorne and based on the novel by Sarah Beth Durst. Her character is a vampire who becomes immune to sunlight after a freak accident.

== Personal life ==
Ramirez is of Colombian and Mexican descent.

She dated YouTuber and comedian Jeff Wittek in 2015 for three years.

Since 2019, she has been in a relationship with musician OTHRSYDE, also known as Jonathan Zallez. They announced their engagement in September 2023. The couple were married at The Lafayette Hotel & Club in San Diego, California on September 13, 2025.

== Discography ==
=== Albums ===
Title	Details	Peak charts
Over Your Head	Released: February 28, 2020; Label: Tribeca Music Group/ Empire; Formats: Digital download	#15 on the US Pop iTunes Charts

=== Extended plays ===
Title	Details	Peak charts	Notes
Discreet	Released: June 20, 2016; Label: Tribeca Music Group; Formats: Digital download	-	—N/a

=== Singles ===
Title	Year	Album
"Faded" (featuring Casey Veggies & Honey Cocaine)	2016	Discreet
"Faded" (featuring Baeza)	2017	Non-album single
"Bad Boys"	2018	Over Your Head
"Liquid Courage (Love Me Better)"	2019	Over Your Head
"Broke Us" (featuring Trevor Jackson)	2019	Over Your Head
"Love Me Ole (Latin Remix)" (with Maejor & C-Kan)	2019	Non-album single
"Over Your Head"	2020	Over Your Head
"BBU"	2020	Over Your Head

=== Other appearances ===
Title	Year	Other artist(s)	Album
"Círculo"	2019	Coastcity	1190 (EP)

=== Music videos ===
List of music videos, showing year released and director
Title	Year	Other artist(s)	Director(s)
"Faded"	2016	Casey Veggies & Honey C	Austin Kelley
"Faded"	2017	Baeza	Keoni Marcelo
"Bad Boys"	2018	None	Arrad Rahgoshay
"Liquid Courage (Love Me Better)"	2019	None	Maria Skobeleva
"Broke Us"	2019	Trevor Jackson	Maria Skobeleva
"Love Me Ole (Latin Remix)"	2019	Major & C-Kan	Gabe Bostetler
"Over Your Head"	2020	None	Riley Robbins
"BBU" (Vertical Video)	2020	None	Maria Skobeleva

== Filmography ==
=== Film ===
Year	Title	Role	Notes
2006	All In	Marisol	Supporting role
2012	Girl in Progress	Ansiedad	Lead role
2016	Petting Scorpions	Daisy	Lead role
2018	Marvel Rising: Secret Warriors	America Chavez	Voice role
2023	The Re-Education of Molly Singer	Lindsay	Supporting role

=== Television ===
Year	Title	Role	Notes
2005	Showtime at the Apollo	Herself	October 29, 2005
2006	CSI: Miami	Isabel Terraza	Episode: "Deviant"
2006	Zoey 101	Girl #1	Episode: "Surprise"
2006	Desperate Housewives	Annie Marie	Episode: "Children and Art"
2007	The Suite Life of Zack & Cody	Jasmine	Recurring role (4 episodes)
2007	Star and Stella Save the World	Stella Rivera	Television films
2008	My Own Worst Enemy	Ruthy Spivey	Scenes deleted
2012	Piper's Quick Picks	Herself	Guest
2012	The Talk	Herself	
2012–2013	The Secret Life of the American Teenager	Kathy	Recurring role (22 episodes)
2013–2018	The Fosters	Mariana Adams Foster	Main role
2017	Drink, Slay, Love	Pearl	Television film
2019–2024	Good Trouble	Mariana Adams Foster	Main role; also executive producer; director: "Party of One"
2019	Marvel Rising: Chasing Ghosts	America Chavez	Voice
2019	Marvel Rising: Heart of Iron	America Chavez	Voice
2019	Marvel Rising: Battle of the Bands	America Chavez	Voice

== Awards and nominations ==
Year	Award	Category	Nominated work	Result
2012	Imagen Foundation Awards	Best Supporting Actress/Feature Film	Girl in Progress	Won
2012	ALMA Award	Favorite Movie Actress-Supporting Role	Girl in Progress	Won
2012	The National Hispanic Foundation for the Arts	Horizon Award		Won
2014	Teen Choice Awards	Choice Summer TV Star: Female	The Fosters	Nominated
2014	HOLA Awards	Honoring Award	The Fosters	Won
2017	Teen Choice Awards	Choice Summer TV Actress	The Fosters	Nominated
2019	Teen Choice Awards	Choice Drama TV Actress	Good Trouble	Nominated
2022	GLAAD Media Awards	Outstanding Drama Series	Good Trouble	Nominated
2023	GLAAD Media Awards	Outstanding Drama Series	Good Trouble	Nominated
2024	GLAAD Media Awards	Outstanding Drama Series	Good Trouble	Nominated
