= Under the Same Moon =

2007 film by Patricia Riggen

- U.S. theatrical release poster
- Directed by: Patricia Riggen
- Written by: Ligiah Villalobos
- Produced by: Patricia Riggen; Gerardo Barrera
- Starring: Adrián Alonso; Kate del Castillo; Eugenio Derbez; Maya Zapata; Carmen Salinas; María Rojo; Mario Almada; America Ferrera; Los Tigres del Norte
- Cinematography: Checco Varese
- Edited by: Aleshka Ferrero
- Music by: Carlo Siliotto
- Production companies: Potomac Pictures; Creando Films; Fidecine
- Distributed by: Fox Searchlight Pictures The Weinstein Company (United States); 20th Century Fox (Mexico)
- Release dates: January 21, 2007 (Sundance); March 19, 2008 (United States); March 20, 2008 (Mexico)
- Running time: 104 minutes
- Countries: Mexico; United States
- Languages: Spanish; English
- Budget: $1.7 million
- Box office: $23.3 million

Under the Same Moon (Spanish: (Bajo) La misma luna) is a 2007 drama film directed by Patricia Riggen (in her feature film directorial debut), written by Ligiah Villalobos, and starring Kate del Castillo, Adrián Alonso, and Eugenio Derbez. The film follows nine-year-old Carlitos and his mother, Rosario. To give her son a better life, Rosario works illegally in the U.S. while Carlitos stays in Mexico with his grandmother. When unforeseen events unfold, both Rosario and Carlitos undertake separate journeys, striving to reunite.

Under the Same Moon premiered on January 21, 2007, at the Sundance Film Festival, where it received a standing ovation. It was released in the United States by Fox Searchlight Pictures and The Weinstein Company on March 19, 2008, and in Mexico by 20th Century Fox the following day. It received generally favorable reviews. Critics praised the film's ability to humanize the U.S. immigration debate but noted that its sentimental approach softens the harsher realities of the issue.

== Plot ==
Rosario, a single mother, illegally crossed the US-Mexico border to Los Angeles, leaving behind her young son, Carlitos, in his Mexican hometown with his ailing grandmother. As a part of their weekly calls, Rosario describes the area around the payphone to Carlitos in detail. On his ninth birthday, after his grandmother unexpectedly dies in her sleep, Carlitos learns that his aunt and uncle are trying to take custody of him for his mother's remittances.

Determined to reunite with his mother, Carlitos pays coyotes to help him cross through El Paso–Juárez into Mexico. However, the coyotes' car is towed by police for unrelated offenses. Carlitos exits the vehicle in a lot in El Paso, Texas, unwittingly dropping his money. Unable to buy a bus ticket alone, Carlitos asks a man to buy him a ticket. Realizing he has lost his money, Carlitos offers the man $100 to drive him to the impound lot, but upon arriving, Carlitos can't find the money. In desperation, the man tries to sell Carlitos to a pimp, but a local woman intervenes, taking Carlitos in and introducing him to life with other undocumented immigrants. One of the immigrants agrees to take Carlitos to Los Angeles after they get off work. Carlitos decides to help them as they work, however immigration officers raid the tomato farm. Carlitos escapes with an immigrant named Enrique, who initially wants nothing to do with him. The two hitchhike to Tucson, Arizona, where an angered Enrique tells Carlitos to leave. Seeing that some men are about to steal his backpack, Enrique decides to save Carlitos, who manages to gain employment for both Enrique and himself at a restaurant. Carlitos looks up his absent father, Oscar Aguilar Pons, and with Enrique's help, they meet. Oscar promises to help but ultimately abandons Carlitos, leaving Carlitos disappointed. Enrique decides to take Carlitos to Los Angeles. The two take a bus ride and reach LA. Meanwhile, Rosario loses one of her jobs due to racism.

Following an address, Carlitos and Enrique arrive in East LA, only to find a PO box. Carlitos and Enrique decide to search the city for the payphone his mother calls from. After a day of unsuccessful searching, the two rest on a bench (while she unknowingly walks right past them). Rosario after much persuasion from her friend decides to marry a U.S. citizen to for a green card however decides to bail last minute. Suddenly, Doña Carmen calls Rosario, letting her know that Carlitos crossed the border and that her mother is dead. Rosario, hearing this, decides to go back to Mexico to search for Carlitos. When boarding the bus, she sees a little boy at a payphone out the window of the bus at the bus station, and she realizes that Carlitos does know where to find her. In the morning, Enrique and Carlitos get surprised by a pair of police officers, and Enrique, noticing that Carlitos is about to be apprehended, throws his coffee at the cops to distract them. Enrique shouts to Carlitos to run away, which he does, but Enrique is arrested.

Carlitos finally finds the payphone and Rosario. They see each other across the street. Rosario yells to her son not to cross yet. The crosswalk light turns from the "red hand" light to the "white figure walking" light, and the credits roll.

== Production ==
Principal photography began on April 24, 2006 and wrapped on May 31, 2006. Filming took place in both Mexico and the United States in order to realistically portray the journey of a young boy crossing the border to reunite with his mother. Key scenes were shot in East Los Angeles (4 days of shooting), where much of the story is set, as well as in locations in Mexico (34 days) that reflect the protagonist’s hometown. The production used many locations in and around Mexico to portray areas in the United States; like Tucson, New Mexico, and Los Angeles. The production aimed to authentically depict the experiences of immigrant families, particularly the emotional and social challenges they face.

== Cast ==
- Kate del Castillo as Rosario Reyes
- Adrián Alonso as Carlitos Reyes
- Eugenio Derbez as Enrique
- Maya Zapata as Alicia
- Carmen Salinas as Doña Carmen
- María Rojo as Reyna
- Mario Almada as Padrino
- America Ferrera as Martha
- Los Tigres del Norte as themselves
- Angelina Peláez as Benita Reyes
- Gabriel Porras as Paco
- Jesse Garcia as David
- Ignacio Guadalupe as Leonardo Sánchez Nava
- Pailo Heitz as Billy
- Ernesto D'Alessio as Oscar Ponce
- Isaac Bravo as Chito
- Gustavo Sánchez Parra as Manuel
- Catalina López as Josefina
- Yvette Mercedes as Agent Patrulla Fronteriza
- Jacqueline Voltaire as Mrs. McKenzie
- Darwyn Roanhorse as motel owner
- Sonya Smith as Mrs. Snyder
- Jorge Rojas as Mr. Snyder

== Release ==
Under the Same Moon premiered at the Sundance Film Festival on January 21, 2007. It was released in theaters in the United States on March 19, 2008, by Fox Searchlight Pictures and The Weinstein Company, and in Mexico on March 20, by 20th Century Fox.

== Reception ==
The film received generally favorable reviews from critics. On the review aggregator website Rotten Tomatoes, 72% of 92 critics' reviews are positive. The website's consensus reads: "If Under the Same Moon is often manipulative, it is also heartfelt, and features strong performances from its leads." Metacritic, which uses a weighted average, assigned the film a score of 59 out of 100, based on 24 critics, indicating "mixed or average" reviews.

Jeannette Catsoulis of The New York Times wrote, "This is screenwriting by numbers." The film received a standing ovation when it was shown at the Sundance Film Festival.

== Home media ==
Under the Same Moon was released on DVD June 17, 2008, in the United States.
