= Latin World Entertainment =

Mass media company

Latin World Entertainment Inc.
- Type: Private
- Industry: Entertainment
- Founded: 1994; 32 years ago in Miami, Florida, U.S.
- Founders: Sofía Vergara; Melissa Escobar; Luis Balaguer
- Headquarters: Beverly Hills, California, United States
- Key people: Luis Balaguer (CEO)
- Products: Talent management Production company
- Website: latinwe.com

Latin World Entertainment Holdings (also LWE or LatinWE) is an American talent management, production company and entertainment marketing firm, with offices in Beverly Hills and Miami.

The company was founded by Sofía Vergara, Melissa Escobar, and Luis Balaguer in 1994. LWE is a multi-service company, providing publicity, licensing, endorsements, brand integration, and content development for their clients. It is a common choice among Hollywood producers when seeking Hispanic talent.

== Clients ==
- Sofía Vergara
- Calle y Poché
- Little Vale
- Sebastián Villalobos
- Juan Jaramillo
- Xime Ponch
- Pautips
- Andrew Ponch
- Katy Esquivel
- Juana Martinez
- Mario Ruiz
- Daniel Patiño (Paisa)
- Maria Laura Quintero
- Mario Selman
- Matthew Windey
- Priscila Gonzalez
- Issa Vásquez
- Raúl De Molina
- Nacho Figueras
- Gaby Espino
- Rafael Amaya
- Enrique Alejandro
- Cristián de la Fuente
- Myrka Dellanos
- Blanca Soto
- Karla Monroig
- Maritza Rodríguez
- Elizabeth Gutiérrez
- Ingrid Hoffmann
- Giselle Blondet
- Fernando del Rincón
- Alejandra Espinoza
- Johnny Lozada
- Rodner Figueroa
- Ana Brenda Contreras
- Pamela Silva Conde
- Maxi Iglesias
- Evaluna Montaner
- Ariadna Gutiérrez

== Filmography ==
=== Television ===
- ¡Viva Hollywood! (with World of Wonder Productions) (2008)
- Killer Women (with Electus and ABC Studios) (2014)
- Su nombre era Dolores, la Jenn que yo conocí (with BTF Media) (2017)
- El secreto de Selena (with BTF Media) (2018)

=== Film ===
- Don't Mess with Texas (with New Line Cinema, Metro-Goldwyn-Mayer, and Pacific Standard) (2015)
- Koati (with Upstairs) (2021)
