= Checco Varese =

Peruvian-born cinematographer

- Born: Francesco Varese; Lima, Peru
- Occupation: Cinematographer
- Years active: 1993–present
- Organization: American Society of Cinematographers
- Spouse: Patricia Riggen
- Children: 1

Francesco "Checco" Varese is a Peruvian-born cinematographer working in feature film and television.

== Filmography ==
=== Film ===
Year	Title	Director	Notes
2000	Dust to Dust	Juan Carlos de Llaca	
2001	Night at the Golden Eagle	Adam Rifkin	
2002	Moctezuma's Revenge	Jorge Riggen	
2005	The Aura	Fabián Bielinsky	
2007	Under the Same Moon	Patricia Riggen	Also credited as co-producer
2008	Prom Night	Nelson McCormick	
2009	The New Daughter	Luis Berdejo	
2011	5 Days of War	Renny Harlin	
2012	Girl in Progress	Patricia Riggen	
2015	The 33	Patricia Riggen	
2016	Miracles from Heaven	Patricia Riggen	
2016	Ice Scream	Roberto De Feo; Vito Palumbo	With Colby Oliver
2018	Replicas	Jeffrey Nachmanoff	
2019	It Chapter Two	Andy Muschietti	
2025	G20	Patricia Riggen	
2026	Ebenezer	Ti West	

=== Television ===
TV movies

Year	Title	Director
1998	Lost in the Bermuda Triangle	Norberto Barba
1999	Primal Force	Nelson McCormick
2002	Fidel	David Attwood
2003	Comfort and Joy	Maggie Greenwald
2004	A Separate Peace	Peter Yates
2005	Their Eyes Were Watching God	Darnell Martin
2005	Global Frequency	Nelson McCormick
2009	Last of the Ninth	Carl Franklin
2011	Lemonade Mouth	Patricia Riggen
2013	Lovestruck: The Musical	Sanaa Hamri
2015	Occult	Rob Bowman
2015	The Adversaries	Stephen Cragg
2017	The Get	James Strong
2019	Surveillance	Patricia Riggen

Television

Year	Title	Director	Notes
2006	Emily's Reasons Why Not	Michael Patrick Jann	Episode "Pilot"
2006	The Unit	Davis Guggenheim	Episode "First Responders"
2007	Hustle	Alrick Riley	Episode "Big Daddy Calling"
2007	Life	David Semel	Episode "Pilot: Merit Badge"
2008	True Blood	Alan Ball; John Dahl	Episodes "Strange Love" and "Mine"
2009	Melrose Place	Davis Guggenheim	Episode "Pilot"
2010	The Defenders	Davis Guggenheim	Episode "Pilot"
2011	The Nine Lives of Chloe King	Wendey Stanzler	Episode "Pilot"
2013	The Fosters	Timothy Busfield	Episode "Pilot"
2013-2014	Reign	Brad Silberling	Episode "Pilot"; Uncredited for other 6 episodes
2014	The Strain	Guillermo del Toro; Deran Sarafian; Phil Abraham	Episodes "Night Zero", "The Third Rail" and "The Master"
2015	Point of Honor	Randall Wallace	
2015	The Returned	Keith Gordon; Vincenzo Natali	Episodes "Camille" and "Simon"
2016	Colony	Juan José Campanella	Episode "Pilot"
2016	No Tomorrow	Brad Silberling	Episode "Pilot"
2018	Jack Ryan	Patricia Riggen	Episodes "Black 22", "End of Honor" and "The Boy"
2019	Proven Innocent	Patricia Riggen	Episode "Pilot"
2021	Them	Nelson Cragg; Daniel Stamm; Janicza Bravo; Ti West	6 episodes
2021	Dopesick	Barry Levinson; Patricia Riggen; Danny Strong	4 episodes
2022	Unbroken	Bronwen Hughes	
2023	Daisy Jones & the Six	James Ponsoldt; Will Graham	6 episodes
2024	Under the Bridge	Geeta Patel; Dinh Thai	Episodes "Looking Glass" and "Three and Seven"
2025	Pulse	Kate Dennis	Episodes "Abby" and "Alone Time"
2026	The Terminal List	Paul Cameron	Episodes "Romulus S.V." and "Warrior in a Garden"

== Awards and nominations ==
Year	Award	Category	Title	Result
2006	Argentine Film Critics Association	Best Cinematography	The Aura	Won
2015	Camerimage	Golden Frog	The 33	Nominated
2021	Camerimage	Golden Frog	Them (For episode "Day 1")	Nominated
2021	Primetime Emmy Awards	Outstanding Cinematography	Dopesick	Won

== External link ==
- Checco Varese at IMDb
