= Girl in Progress =

2012 film by Patricia Riggen

- Theatrical release poster
- Directed by: Patricia Riggen
- Written by: Hiram Martinez
- Produced by: Benjamin Odell; John Fiedler
- Starring: Eva Mendes; Matthew Modine; Cierra Ramirez; Patricia Arquette; Eugenio Derbez
- Cinematography: Checco Varese
- Edited by: Dan Schalk
- Music by: Christopher Lennertz
- Production company: Pantelion Films
- Distributed by: Lionsgate
- Release date: May 11, 2012
- Running time: 93 minutes
- Country: United States
- Languages: English; Spanish
- Box office: $3,125,320

Girl in Progress is a 2012 American drama film directed by Patricia Riggen, written by Hiram Martinez, and starring Eva Mendes, Matthew Modine, Patricia Arquette, Eugenio Derbez, and introducing Cierra Ramirez in her film debut as Ansiedad Gutierrez.

The plot follows the 14-year-old Ansiedad, who lives with her busy mother Grace and ends up acting like a grown-up and going through different tasks on her personal list, believing she can speed up the maturing process and become independent more quickly.

The film received a limited release on May 11, 2012. It received the Favorite Movie Award at the 2012 ALMA Awards, which honors the accomplishments made by Hispanics in film, television, and music. Cierra Ramirez won the Favorite Movie Actress Supporting Role Award.

== Plot ==
Grace Gutierrez is a single mom raising her teenage daughter Ansiedad. She is busy juggling work, bills, and her relationship with the married Dr. Harford. So, Ansiedad must take care of herself as well as her mother most of the time.

When Ansiedad's English teacher Ms. Armstrong inspires her with coming-of-age lessons, Ansiedad decides to rebel. She wants to grow up quickly, to become mature enough to move out. Ansiedad creates a list of must-do tasks to reach her big goal: run away to New York.

Ansiedad's first task is to remind everyone that she is a good girl – she signs up for the school's chess team and wins a match, and goes to a nursing home and regularly visits an old woman who Ansiedad names 'Maud'. Next, she must befriend the most popular girl in school, Valerie. After much humiliation and bribery, Ansiedad successfully completes this task, but must betray her best friend Tavita to make this happen, calling her fat and useless.

Tavita begins to cry from Ansiedad's harsh comments and runs off to her boyfriend Ferguson. Ansiedad witnesses him harshly breaking up with her, saying what they do in his basement will never mean they will be together. After Ferguson storms away, a crying Tavita tells Ansiedad that she was never there for her and that she hates her.

Ansiedad moves onto her next tasks, to have her first kiss and lose her virginity. For these, she targets one of the most popular boys in school, the supposed womanizer Trevor. Ansiedad confirms that he will be at a particular party that night, then asks him to take her virginity there. He agrees, and they kiss awkwardly.

Ansiedad checks "first kiss" off her list, disappointing Trevor, who thought she might have liked him. At the party, he takes her to an upstairs bedroom, much to Valerie's anger. Locking the door, Trevor tells Ansiedad that he thinks she is pretty, but she tells him off for being nice.

Trevor then tells Ansiedad that he only acts as a womanizer to bug his dad, but she says she does not care. As she strips down and gets into bed, she realizes how scared she is, changing her mind when a naked Trevor emerges from the bathroom. She quickly dresses and runs out where Valerie stops her and calls her a slut.

The party guests refuse to believe Ansiedad's protests that she and Trevor did not have sex, which is made worse when he yells out that they did. She runs home, crying out for her mother, who is not home. Ansiedad trashes the house in anger and cries herself to sleep.

Grace had fallen asleep at the house of her co-worker Mission Impossible, who is in love with her. She wakes in the morning to find Mission gone. Grace hurries to work and finds that someone has robbed the family-owned business' money, which means they will be closing down. She finds Mission in the back of the restaurant and he tells her he stole the money to cover Ansiedad's tuition. Grace calls him an idiot and he promises to return the money.

When Grace sees Ms. Armstrong about Ansiedad, she learns what she has been doing, and the teacher reprimands her for her negligence. The teen has boarded a bus to New York, only to be stopped by her mother. Ansiedad and Grace argue, but Grace stops her by saying "I don't want what happened to your friend to happen to you". Ansiedad learns that Tavita took weight pills and almost died. The two hug, then wait at Tavita's to see how she is.

Ms. Armstrong gives Ansiedad's class their last assignment for the year: write a conclusion about coming of age stories. A series of shots show that Mission returns the money, Ansiedad starts to dress and act like a normal 14-year-old, and Grace watches Ansiedad‘s chess tournament, embarrassing her with enthusiastic cheering, although Ansiedad is secretly happy Grace is there.

Ansiedad apologizes to Tavita who hugs her. When Tavita asks her if she wants to hang out, Ansiedad smiles and says her mom is waiting for her. Grace and Ansiedad then board a city bus home.

== Cast ==
- Eva Mendes as Grace Gutierrez, a woman who considers herself a hard working mother, but Ansiedad begs to differ because Grace is never home when Ansiedad needs her and she puts herself before her daughter.
- Matthew Modine as Dr. Harford, Grace's boyfriend who is a gynecologist and a married man.
- Cierra Ramirez as Ansiedad "Ann" Gutierrez, is a hardworking 14-year-old girl who is never noticed by her mother and plots to runaway and start her adulthood young.
- Patricia Arquette as Ms. Armstrong, Ansiedad's English teacher.
- Eugenio Derbez as Mission Impossible, a co-worker of Grace who sympathizes her plight.
- Raini Rodriguez as Tavita, Ansiedad's best friend.
- Russell Peters as Emile
- Brenna O'Brien as Valerie, a popular girl that Ansiedad befriends.
- Landon Liboiron as Trevor, a popular womanizing student.
- Anna Maria Estrada as Tavita's Mom
- Kendall Cross as Alice Hartford
- Blu Mankuma as Principal
- Rady Panov as Ferguson, Tavita's boyfriend.
- Colin Foo as Lo Mein
- Patti Allan as Woman
- Lossen Chambers as Lady Customer

== Reception ==
On the review aggregator website Rotten Tomatoes, 34% of 44 critics' reviews are positive. The website's consensus reads: "Despite a well-intentioned and novel premise, Girl in Progress is plagued by jarring tonal shifts and does little to break its characters out of cliché." Metacritic, which uses a weighted average, assigned the film a score of 45 out of 100, based on 17 critics, indicating "mixed or average" reviews.

=== Awards ===
Year	Award	Category	Nominee	Result
2012	Imagen Foundation Awards	Best Supporting Actress/Feature Film	Cierra Ramirez	Won
2012	ALMA Awards	Favorite Movie		Won
2012	ALMA Awards	Favorite Movie Actress-Supporting Role	Cierra Ramirez	Won
2013	Premios Juventud	Favorite Flick		Won
