= The 33 =

2015 film by Patricia Riggen

- Theatrical release poster
- Directed by: Patricia Riggen
- Screenplay by: Mikko Alanne; Craig Borten; Michael Thomas
- Story by: José Rivera
- Based on: Deep Down Dark by Héctor Tobar
- Produced by: Robert Katz; Edward McGurn; Mike Medavoy
- Starring: Antonio Banderas; Rodrigo Santoro; Juliette Binoche; James Brolin; Lou Diamond Phillips; Mario Casas; Adriana Barraza; Kate del Castillo; Cote de Pablo; Bob Gunton; Gabriel Byrne
- Cinematography: Checco Varese
- Edited by: Michael Tronick
- Music by: James Horner
- Production company: Phoenix Pictures
- Distributed by: Alcon Entertainment and Warner Bros. Pictures (North America and select international territories); Fox International Productions 20th Century Fox (Latin America); Good Universe (International)
- Release dates: August 6, 2015 (Chile); August 20, 2015 (Colombia); November 13, 2015 (United States); January 22, 2016 (Spain)
- Running time: 127 minutes
- Countries: United States; Colombia; Spain; Chile
- Languages: English; Spanish
- Budget: $26 million
- Box office: $28 million

The 33 (Spanish: Los 33; "Los treinta y tres") is a 2015 biographical disaster-survival drama film directed by Patricia Riggen and written by Mikko Alanne, Craig Borten, Michael Thomas, and José Rivera. The film is based on the real events of the 2010 Copiapó mining disaster, in which 33 miners were trapped inside the San José Mine in Chile for 69 days. The film stars Antonio Banderas as trapped miner Mario Sepúlveda.

It was released in Chile on August 6, 2015, by 20th Century Fox and in the United States on November 13, 2015, by Warner Bros. Pictures and Alcon Entertainment.

== Plot ==
In August 2010, a group of 33 miners from Copiapó, Chile, work in the San José Mine when the mine collapses due to the owner's negligence in ignoring warning signs of instability. The collapse blocks the only path into the mine, leaving the miners trapped. They manage to make their way to a rescue chamber, but soon realize they are ill-prepared for a long stay. The radio is not working, the medical kit is empty, and there is very little food. Mario Sepúlveda emerges as a leader among the miners, taking charge of rationing food and keeping the group from spiraling into violence and despair. The mine company does not attempt to rescue the miners, and their families gather outside the gates of the mine.

The Chilean government intervenes and orders the use of drilling to reach the trapped miners. The first few boreholes miss their target, but eventually, a successful one reaches the rescue chamber. The miners attach a note to the drill bit to let the surface know they are alive. The government sends in food, clothing, and establishes television communication with the surface. A second drilling system is prepared to retrieve the miners one by one.

Over the next several weeks, the rescuers work to free the miners. After more than two months of being trapped, all 33 miners are successfully rescued.

== Cast ==
- Antonio Banderas as Mario Sepúlveda, public face for the group of miners, who made daily video logs to assure the public that they were all right.
- Rodrigo Santoro as Laurence Golborne, the Minister of Mining of Chile.
- Juliette Binoche as María Segovia, Darío's sister.
- James Brolin as Jeff Hart, a driller who supervises the drilling operation to save the miners.
- Lou Diamond Phillips as Luis "Don Lucho" Urzúa, the shift foreman, who took a leading role while the miners were trapped and helped make more accurate maps of the cave for the rescue crews.
- Mario Casas as Álex Vega, a miner who suffered from kidney problems and hypertension.
- Gabriel Byrne as André Sougarret, the mining engineer who masterminded the escape operation.
- Bob Gunton as Sebastián Piñera, President of Chile.
- Paulina García as Isabel Pereira, assistant to president Piñera.
- Adriana Barraza as Marta Salinas.
- Kate del Castillo as Katy Valdivia de Sepúlveda.
- Cote de Pablo as Jessica Vega, the wife of Álex Vega.
- Juan Pablo Raba as Darío Segovia, drill operator and son of a miner.
- Jacob Vargas as Edison "Elvis" Peña, the miners' song leader, who requested that Elvis Presley songs be sent down the mine.
- Naomi Scott as Escarlette Sepúlveda Valdivia, Mario and Katy's daughter.
- Marco Treviño as José Henríquez, the miners' pastor, who led daily prayers within the shelter.
- Oscar Nunez as Yonni Barrios.
- Alejandro Goic as Franklin Lobos.
- Cristián Campos as Hurtado, a drill expert engineer
- Tim Willcox as himself.
- Federico Luppi
- Tenoch Huerta as Carlos Mamani, a Bolivian miner who moved to Chile a decade prior to the events.
- Pedro Calvo
- Macarena Pizarro as herself, news announcer
- Mario Kreutzberger (Don Francisco) as himself.
- Leonardo Farkas as himself.
- Gustavo Angarita as Mario Gómez.

== Production ==
=== Development ===
The film is based on the events of the 2010 Copiapó mining accident, also known as the "Chilean mining accident". It is directed by Patricia Riggen and written by Mikko Alanne and José Rivera. Producer Mike Medavoy, who also produced Apocalypse Now, worked with the miners, their families, and those involved to put the film together. On 13 August 2014, it was announced that The 33 would be the first film to receive the Colombian Film Commission's incentive, which includes 40% for film services and 20% for film logistics services of the amount spent in the country.

=== Casting ===
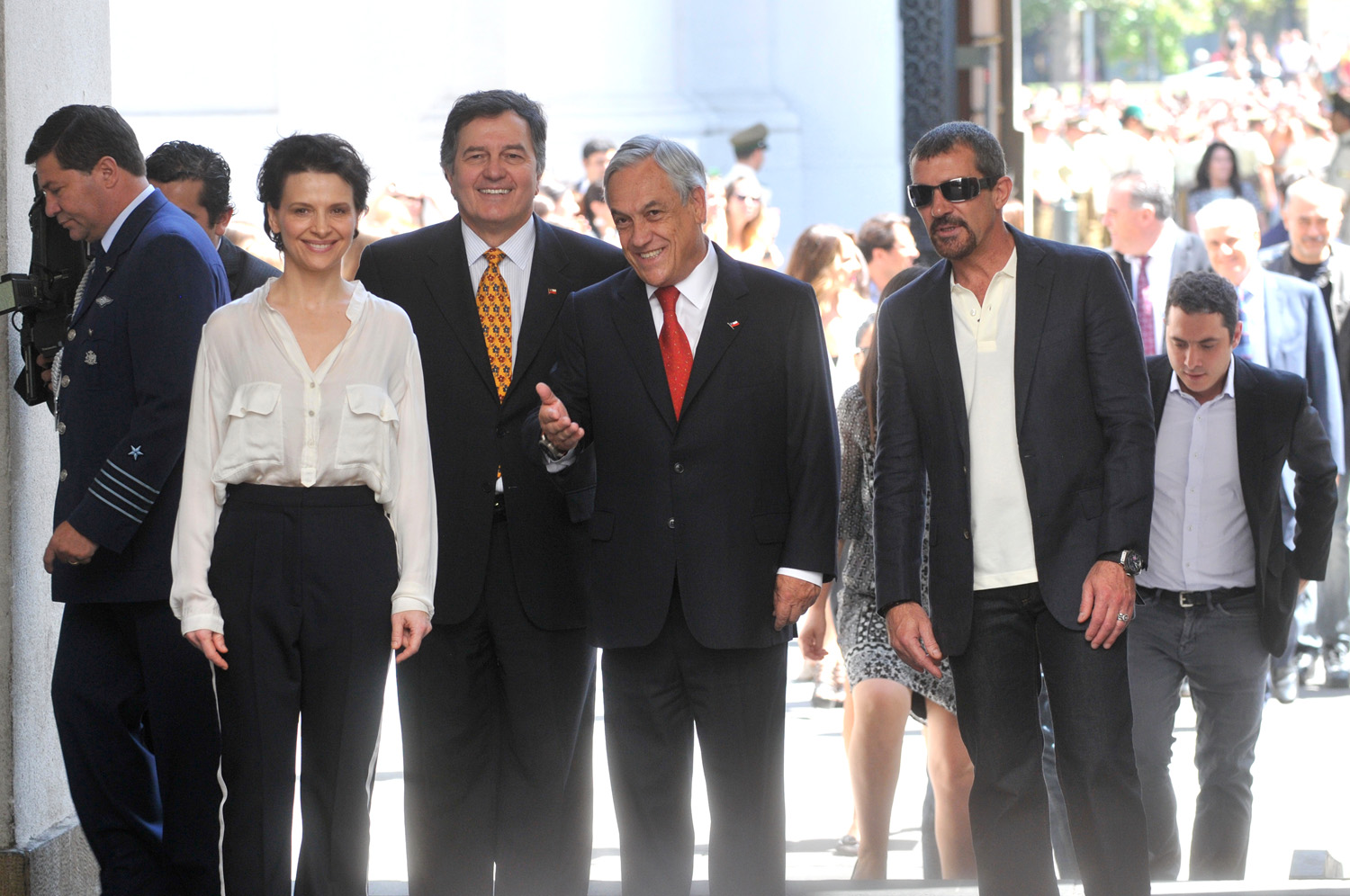
Juliette Binoche and Antonio Banderas with the former President of Chile Sebastián Piñera in La Moneda Palace, Santiago, Chile

Antonio Banderas, who portrays "Super" Mario Sepúlveda, is the public face for the miners who sent videos to the rescuers to update them on the miners' condition. The actual Sepúlveda expressed his enthusiasm and approval towards having Banderas in the role. Brazilian actor Rodrigo Santoro plays Laurence Golborne, Minister of Mining. On 17 June 2013, it was announced that Jennifer Lopez had joined to lead the cast of the film, but later left due to scheduling conflicts with American Idol. She was replaced by Juliette Binoche.

On 10 January 2014, Cote de Pablo joined the cast of the film; she plays the wife of one of the trapped miners. On 27 January 2014, Gabriel Byrne joined the cast of the film, to play the role of Andre Sougarret, the engineering genius who masterminded the miraculous rescue of the 33 trapped miners. Next day on 28 January, Bob Gunton joined the cast of the Chilean miner filming, then shooting in Colombia; he plays the role of Chilean President Sebastián Piñera.

=== Filming ===
Principal photography began in December 2013 in Colombia. Before shooting began, Riggen interviewed each of the miners and their families. After the shooting wrapped up in Nemocón, Colombia in January, crews started filming again in Copiapó, Chile on 5 February 2014, which was the actual place of the incident. On 18 February 2014, news told that more than half of the filming was done in the salt mine of Nemocón, Colombia, and rescue scenes were being filmed in Tierra Amarilla, Chile. Filming wrapped up on 20 February 2014.

=== Music ===
In October 2014, James Horner was hired to compose the music for the film. It was the second of two scores he had completed in 2015, before his death on 22 June of that year.

== Release ==
The 33 was released across Latin America through 20th Century Fox starting from 6 August 2015 in Chile. It debuted in Colombia on 20 August 2015, along with the rest of Central America. Brazil was the last, where the film was released on 29 October 2015. Its United States and Canada theatrical releases were handled by Warner Bros. Pictures on 13 November 2015. The premiere in Santiago was attended by most of the leading cast, in addition to several of the miners, former President Sebastián Piñera and former minister Laurence Golborne.

=== Home media ===
The 33 was released on DVD and Blu-ray on February 16, 2016.

=== Distribution ===
On 28 April 2015, Warner Bros. Pictures and Alcon Entertainment acquired North American and the majority of international distribution rights to the film, while Good Universe retained it in some international territories. On the same day, Warner Bros, where Alcon has its output deal, set the film's American release date for 13 November 2015.

== Reception ==
=== Box office ===
According to Box Office Mojo, The 33 grossed $12.2 million in North America and $12.7 million in other territories for a worldwide total of $24.9 million, against its production budget of $26 million. The data is inaccurate though since Box Office Mojo e.g. for the UK and Germany only has data for the first weekend and data for France is missing completely even though the film has been released in the country.

In North America, The 33 opened alongside Love the Coopers and My All American on 13 November 2015 with a very poor performance. In its opening weekend, the film was projected to gross $7–8 million from 2,452 theaters. The film grossed $1.8 million on its opening day and $5.8 million in its opening weekend, finishing below studio projections.

In Chile, the film grossed $1.6 million on its opening weekend, 6 August 2015, showing on 140 screens. This is the second biggest opening for a Chilean film (5% behind Stefan v/s Kramer), despite coinciding with a severe storm that caused flooding in Santiago and other parts of the country and also marked the sixth-highest opening for Fox International Productions. It topped the box office there for five consecutive weekends and became the second highest-grossing Chilean film. The film grossed a total of $4.9 million in Chile.

In Mexico, it opened at No. 3 with $1.3 million, but ended up grossing only a total of $3 million there after three weeks in release.

=== Critical response ===
On the review aggregator website Rotten Tomatoes, 48% of 156 critics' reviews are positive. The website's consensus reads: "The 33 offers an appropriately inspirational account of real-life heroism, but its stirring story and solid performances are undermined by a flawed focus and an overreliance on formula." Metacritic, which uses a weighted average, assigned the film a score of 55 out of 100, based on 31 critics, indicating "mixed or average" reviews. On CinemaScore, audiences gave the film an average grade of "A−" on an A+ to F scale.

Scott Tobias of Variety said, "The 33 aims for a comprehensive survey of efforts above ground and below, but winds up looking less like a sober docudrama than a ginned-up Irwin Allen disaster movie."

Chilean critics had mixed reviews. Ana Josefa Silva gave a mildly positive review, saying that the movie "excites and entertains", but that the good rhythm of the first half becomes stalled. She praised the acting, but criticized the use of many clichés, like the heroic young character (Golborne), the "inhumane" politician (Piñera) or the brave, "badass" Latina woman (Segovia). Las Últimas Noticias stated that "while the epic of the rescue is observed thanks to the effective recreation, the agony of the rescued remains in debt in the staging", and also noted the "young and handsome" hero stereotype. La Segunda described it as "a catastrophe film with a life message and sentimental vocation that is not willing to give up to truisms associated with the image that Hollywood has of Hispanic America". El Mercurio gave a negative review, criticizing the absence of people responsible for the precarious working conditions of the miners, although praising the recreation of the mine and the catastrophe.

== Accuracy ==
Among the differences between the film and the real life story, Alex Vega was not the first man to be rescued, but Florencio Ávalos. Also, Vega's wife was not pregnant at the time. In the film, the Fénix capsule arrives empty at the rescue chamber, but actually there was a rescuer inside of it. The capsule did not get stuck with a miner inside; André Sougarret did not order the end of the rescue works before the contact with the miners; and María Segovia never slapped Laurence Golborne in the face.

== Accolades ==
The film was awarded the prize for Best Movie for Mature Audiences at the 2016 MovieGuide Awards.

== See also ==
- Survival film
