= G20 (film) =

2025 film by Patricia Riggen

- Release poster
- Directed by: Patricia Riggen
- Screenplay by: Caitlin Parrish; Erica Weiss; Logan Miller; Noah Miller
- Story by: Logan Miller; Noah Miller
- Produced by: Andrew Lazar; Viola Davis; Julius Tennon
- Starring: Viola Davis; Anthony Anderson; Marsai Martin; Ramón Rodríguez; Douglas Hodge; Elizabeth Marvel; Sabrina Impacciatore; Clark Gregg; Antony Starr
- Cinematography: Checco Varese
- Edited by: Emma E. Hickox; Doc Crotzer
- Music by: Joseph Trapanese
- Production companies: MRC; Mad Chance; JuVee
- Distributed by: Amazon MGM Studios
- Release date: April 10, 2025
- Running time: 108 minutes
- Country: United States
- Language: English

G20 is a 2025 American action thriller film directed by Patricia Riggen and written by Caitlin Parrish, Erica Weiss, and Logan and Noah Miller. The film stars Viola Davis, who also produces the film, as the US president who must use her military skills to fight off terrorists who have taken over a G20 conference venue, with Anthony Anderson, Marsai Martin, Ramón Rodríguez, Douglas Hodge, Elizabeth Marvel, Sabrina Impacciatore, Clark Gregg, and Antony Starr.

G20 was released worldwide by Amazon MGM Studios via Prime Video on April 10, 2025. The film received generally mixed reviews from critics.

== Plot ==
In Budapest, former Australian Special Forces Corporal Edward Rutledge and his mercenaries acquire a $70 million cryptocurrency wallet by chasing a woman down the streets and finally drugging her into a coma in a nearby pub. Meanwhile, US President and Army veteran Danielle Sutton is publicly embarrassed by the rebellious antics of her daughter Serena, who sneaks out of the White House to go partying, leading Sutton and her husband, First Gentleman Derek, to bring Serena and her brother Demetrius with them to the G20 summit of world leaders in South Africa.

Arriving for the summit at a heavily fortified hotel in Cape Town, Sutton and Treasury Secretary Joanna Worth present their plan to empower struggling sub-Saharan farmers through access to digital currency. Infiltrating the summit, Rutledge and his men ambush the guests' security details, including Sutton's own Secret Service Counter Assault Team, and seize control of the hotel. As the members of the summit are taken hostage, Sutton and Secret Service Agent Manny Ruiz slip away with UK Prime Minister Oliver Everett, head of the International Monetary Fund Elena Romano, and First Lady of South Korea Han Minh-Seo, while Derek rescues his children and evades capture.

Broadcasting his actions to the world, Rutledge accuses Sutton and her fellow leaders of corruption and urges citizens around the globe to place all their money in cryptocurrency, outside of governmental control. He uses the hostages' voices and likenesses to create deepfake videos supporting his claims, leaking the doctored footage to the press, and the surge in crypto investment sends the value of his own wallet soaring. On the roof, Serena manages to send a message to Vice President Harold Mosely, but turncoat Secret Service Agent Darden captures Derek.

Fighting off mercenaries, which include Suidlanders, Sutton and a wounded Ruiz guide the others to "the Beast", the presidential armored limo. Rutledge executes the Prime Minister of Australia and the President of South Korea before beating Derek over the radio, forcing Sutton to reveal her location. Darden finds her but is killed by Ruiz, and Serena and Demetrius are saved by Melokuhle and Lesedi, South African government agents posing as hotel staff. Han rejoins the hostages and finds her husband's body, while Romano and Everett drive the Beast through the hotel perimeter and Lesedi destroys the mercenaries' missiles.

Everett informs Mosely of Sutton's plan to save the hostages, and Ruiz cuts the hotel's power as Melokuhle and Lesedi take over the mercenaries' surveillance feed. Killing more of Rutledge's men, Sutton surrenders herself to save her husband and Worth, allowing Rutledge to manipulate her image in a final deepfake that crashes the American economy and gains him $150 billion. Accusing Sutton – who rose to prominence after a heroic photo while serving in Iraq – of profiting off the deaths of his brothers-in-arms, Rutledge shoots Derek. Stabbed by Han, Rutledge drops the wallet and flees, and a strike team rescues the hostages.

Derek is saved by his bulletproof vest, and Sutton realizes Worth is in league with Rutledge, who takes Serena at gunpoint to escape by helicopter. Sutton confronts him with the wallet, the only means of accessing the money, which is knocked into the forest below. Before he can shoot Serena, Sutton tackles Rutledge out of the helicopter to his death, and the strike team pulls the helicopter to safety. In the aftermath, Worth is incarcerated, Ruiz recovers, and President Sutton's plan is successfully adopted by the G20, as she and her family return home to the White House.

== Cast ==
- Viola Davis as Danielle Sutton, the President of the United States
- Anthony Anderson as Derek Sutton, the First Gentleman and Danielle's husband
- Marsai Martin as Serena Sutton, Danielle and Derek's daughter
- Ramón Rodríguez as Manny Ruiz, President Sutton's primary United States Secret Service bodyguard
- Antony Starr as Edward Rutledge, a former Australian Special Forces soldier and PAX Security operative
- Douglas Hodge as Oliver Everett, the UK Prime Minister
- Elizabeth Marvel as Joanna Worth, the US Secretary of the Treasury
- Christopher Farrar as Demetrius Sutton, Danielle and Derek's son
- Sabrina Impacciatore as Elena Romano, the head of the International Monetary Fund
- MeeWha Alana Lee as Han Min-Seo, the First Lady of South Korea
- John Hoogenakker as Darden, a US Secret Service agent in league with Rutledge
- Gideon Emery as Warren Paxton, the sole PAX Security operative unaligned with Rutledge
- Conrad Kemp as Bousquet, a PAX Security operative
- Joseph Steven Yang as Lee Young-Ho, the President of South Korea
- Emmanuel Castis as Titos, a PAX Security operative
- David James as Csonger, a PAX Security operative
- Clark Gregg as Harold Mosely, the US Vice President
- Julius Tennon as Mikkelson, the Director of the CIA
- Ali Suliman as Adwi, a SAPS Special Task Force operative
- Angela Sarafyan as Quoll, a cryptocurrency broker
- Colin Moss as Lowe, the Prime Minister of Australia

== Production ==
It was announced in November 2022 that Viola Davis was set to star in and produce the film, with Patricia Riggen set to direct. Production was impacted in July 2023 as a result of the 2023 SAG-AFTRA strike. The film had been granted an interim agreement though the production was not set to commence filming despite this, and Davis announcing the following day she would not film until the conclusion of the strike.

Principal photography officially began in January 2024 in Cape Town, with Anthony Anderson, Marsai Martin, Ramón Rodríguez, Antony Starr, Douglas Hodge, Elizabeth Marvel, Sabrina Impacciatore and Clark Gregg among the cast announced to be joining. Filming wrapped by early March.

== Release ==
G20 was released in 240 territories globally on Amazon Prime Video on April 10, 2025.

== Reception ==
=== Critical response ===
On the review aggregator website Rotten Tomatoes, 55% of 75 critics' reviews are positive, with an average rating of 5.2/10. The website's consensus reads: "Too straight-faced to have as much fun with its juicy premise as it could, G20 is more pedestrian than presidential but does have a commanding lead in Viola Davis." Metacritic, which uses a weighted average, assigned the film a score of 52 out of 100, based on 18 critics, indicating "mixed or average" reviews.

Robert Daniels of RogerEbert.com gave the film two and a half stars out of four and wrote, "Harrison Ford's films succeeded because Ford portrayed himself as a symbol that could be bent or complicated by showing, not telling. This is why a film like Air Force One, admittedly a rah-rah post-Cold War film, has far more to say about America's unconscious vulnerability as a world power than G20 about the war in the Middle East or America as an imperialist force. Still, the film's thunderous intentions don't wholly distract from its more exhilarating sequences."

=== Accolades ===
Award	Date of ceremony	Category	Recipient(s)	Result	Ref.
Astra TV Awards	June 10, 2025	Best Television Movie	G20	Nominated	
Astra TV Awards	June 10, 2025	Best Cast Ensemble in a Limited Series or TV Movie	G20	Nominated	
Black Reel TV Awards	August 18, 2025	Outstanding Lead Performance in a TV Movie/Limited Series	Viola Davis	Nominated	
Critics' Choice Super Awards	August 7, 2025	Best Actress in an Action Series, Limited Series or Made-for-TV Movie	Viola Davis	Nominated	
NAACP Image Awards	February 28, 2026	Outstanding Television Movie, Mini-Series or Special	G20	Nominated	
NAACP Image Awards	February 28, 2026	Outstanding Actress in a Television Movie, Mini-Series or Special	Viola Davis	Nominated	
NAACP Image Awards	February 28, 2026	Outstanding Supporting Actress in a Television Movie, Limited-Series or Special	Marsai Martin	Nominated	
NAACP Image Awards	February 28, 2026	Outstanding Stunt Ensemble (TV or Film)	Grant Powell	Nominated	
