= Ligiah Villalobos =

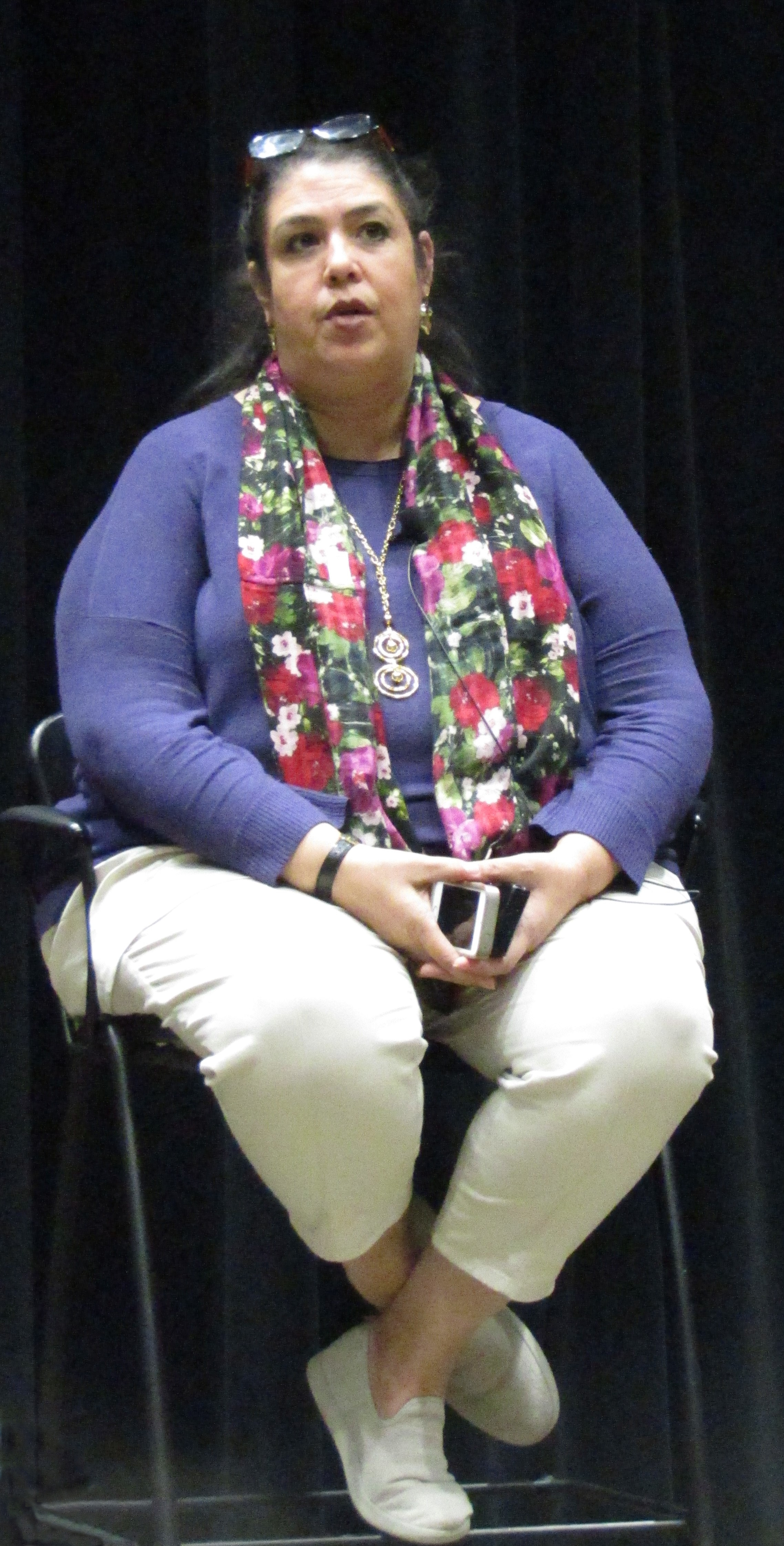
- Born: Chihuahua, Mexico
- Occupations: Writer; Producer

Ligiah Villalobos is a Mexican-American television writer and producer. She is best known for her work as head writer for the Nick Jr. show Go, Diego, Go as well as producing and writing the Sundance film Under the Same Moon.

== Early life and education ==
Ligiah Villalobos was born to Efrain Villalobos and Olivia Rojas, in Chihuahua, Mexico, and raised in Mexico City. She moved to the United States at the age of eleven.

She graduated with a Bachelor of Arts in creative writing from Antioch University in September 2013 and also received a Master of Fine Arts in creative writing from the same institution in May 2016. Ligiah also studied at Brigham Young University for four years.

== Career ==
Villalobos has produced many films and TV shows. Her most notable works include Under the Same Moon, Go, Diego, Go!, and Ed.

She has developed projects for multiple studios and networks, including NBC, the ABC Family Channel, FX, Showtime, BET, and HBO. Villalobos consulted on the films Planes and Coco, as well as the television series Nina's World. She was a studio executive at The Walt Disney Company, where she oversaw all television production in Latin America for five years. Here, she launched eight children's shows and oversaw the Writing Fellowship Program and the Director's Training Program for a year. At The Warner Bros. TV Network, Villalobos served as a Current Programming Executive, where she oversaw six prime-time shows.

She also wrote the pilot for the NBC television series Loteria, a pilot for Starz based on the book The Dirty Girls Social Club, and an animated feature film called Chito and the Land of Xo.

In 2012, Villalobos wrote the film Firelight. She also co-wrote the Lifetime TV film The Real MVP (2016), which was produced by Queen Latifah and Shelby Stone.

Ligiah has been on the board of the Writers Guild Foundation and the National Hispanic Media Coalition.

=== Under the Same Moon ===
As its Writer and Executive Producer, Under the Same Moon is regarded as Villalobos's best-known work. This film was an "Official Selection at the 2007 Sundance Film Festival and became the highest-selling Spanish-language film in the history of Sundance". She originally wrote the film 7 years prior to its production because she wanted to make the career transition from producer to writer. As a child immigrant from Mexico herself, Ligiah did not want to create another "crossing the border story" but one "about the displacement of children as a result of parents coming to live in this country". She wanted to focus on the abandonment of children, a theme that resonated in her own childhood due to the divorce of her parents.

Before the film went into production, Villalobos had to repurchase the rights to it from the original producers, since her script had been with them for five years. After struggling with two production companies, the team for this movie decided to make it an independent film and raised the necessary funds within a month. After getting into Sundance, the film sold for five million dollars.

== Awards ==
She won a Humanitas Prize in 2013.
