= Eva Mendes =

American actress (born 1974)

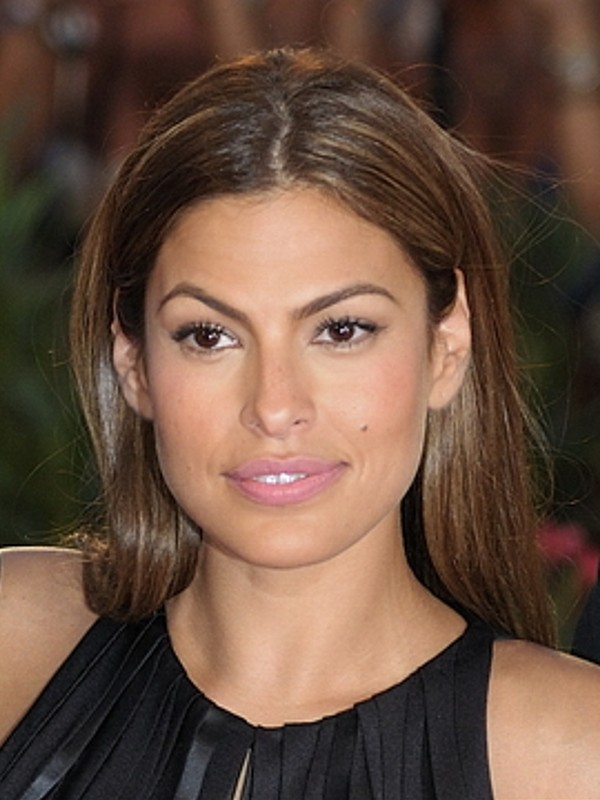
- Mendes in 2009
- Born: Eva de la Caridad Méndez; March 5, 1974 (age 52); Miami, Florida, U.S.
- Occupation: Actress
- Years active: 1996–2014; 2021; 2026
- Spouse: Ryan Gosling (2011–present)
- Children: 2

Eva de la Caridad Méndez (/ˈmɛndɛz/, (Latin American Spanish: [ˈeβa ðe la kaɾiˈðað ˈmendes]; born March 5, 1974), known professionally as Eva Mendes, is an American former actress. Her acting career began in the late 1990s with a series of roles in films such as Children of the Corn V: Fields of Terror (1998) and Urban Legends: Final Cut (2000).

Mendes's performance in Training Day (2001) marked a turning point in her career and led to parts in the commercially successful films All About The Benjamins (2002) and 2 Fast 2 Furious (2003) and Hitch (2005). She starred in Ghost Rider (2007) and The Spirit (2008), both film adaptations of comics, and ventured into more dramatic territory with We Own the Night (2007), Bad Lieutenant: Port of Call New Orleans (2009), Last Night (2010), and The Place Beyond the Pines (2012). Her other films include Out of Time (2003), The Women (2008), The Other Guys (2010), and Girl in Progress (2012).

Mendes has appeared in several music videos for artists such as Will Smith and has also been an ambassador for brands including Calvin Klein, Cartier, Reebok, Pantene shampoo, Morgan and Peek & Cloppenburg. She has designed for New York & Company and was the creative director of CIRCA Beauty, a makeup line sold at Walgreens.

== Early life ==
Mendes was born on March 5, 1974, in Miami, to Cuban parents Eva Pérez Suárez and Carlos Méndez and was raised by her mother in the Los Angeles neighborhood of Silver Lake after her parents' divorce. Her mother worked at Mann's Chinese Theatre and later for an aerospace company, and her father ran a meat distribution business. Mendes had an older brother Juan Carlos Méndez (1963–2016), who died from throat cancer, and a younger half brother, Carlo (born 1978). She attended Hoover High School in Glendale and later studied marketing at California State University, Northridge, but left college to pursue acting under Ivana Chubbuck.

== Acting career ==
=== Beginnings and breakthrough (1998–2001) ===
Mendes started her acting career after a talent manager saw her photograph in a friend's portfolio. Her first film role was as part of a group of young people who become lost in middle America in the direct-to-video horror film Children of the Corn V: Fields of Terror. Mendes was disappointed in her performance and soon hired an acting coach. She subsequently took on the roles of a bridesmaid in the comedy A Night at the Roxbury (1998) with Will Ferrell and Chris Kattan, a housekeeper in the fantasy family film My Brother the Pig (1999) with Scarlett Johansson, and an ill-fated film student in the slasher film Urban Legends: Final Cut (2000). She was considered for a role in the film Piñero (2001) by director Leon Ichaso but did not get the part.

Mendes appeared in the Steven Seagal action thriller Exit Wounds (2001), which made over US$73 million worldwide. According to Mendes, her voice was dubbed in the editing after a producer told her she "didn't sound intelligent enough". Her breakthrough came later in 2001 with her performance as the mistress of a corrupt cop in Antoine Fuqua's crime thriller Training Day alongside Denzel Washington and Ethan Hawke. She described her role as pivotal in her career, motivating her to keep going as an actress after she had become bored doing "terrible, cheesy horrible films." Training Day was a box office hit, grossing US$104.5 million.

=== Worldwide exposure (2002–2009) ===
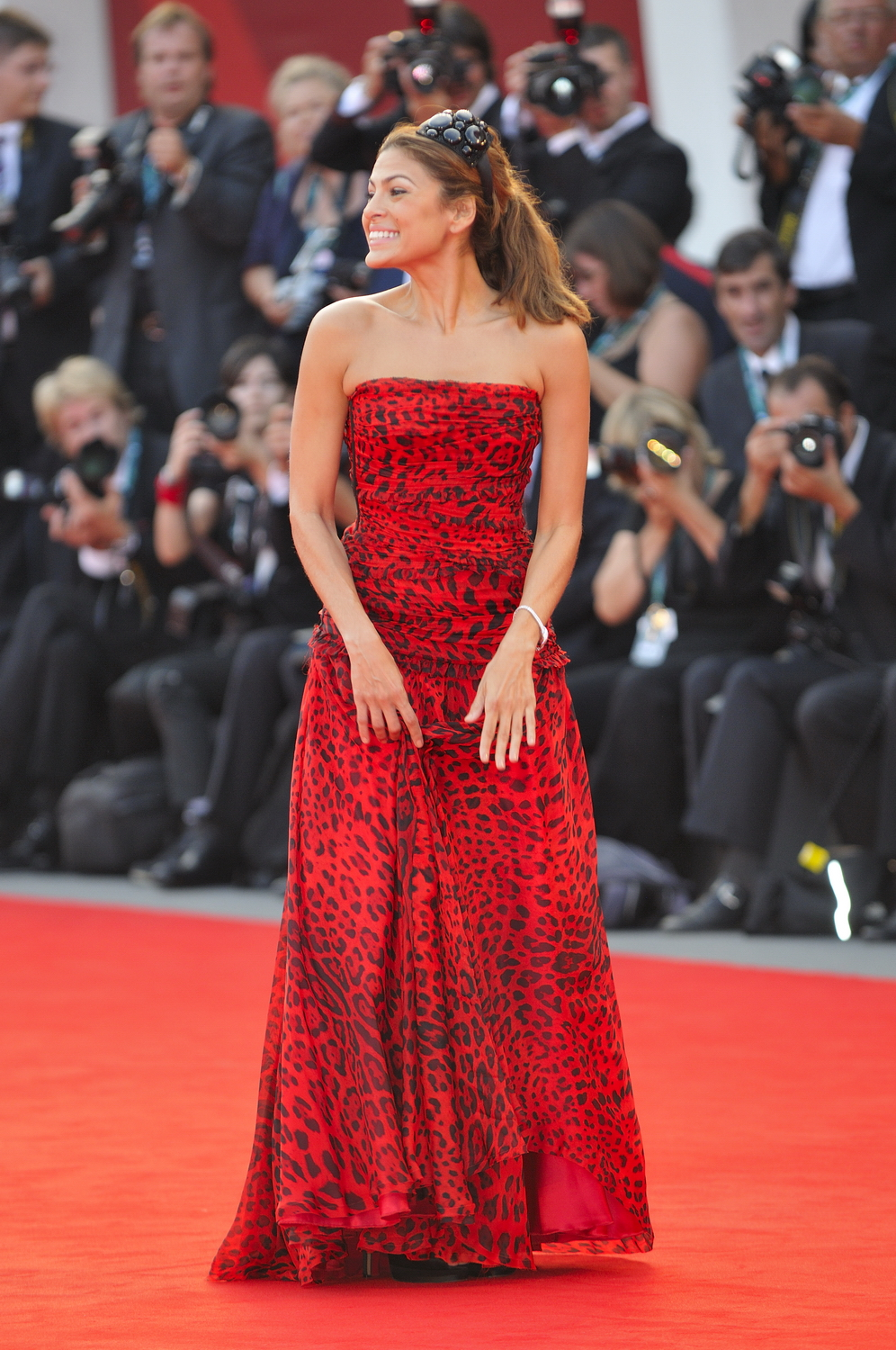
Mendes at the 66th Venice Film Festival

Her role in Training Day led to larger film parts and Mendes soon established herself as a Hollywood actress. While her sole film release in 2002 was the crime comedy All About the Benjamins, in which she played the girlfriend of a con artist, Mendes had roles in four studio feature films released throughout 2003. 2 Fast 2 Furious teamed her with Paul Walker and Tyrese Gibson while portraying a United States Customs Service agent working undercover for a notorious Argentine drug lord. The film gave Mendes much wider exposure, grossing over US$236 million globally. The Western action film Once Upon a Time in Mexico saw her star as the daughter of a Mexican drug lord, alongside Antonio Banderas and Salma Hayek. While reviews for the film were mixed, it made US$98.1 million.

Mendes reunited with Denzel Washington for the thriller Out of Time, in which she played the soon-to-be ex-wife of a well-respected chief of police. The film was a moderate commercial success, and Roger Ebert, in his review for the film, described Mendes' role as a "curiously forgiving character, who feels little rancor for the straying [husband] and apparently still likes him; maybe there would have been more suspense if she were furious with him". Her last 2003 film was the comedy Stuck on You, with Matt Damon and Greg Kinnear, in which she played an aspiring actress.

She starred as the love interest of a professional dating consultant (Will Smith), in her next film, Hitch (2005), USA Today described it as "her best screen role to date", and Detroit Free Press remarked: "Smith and Mendes are terrific together. He brings her game up so high you'd think she has had as many good parts as Smith." Hitch made US$368.1 million in its global theatrical run. In 2005, Mendes also starred in the little-seen films The Wendell Baker Story and Guilty Hearts.

In the romantic comedy Trust the Man (2006), Mendes starred with David Duchovny, Billy Crudup, Julianne Moore, and Maggie Gyllenhaal, playing what The A.V. Club described as a "vapid sexpot". The much criticized Ghost Rider (2007), based on the Marvel Comics character, featured Mendes as the love interest of the titular character (Nicolas Cage). The film fared well commercially, opening atop at the North American box office, with earnings of more than US$45 million; it eventually made over US$228 million worldwide. She starred opposite Joaquin Phoenix and Mark Wahlberg in the thriller We Own the Night (also 2007), as the girlfriend of an NYPD captain's brother. Critic Peter Travers found the film to be "defiantly, refreshingly unhip" and noted that "sizzle comes naturally" from Mendes. In 2007, she also starred in the films Live! and Cleaner, both of which went unnoticed by audiences, and made an uncredited cameo appearance in the comedy Knocked Up.

In 2008, Mendes took on the role of a perfume salesgirl in Saks Fifth Avenue in the all-female comedy The Women, opposite Meg Ryan, Annette Bening, Debra Messing, and Jada Pinkett Smith. Though a commercial success, The Women was panned by critics, with Mendes earning a nomination for the Golden Raspberry Award for Worst Actress for her performance. She also played the femme fatale Sand Saref in 2008's The Spirit, based on the newspaper comic strip of the same name by Will Eisner. It received lackluster reviews from critics, who deemed it melodramatic, unoriginal, and sexist. Her only 2009 film release was the crime drama Bad Lieutenant: Port of Call New Orleans, which reunited her with Nicolas Cage, playing a prostitute, and again, his love interest. While the film found a limited audience in theaters, it garnered acclaim, appearing on many top ten lists of the year.

=== Further roles and retirement (2010–2014) ===
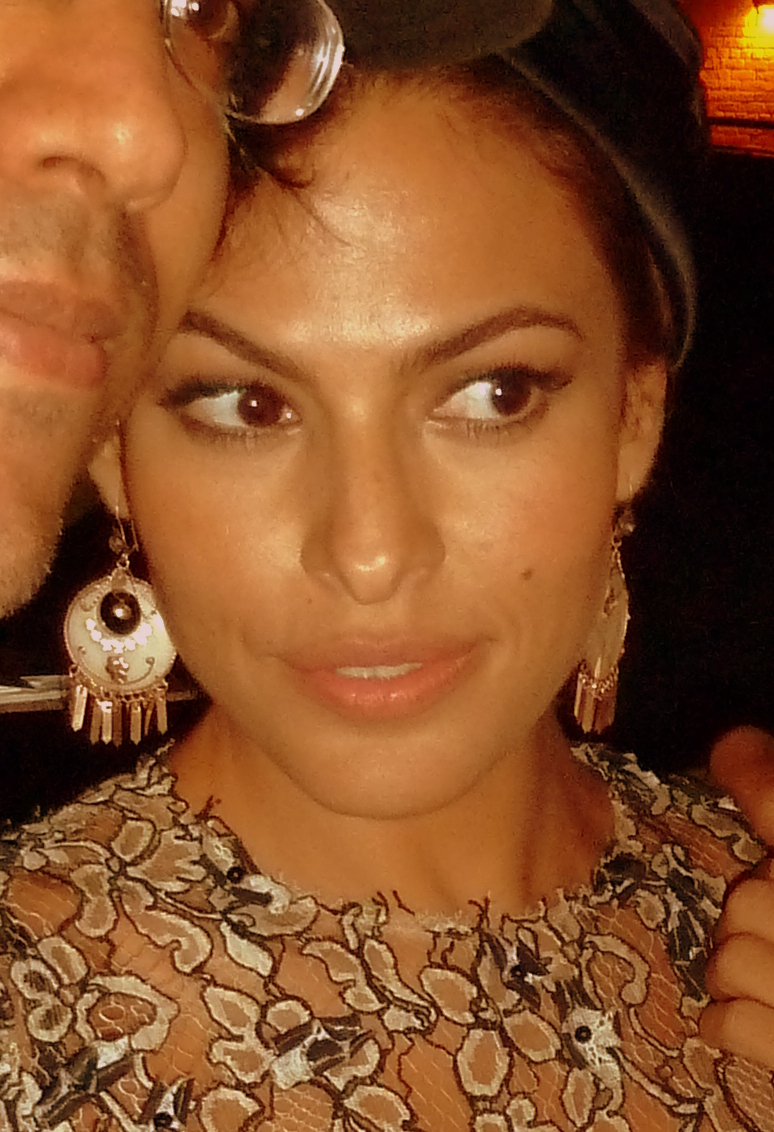
Mendes at the 2012 TIFF premiere of The Place Beyond the Pines

Mendes reunited with previous collaborators Will Ferrell and Mark Wahlberg for the action comedy The Other Guys (2010), in which she portrayed the wife of a mild-mannered forensic NYPD accountant (Ferrell). It was a commercial success, grossing US$170.4 million globally. In 2010, she also played the co-worker and the love interest of a committed man in Massy Tadjedin's romantic drama Last Night, alongside Keira Knightley and Sam Worthington. While she was initially reluctant to star, worrying that the character would "lack originality" and was "too seductive", she agreed to play the role after meeting with Tadjedin; she said: "It was great to connect with a female director and talk about this woman and not objectify her as the other woman but give her a real true life and make her honest ... Thank God I did."

In 2011, Mendes appeared in an uncredited cameo in Fast Five, reprising her role from 2 Fast 2 Furious. In 2012, she starred in the dramedy Girl in Progress, as a single mom raising her fourteen-year-old daughter, and in the art fantasy drama Holy Motors, as Kay M, a role originally written for Kate Moss. While Girl in Progress earned Mendes an ALMA Award nomination for Favorite Movie Actress, she described Holy Motors as "the coolest, most creative thing I've ever done".

In The Place Beyond the Pines (also 2012), a drama directed by Derek Cianfrance and alongside Ryan Gosling and Bradley Cooper, Mendes portrayed the former lover of a motorcycle stuntman. The film was a moderate commercial success, and Entertainment Weekly, in its review, described her performance as "quietly heartbreaking". She also visited Sierra Leone and was featured in the PBS documentary Half the Sky: Turning Oppression into Opportunity for Women Worldwide, which aired in October 2012.

In 2013, Mendes appeared in the HBO comedy film Clear History as a formerly heavy-set woman, and in 2014, she starred as a cabaret show performer in Ryan Gosling's directorial debut Lost River, which competed in the Un Certain Regard section at the Cannes Film Festival. Thereafter, she retired from the film industry. Speaking of her retirement in 2022, Mendes said:

I got tired fighting for the good roles. There just was a point where I thought, 'I'm going to create my own opportunities and become a producer on things and create my own material,' but it just didn't feel worth it to me. There are more opportunities for Latina actresses now (in 2022), but when I bowed out 10 years ago I wasn't being offered things that weren't specifically Latina. It is exciting that things are different now, so who knows what I will do in the future. But right now, I'm keeping it in the home with my kids.

== Other endeavors ==
=== Modeling ===
Mendes appeared in the Pet Shop Boys' music video for "Se a vida é (That's the Way Life Is)" in 1996, Aerosmith's music video for "Hole in My Soul" in 1997, and Will Smith's music video for "Miami" in 1998. She also appeared in the music video for The Strokes' "The End Has No End" in 2004.

In 2005, Mendes was employed by Revlon as an international spokesperson, and participated in their campaign to raise funds for breast cancer research. In December 2007, People for the Ethical Treatment of Animals (PETA) used a nude photo of Mendes for their anti-fur campaign. Mendes was a spokesmodel for the 2008 Campari calendar. She also appeared nude in a 2008 print advertisement for Calvin Klein's Secret Obsession perfume, an ad that United States network executives found too risqué for broadcasting.

Mendes has been a spokesperson for Calvin Klein, Magnum, and the chocolate milk brand Cocio. She also promoted Thierry Mugler's Angel fragrance, Reebok shoes, and Pantene shampoo. In 2011, Mendes appeared in a Peek & Cloppenburg clothing catalog.

=== Homegoods ===
Mendes had a line of bed linens and dinnerware that was sold at Macy's. In February 2013, she partnered with New York & Co. to launch her own fashion line, Eva by Eva Mendes. She was also the creative director of the makeup brand CIRCA Beauty, which launched exclusively at Walgreens in 2015.

=== Singing ===
In 2010, Mendes sang "Pimps Don't Cry", a song featured in The Other Guys, and also performed a duet with CeeLo Green with the same song. In 2011, she recorded a version of "The Windmills of Your Mind". She also featured in the single "Miami" sung by Will Smith which was released in 1998.

== Public image ==
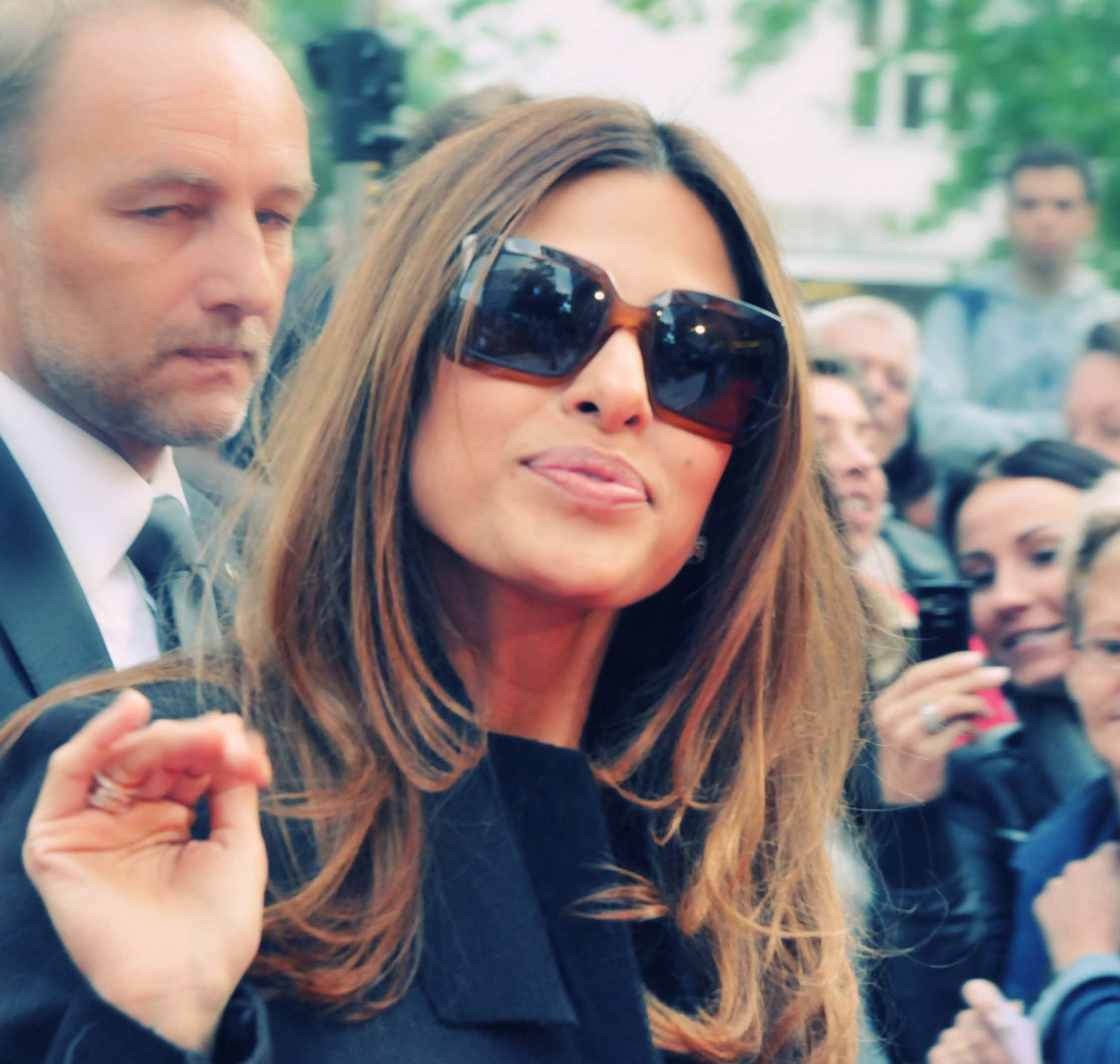
Mendes in 2011

Many media outlets have cited her as one of the world's most beautiful Latin women, and she has been often considered a sex symbol. She once embraced that status, saying it was "partially self-created ... I think at times I play up my sexiness. And there's times where I don't", though she does not let it interfere with her film work: "I like it when it doesn't limit my career. It's a part of my life, but on a secondary plane". Nevertheless, her professional trajectory throughout the 2000s tended to gravitate towards parts that relied heavily on her looks. She has not appeared in a film since 2014.

Mendes ranked 54th, 12th, 7th, 7th, and 11th in Maxim magazine's Hot 100 issue in 2002, 2005, 2007, 2008, and 2010 respectively, and appeared several times on the cover. She also ranked 80th, 23rd and 44th in FHM magazine's "100 Sexiest Women in the World" supplement in 2004, 2005, 2006. She was voted number four in the 2008 edition, and number one in the 2009 edition, of AskMen.com's Top 99 Most Desirable Women. People also named her one of 2011's Most Beautiful at Every Age.

== Personal life ==
Mendes began dating music producer George Augusto in 2002. They broke up in 2011.

In 2008, she entered the Cirque Lodge Rehabilitation Centre in Utah to address a dependency problem related to drugs including alcohol.

In September 2011, she began dating Ryan Gosling, shortly after they filmed The Place Beyond the Pines together. They have two daughters, born in 2014 and 2016.

When asked in a 2022 interview if she and Gosling had married, Mendes said that "I like to keep it all mysterious". In another 2022 interview, she referred to Gosling as her husband.

Mendes is a pescetarian for ethical and health reasons. She also practices Transcendental Meditation.

== Filmography ==
=== Film ===
Year	Title	Role	Notes
1998	Children of the Corn V: Fields of Terror	Kir	Direct-to-video
1998	A Night at the Roxbury	Bridesmaid	
1999	My Brother the Pig	Matilda	
2000	Urban Legends: Final Cut	Vanessa Valdeon	
2001	Exit Wounds	Trish	
2001	Training Day	Sara	
2002	All About the Benjamins	Gina	
2003	2 Fast 2 Furious	Monica Fuentes	
2003	Once Upon a Time in Mexico	Ajedrez Barillo	
2003	Out of Time	Alex Díaz Whitlock	
2003	Stuck on You	April Mercedes	
2005	Hitch	Sara Melas	
2005	The Wendell Baker Story	Doreen	
2005	Guilty Hearts	Gabriella	
2006	Trust the Man	Faith Faison	
2007	Ghost Rider	Roxanne Simpson	
2007	Knocked Up	Herself	Uncredited cameo
2007	We Own the Night	Amada Juarez	
2007	Live!	Katy Courbet	Executive producer
2007	Cleaner	Ann Norcut	
2008	The Women	Crystal Allen	
2008	The Spirit	Sand Saref	
2009	Bad Lieutenant: Port of Call New Orleans	Frankie Donnenfeld	
2010	The Other Guys	Dr. Sheila Gamble	
2010	Last Night	Laura Nunez	
2011	Fast Five	Monica Fuentes	Post-credits scene; uncredited
2012	Holy Motors	Kay M.	
2012	Girl in Progress	Grace Gutierrez	
2012	The Place Beyond the Pines	Romina	
2014	Lost River	Cat	
2026	Star Wars: Starfighter		

=== Television ===
Year	Title	Role	Notes
1998	ER	Donna	Episode: "Exodus"
1998	Mortal Kombat: Conquest	Hanna	Episode: "Thicker Than Blood"
1999	V.I.P.	Esmeralda	Episode: "Val the Hard Way"
2000	The Disciples	Maria Serranco	Television film
2012	Half the Sky	Herself	Documentary
2013	Clear History	Jennifer	Television film
2021	Bluey	Yoga Instructor	Episode: "Born Yesterday"; Voice role

=== Music videos ===
Year	Artist	Title
1996	Pet Shop Boys	"Se a vida é (That's the Way Life Is)"
1997	Aerosmith	"Hole in My Soul"
1998	Will Smith	"Miami"
2003	Ludacris	"Act a Fool"
2004	The Strokes	"The End Has No End"
2005	Tony Yayo	"I Know You Don't Love Me" Feat. G-Unit

== Awards and nominations ==
Year	Award	Category	Work	Result
2002	ALMA Awards	Outstanding Supporting Actress in a Motion Picture	Training Day	Nominated
2004	Teen Choice Awards	Choice Movie: Female Breakout Star	—N/a	Nominated
2005	Capri Hollywood Awards	Capri Global Award	—N/a	Won
2005	Teen Choice Awards	Choice Movie: Love Scene	Hitch	Nominated
2006	ALMA Awards	Outstanding Actress in a Motion Picture	Hitch	Nominated
2007	ALMA Awards	Outstanding Actress in a Motion Picture	Trust the Man	Nominated
2007	Imagen Foundation Awards	Best Actress – Feature Film	Ghost Rider	Nominated
2009	ALMA Awards	Outstanding Actress in a Motion Picture	The Women and The Spirit	Nominated
2009	Giffoni Film Festival	Giffoni Award	—N/a	Won
2011	ALMA Awards	Favorite Movie Actress – Comedy/Musical	The Other Guys	Nominated
2011	Teen Choice Awards	Choice Movie Actress – Comedy	The Other Guys	Nominated
2012	Imagen Foundation Awards	Best Actress – Feature Film	Girl in Progress	Nominated
2012	ALMA Awards	Favorite Movie Actress – Drama/Adventure	Girl in Progress	Nominated
2013	Imagen Foundation Awards	Best Actress – Feature Film	The Place Beyond the Pines	Nominated
2016	Premios Juventud	Actriz Que Se Roba La Pantalla	—N/a	Nominated
