= Matthew Temple =

Matthew Temple may refer to:

- Matthew Temple (filmmaker)
- Matthew Temple (swimmer)
- Matt Temple (sound designer)
