= Caged (2020 film) =

2020 American drama film

- Official release poster
- Directed by: Aaron Fjellman
- Written by: Aaron Fjellman; James ‘Doc’ Mason
- Produced by: Pete Kirtley; Aaron Fjellman; Matthew Temple; Jessa Zarubica
- Starring: Edi Gathegi; Melora Hardin; Angela Sarafyan; Tony Amendola
- Cinematography: Jessica Young
- Music by: Cj Johnson
- Production companies: Panic House Productions; Shifty Eye Productions (in association with)
- Distributed by: Shout! Factory
- Release dates: March 14, 2020 (Pasadena International Film Festival); January 26, 2021 (United States)
- Running time: 81 minutes
- Country: United States
- Language: English

Caged is a 2020 American drama film directed by Aaron Fjellman and starring Edi Gathegi, Melora Hardin, Angela Sarafyan and Tony Amendola. Fjellman co-wrote the screenplay with James 'Doc' Mason. The film was produced by Pete Kirtley, Aaron Fjellman, Matthew Temple and Jessa Zarubica.

== Plot ==
An affluent African American psychiatrist is sent to federal prison after being found guilty of murdering his wife, and is then transferred to solitary confinement in the Security Housing Unit – (the SHU).

Despite maintaining his innocence, he finds himself a victim of prisoner abuse and, isolated and fighting for an appeal, slowly descends towards madness, pushed to breaking point by an abusive female guard hell bent on dispensing her own form of justice.

Increasingly haunted by internal demons and hallucinations involving his dead wife, he begins to question his own innocence and sanity, making his time in the SHU a never-ending nightmare.

== Cast ==
- Edi Gathegi as Dr. Harlow Reid
- Melora Hardin as Officer Sacks
- Angela Sarafyan as Amber Reid
- Tony Amendola as Warden Perez
- Robert R. Shafer as Officer Ganser
- James Jagger as Zeke
- Andy Mackenzie as The Voice
- Jessa Sarubica as Receptionist
- J. M. Scott as Fish
- Jose Rosete as Inmate AA91763
- Kenyon Glover as Inmate AA90046
- Chris Blasman as Officer Jones
- Roberto Montesinos as Officer Mendez
- Grifon Aldren as Officer Adebayo
- Pete Kirtley as Biohazard Man
- Paul Hatter as Mancha -Thug in Shower
- Matt Ramirez as Primo- Thug in Shower
- Omar Heyward as Omarion – Inmate in Shower
- Nicholas King as Ground Floor Watchman
- Anthony Arrigo as Tower Guard
- Izzy Traub as Gen-Pop Inmate
- Steve Bakken as Officer Warren
- Gabriel Jefferson as Officer Green
- Hoyt Richards as Harper
- Anzu Lawson as Shannon

== Filming and production ==
Filming, under its working title of The SHU, commenced in October 2016. Principal photography took place at Remmet Studios, in Canoga Park, Los Angeles with exterior filming at Long Beach Shoreline Marina, Palmdale and Anaheim, California. Post-production video and audio editing was carried out in Los Angeles and at Pinewood Studios in Iver.

== Release and critical reception ==
The film had its world premiere at the Pasadena International Film Festival in 2020 and was nominated for Best Feature Film, with Aaron Fjellman winning the Best Director award. Due to the COVID-19 pandemic the film was not released until 2021 in the United States, Canada, the United Kingdom and other territories.

It received mixed reviews but Rotten Tomatoes reported an approval rating of 72% based on 18 reviews with an average rating of 6.1/10.
