= Gacy (disambiguation) =

John Wayne Gacy (1942–1994) was an American serial killer and sex offender.

Gacy may also refer to:

== People ==
- Madonna Wayne Gacy (born 1964), stage name of Stephen Gregory Bier Jr., American keyboardist, formerly of Marilyn Manson
- Joe Gacy (Real name Joseph Ruby, born 1987), American professional wrestler signed to WWE

== Film ==
- Gacy (film), 2003 film about John Wayne Gacy
- Dear Mr. Gacy, 2010 Canadian film
- Dahmer Vs. Gacy, 2010 film
- 8213: Gacy House, 2010 film
- Bruce and Pepper Wayne Gacy's Home Movies, 1988 Canadian film
