= A Beautiful Life (2008 film) =

- Theatrical release poster
- Directed by: Alejandro Chomski
- Written by: Wendy Hammond
- Starring: Jesse Garcia; Angela Sarafyan; Bai Ling; Meltem Cumbul; Debi Mazar; Rena Owen; Jonathan LaPaglia; Dana Delany
- Cinematography: Nancy Schreiber
- Edited by: Alex Blatt
- Music by: Ruy Folguera
- Release dates: August 14, 2008 (LAFF); October 2, 2009 (United States)
- Running time: 81 minutes
- Country: United States
- Language: English

A Beautiful Life is a 2008 American drama film directed by Alejandro Chomski and starring Jesse Garcia and Angela Sarafyan. It was released by New Films International, adapted from the play Jersey City by Wendy Hammond. The film received a 0% score on the review aggregator site Rotten Tomatoes.

== Plot ==
A young woman, Maggie (Angela Sarafyan), is on the run from her abusive father. David (Jesse Garcia) is an illegal immigrant working as a dishwasher while searching for his mother in Los Angeles. The two meet and fall in love.

== Cast ==
- Angela Sarafyan as Maggie
- Jesse Garcia as David
- Bai Ling as Esther
- Meltem Cumbul as Antanas
- Debi Mazar as Susan
- Rena Owen as Sam
- Jonathan LaPaglia as Vince
- Dana Delany as Anne
- Enrique Castillo as Don Miguel
- Ronnie Gene Blevins as Henry
- Walter Perez as Enrico
- Ștefan Bănică Jr. as Jack
- Saadet Aksoy as Denise
- Andreea Marin Banica as Britney
- Tuba Ünsal as Sadenaz
- Kayla Paige as Lucy
- Deborah Calla as Virginia
- Royana Black as Cathy
- Dan Kelpine as Jim

== Release ==
Although produced in 2008, the film was not released widely in North America until October 2, 2009, and first appeared on DVD on March 1, 2011.

This was the second film by New Films International, a long-existing global independent film distribution company based in Sherman Oaks headed by Nesim Hason, whose new American division was led by Tim Swain. The company describes its focus as "festival-driven, high-quality, cast-driven indie films".

== Reception ==
A Beautiful Life received poor reviews from the twelve sources noted by the Rotten Tomatoes website. Metacritic gave the film a score of 13 out of 100, summarizing the reviews of the seven critics it measured as "overwhelming dislike".

The New York Times called it a "laughably clichéd dive into sexual masochism", and The Village Voice saw it as a "misery pile up ... about broken souls and crossed paths destined for the trash heap. Scream, smash, slap, cry, repeat."

Slant gave it a half-star out of four, saying that "its awfulness [comes] in so many forms that it's hard to single out just one appalling example". Variety felt that it provided "unintentional laughs by the barrel", and predicted that the film would be a box office bomb. NPR said that although the film deals with some serious topics, the random nature of characters and controversies made it hard to appreciate them, describing it as "too earnest to be a hoot, and too amateurish to be anything else".
