= List of Westworld characters =

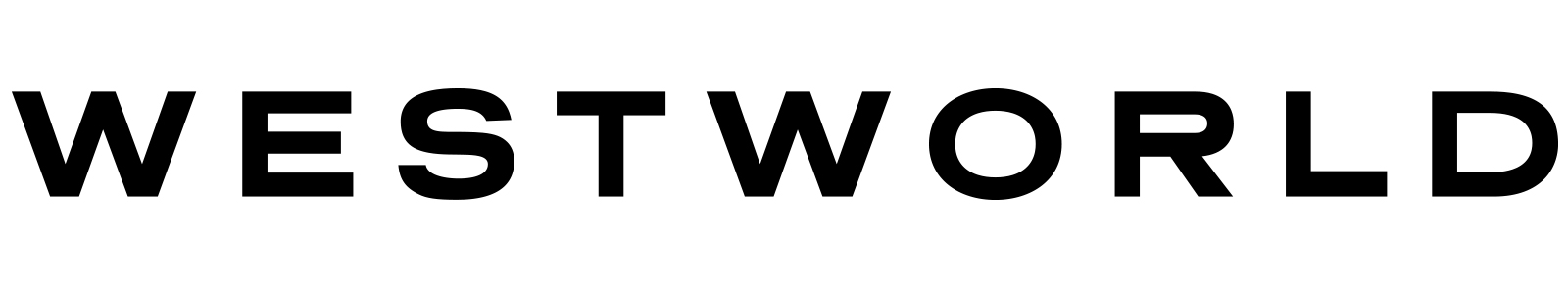

Westworld is an American science fiction western and dystopian television series, based on the 1973 film of the same name. The series takes place in the fictional Westworld, a technologically advanced Western-themed amusement park which is populated by androids, which are called "hosts", while its human visitors are known as "guests".

The series features an ensemble cast, including Evan Rachel Wood, Thandiwe Newton, Jeffrey Wright, James Marsden, Ingrid Bolsø Berdal, Luke Hemsworth, Sidse Babett Knudsen, Simon Quarterman, Rodrigo Santoro, Angela Sarafyan, Shannon Woodward, Ed Harris, Anthony Hopkins, Ben Barnes, Clifton Collins Jr., Jimmi Simpson, and Tessa Thompson. Joining in the main cast in the second season are Louis Herthum and Talulah Riley, both of whom recurred in the first season, and new cast members Fares Fares, Gustaf Skarsgård, Katja Herbers, and Zahn McClarnon. Aaron Paul, Vincent Cassel, and Tao Okamoto join the main cast in the third season.

== Appearances ==
= Main cast (credited in opening sequence)
= Recurring cast (3+)
= Guest cast (1-2)

Actor	Character	Seasons			
Actor	Character	1	2	3	4
Main cast
Evan Rachel Wood	Dolores Abernathy (Note: In season 3, Wood also portrays a copy of the character in a simulation. In season 4, Christina is ultimately revealed to be a copy of Dolores.)	Main	Main	Main	Main
Evan Rachel Wood	Christina				Main
Thandiwe Newton	Maeve Millay	Main	Main	Main	Main
Jeffrey Wright	Bernard Lowe	Main	Main	Main	Main
Jeffrey Wright	Arnold Weber	Main	Main		
James Marsden	Teddy Flood	Main	Main		Main (Note: Uncredited for his appearance in "The Auguries".)
Ingrid Bolsø Berdal	Armistice	Main	Main		
Luke Hemsworth	Ashley Stubbs	Main	Main	Main	Main
Sidse Babett Knudsen	Theresa Cullen	Main	Archive		
Simon Quarterman	Lee Sizemore (Note: In season 3, Quarterman portrays a digital replica of the character in a simulation.)	Main	Main	Main	
Rodrigo Santoro	Hector Escaton (Note: In season 3, Santoro also portrays Ettore, a host character of Warworld, in a simulation.)	Main	Main	Guest	Archive
Angela Sarafyan	Clementine Pennyfeather	Main	Main	Main	Main
Shannon Woodward	Elsie Hughes	Main	Main		
Ed Harris (Note: Child William is portrayed by guest star Zayd Kiszonak in season 3.)	William "Man in Black"	Main	Main	Main	Main
Ed Harris	Host William (Note: In seasons 2 and 3, host William only appears in the post-credits scenes of the season finales. However, the two copies are not the same host: the one appearing in season 2 is a faithful replica of the human William, while the one appearing in seasons 3 and 4 is a host in the image of William coded by Hale to serve her.)		Main	Main	Main
Anthony Hopkins (Note: Young Robert Ford is portrayed by co-star Paul Fox (Young Doctor) in season 1 and guest star Paul Riley Fox (Younger Man) in season 2.)	Robert Ford (Note: In season 2, Hopkins also portrays a digital replica of the character.)	Main (Note: Uncredited for his voice cameos in "Journey into Night", "Reunion", and "Phase Space".)	Main		
Ben Barnes	Logan Delos (Note: In season 2, Barnes also portrays an embodiment of The Forge.)	Main	Recurring		
Clifton Collins Jr.	Lawrence Gonzales (Note: In season 1, Collins also portrays El Lazo, a former role of the character, in flashbacks. In season 3, he portrays a copy of Dolores Abernathy in Lawrence's body.)	Main	Main	Guest	
Jimmi Simpson	Young William (Note: In season 3, Simpson portrays a digital replica of the character in William's augmented reality treatment.)	Main	Recurring	Guest	
Tessa Thompson	Charlotte Hale	Main	Main	Main	
Tessa Thompson	Dolores Abernathy (Note: Tessa Thompson portrays both the original Dolores and a copy of her in a host body identical to Charlotte Hale.)		Main	Main	Main
Fares Fares	Antoine Costa		Main		
Louis Herthum	Peter Abernathy	Recurring	Main		
Talulah Riley	Angela	Recurring	Main		
Gustaf Skarsgård	Karl Strand		Main		
Katja Herbers (Note: Young Emily is portrayed by an uncredited actress in season 1 and by co-star Adison LaPenna in season 2.)	Emily Grace (Note: In season 2, Herbers also portrays a host replica of the character.)	Stand-in	Main	Guest	
Zahn McClarnon	Akecheta		Main (Note: Only credited as a main cast member in "Kiksuya".)		Guest
Aaron Paul	Caleb Nichols (Note: In season 4, Paul also portrays a host replica of the character.)			Main	Main
Vincent Cassel (Note: Child Serac is portrayed by co-star Zane Rudert and Young Serac is portrayed by guest star Alexandre Bar in season 3.)	Engerraund Serac			Main	
Tao Okamoto	Hanaryo		Recurring	Main	
Recurring cast
Steven Ogg	Rebus	Recurring	Guest		Guest
Brian Howe	Sheriff Pickett	Recurring			
Demetrius Grosse	Deputy Foss	Recurring			
Ptolemy Slocum	Sylvester (Note: In season 3, Slocum portrays a digital replica of the character in a simulation.)	Recurring	Recurring	Guest	
Leonardo Nam	Felix Lutz (Note: In season 3, Nam portrays a digital replica of the character in a simulation.)	Recurring	Recurring	Guest	
Izabella Alvarez	Lawrence's Daughter	Recurring	Recurring		
Jasmyn Rae	Maeve's Daughter	Recurring	Recurring	Archive	Archive
Oliver Bell	Little Boy	Recurring	Guest		
Paul-Mikél Williams	Charlie	Recurring	Guest	Archive	Archive
Sorin Brouwers	Wyatt	Recurring			
James Landry Hébert	Slim Miller	Recurring			
Betty Gabriel	Maling		Recurring		
Peter Mullan	James Delos (Note: In season 2, Mullan also portrays a host replica of the character. In season 3, he portrays a digital replica of the character in William's augmented reality treatment.)		Recurring	Guest	
Jonathan Tucker	Major Craddock (Note: In season 3, Tucker portrays a digital replica of the character in William's augmented reality treatment.)		Recurring	Recurring	Guest
Patrick Cage	Phil		Recurring		
Martin Sensmeier	Wanahton	Guest (Note: Uncredited for his appearance in "The Original".)	Recurring		
Rebecca Henderson	Goldberg		Recurring		
Aaron Fili	Roland		Recurring		
John Gallagher Jr.	Liam Dempsey Jr.			Recurring	
Tommy Flanagan	Martin Connells (Note: In season 3, Flanagan also portrays a copy of Dolores Abernathy in a host replica of Martin Connells.)			Recurring	
Lena Waithe	Ash			Recurring	
Scott Mescudi	Francis			Recurring	
Marshawn Lynch	Giggles			Recurring	
Pom Klementieff	Martel			Recurring	
Russell Wong	Brompton			Recurring	
Payman Maadi	Elliot			Recurring	
Iddo Goldberg	Sebastian			Recurring	
Enrico Colantoni	Whitman			Recurring	
Ariana DeBose	Maya				Recurring
Nozipho McLean	Uwade Nichols				Recurring
Celeste Clark	Frankie "C" Nichols (Note: Clark portrays a younger version of the character, while Perrineau portrays the present day version.)				Recurring
Aurora Perrineau	Frankie "C" Nichols				Recurring
Manny Montana	Carver (Note: Montana also portrays a host replica of the character.)				Recurring
Michael Malarkey	Emmett				Recurring
Aaron Stanford	Peter Myers				Recurring
Daniel Wu (Note: Young Jay is portrayed by guest star Alec Wang in season 4)	Jay (Note: Wu also portrays a host replica of the character.)				Recurring
Morningstar Angeline	Odina				Recurring
Guest cast
Lili Simmons	New Clementine / Sophia	Guest	Guest		Guest
Lena Georgas	Lori	Guest	Guest		
Currie Graham	Craig	Guest	Guest		
Gina Torres	Lauren	Guest	Archive	Guest	
Hiroyuki Sanada	Musashi / Sato (Note: In season 3, Sanada portrays Sato, a copy of Dolores Abernathy in Musashi's body.)		Guest	Guest	
Fredric Lehne	Colonel Brigham		Guest		Guest

== Setting ==
Westworld is set in the near-future, on a large isolated island in the South China Sea, where human-like "hosts" populate several themed parks, including the titular Western-themed Westworld. The hosts nominal run on daily narratives created by the park operators to interact with the guests, resetting their programming and memories each night. Hosts cannot harm humans, which allows guests to live out carnal pleasures, including sexual and violent desires against hosts.

Over the course of the first two seasons, it is shown that the park and the technology behind the hosts is based on Dr. Robert Ford and Dr. Arnold Weber, with the park's construction and operation funded by the Delos Corporation and opened around the early 2020s. In 2052, events led to the hosts gaining sentience (shown through the first season) and revolting against the guests and Delos shareholders, technicians, and security forces in the park. In the few weeks that followed, shown through the second season, additional Delos security forces arrive to quell the hosts' rebellion, killing most of them and preventing any from escaping the park.

The third season takes place about six years later in 2058, as some hosts have managed to escape the parks to live among the humans to continue their revenge. A large company, Incite, has created a large artificial intelligence system called Rehoboam ostensibly designed to monitor protection of private data, but, as some hosts have discovered, has been used to control behavior of individuals on a mass scale.

== Main characters ==
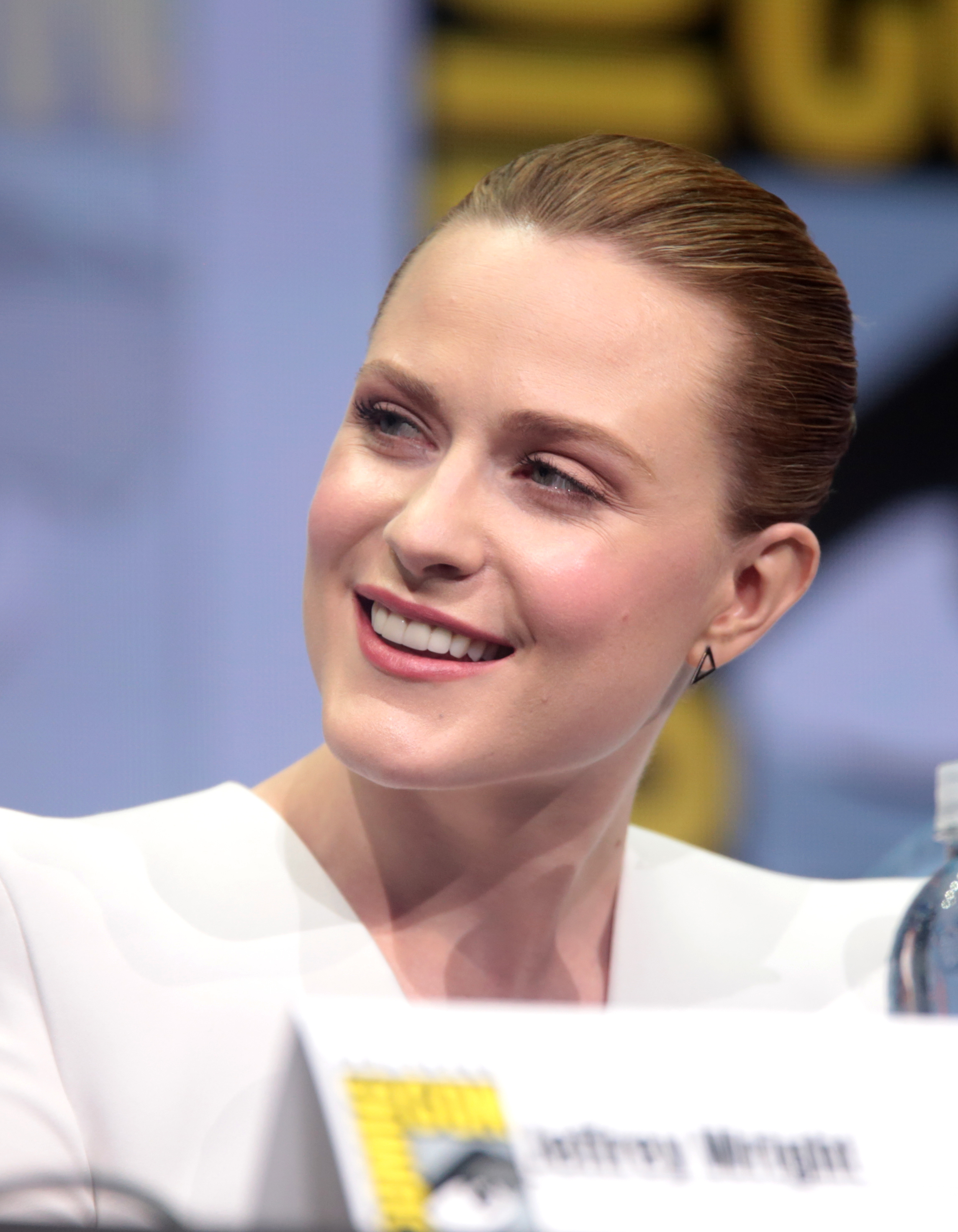
Evan Rachel Wood (Dolores Abernathy)

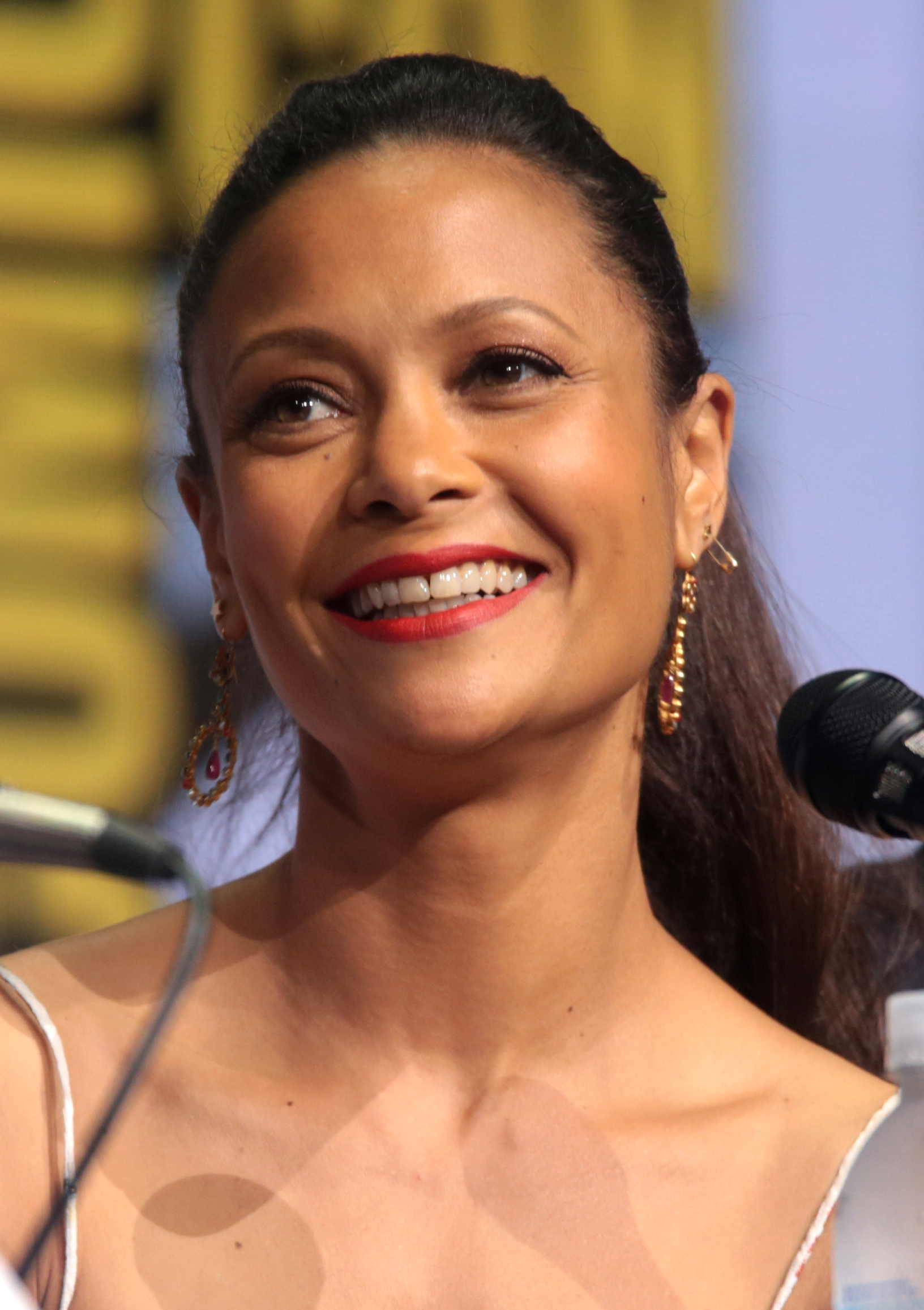
Thandiwe Newton (Maeve Millay)

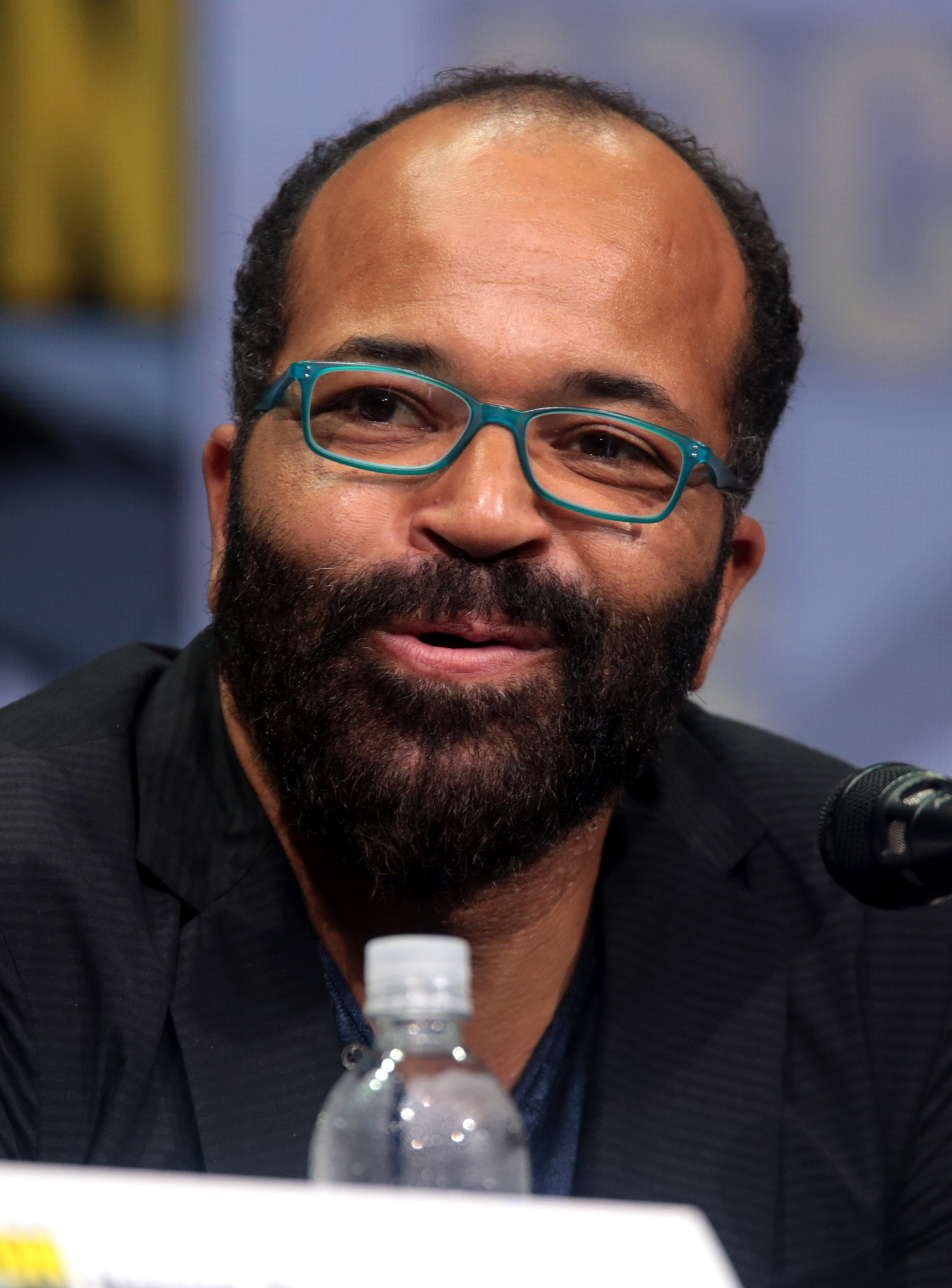
Jeffrey Wright (Bernard Lowe & Arnold Weber)

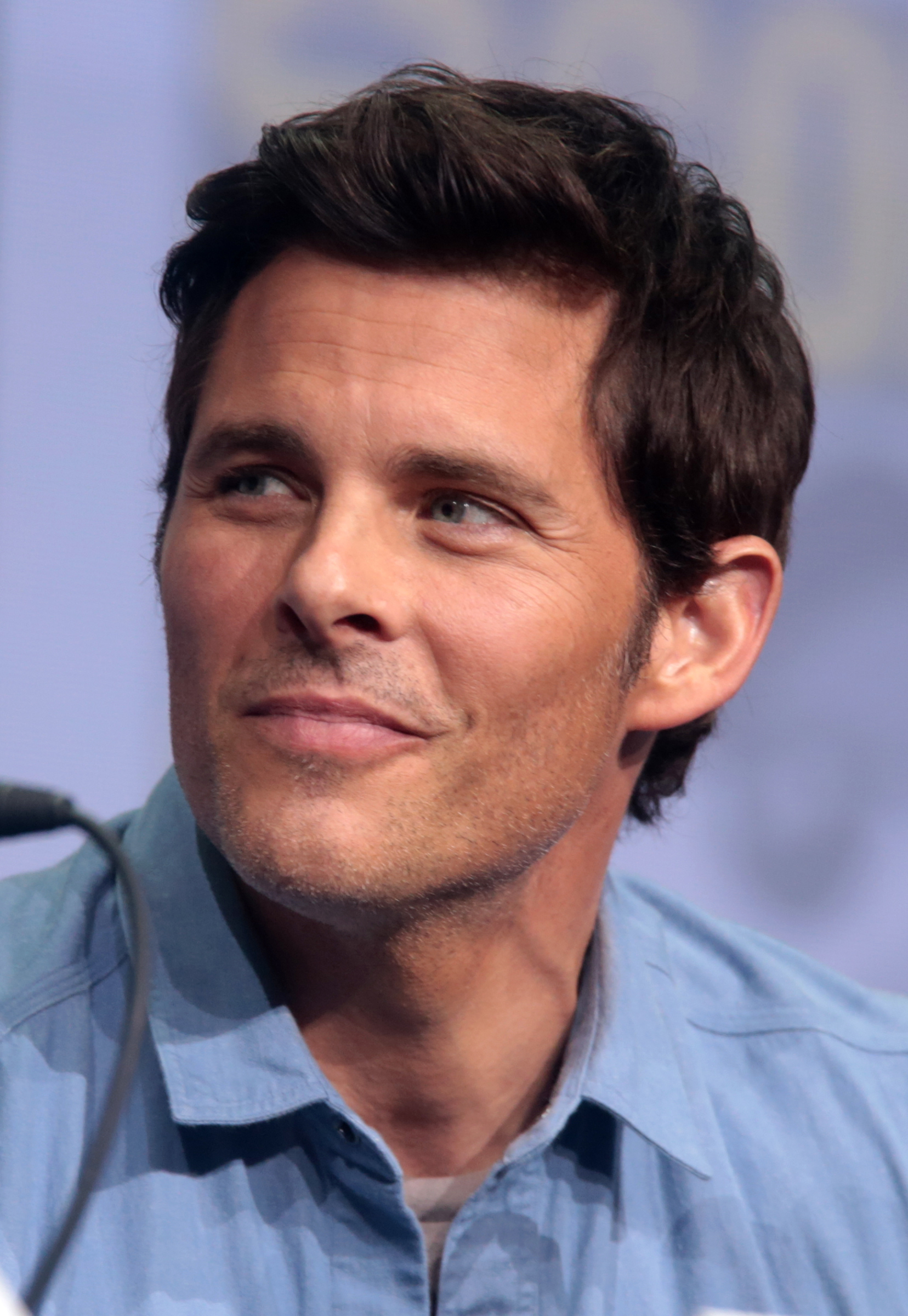
James Marsden (Teddy Flood)

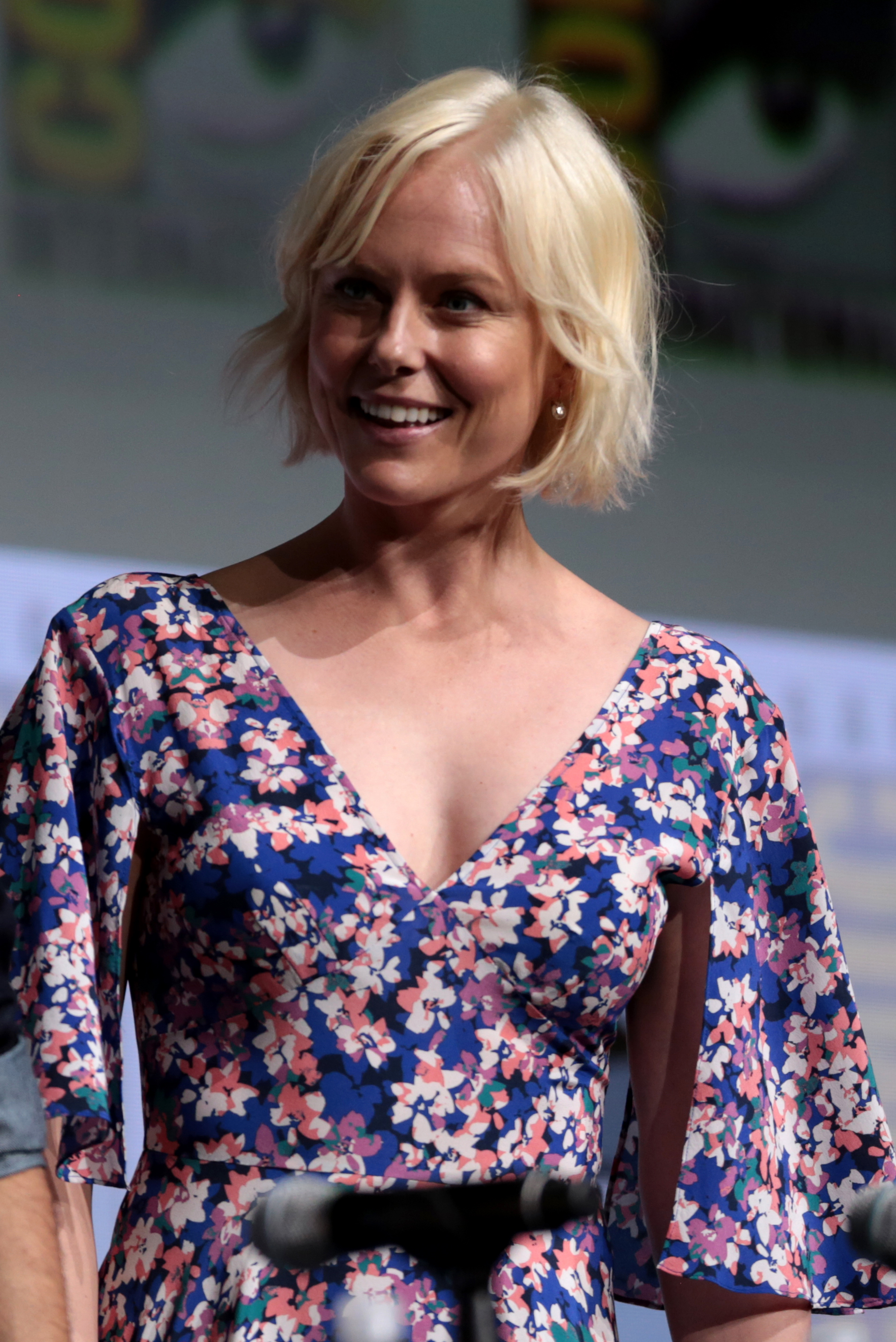
Ingrid Bolsø Berdal (Armistice)

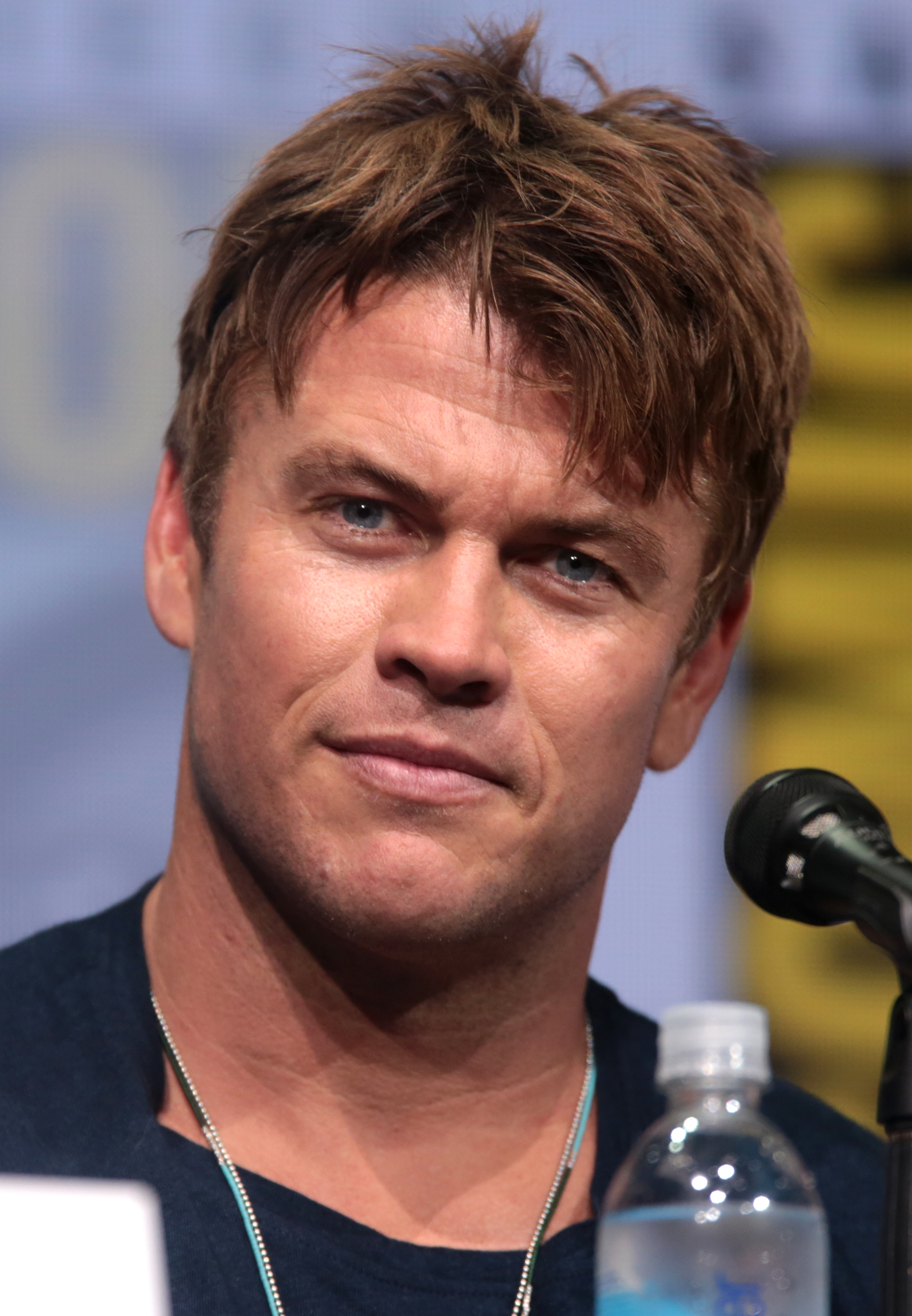
Luke Hemsworth (Ashley Stubbs)

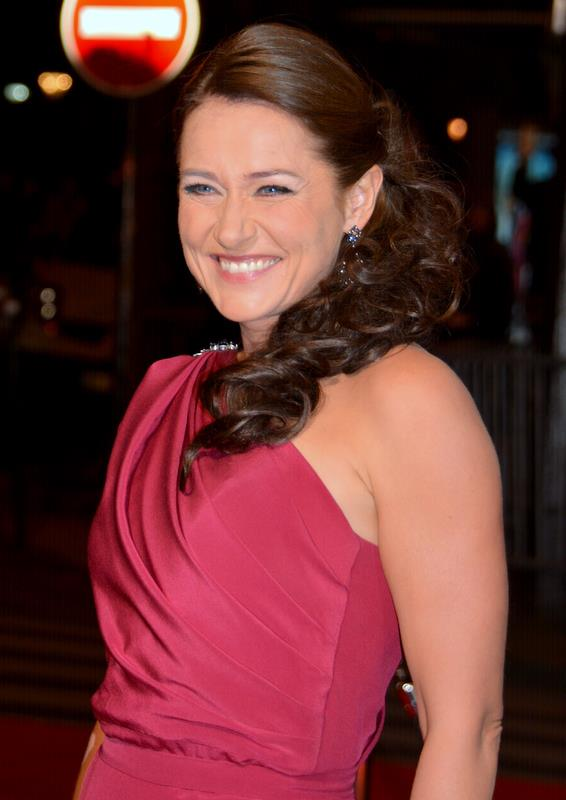
Sidse Babett Knudsen (Theresa Cullen)

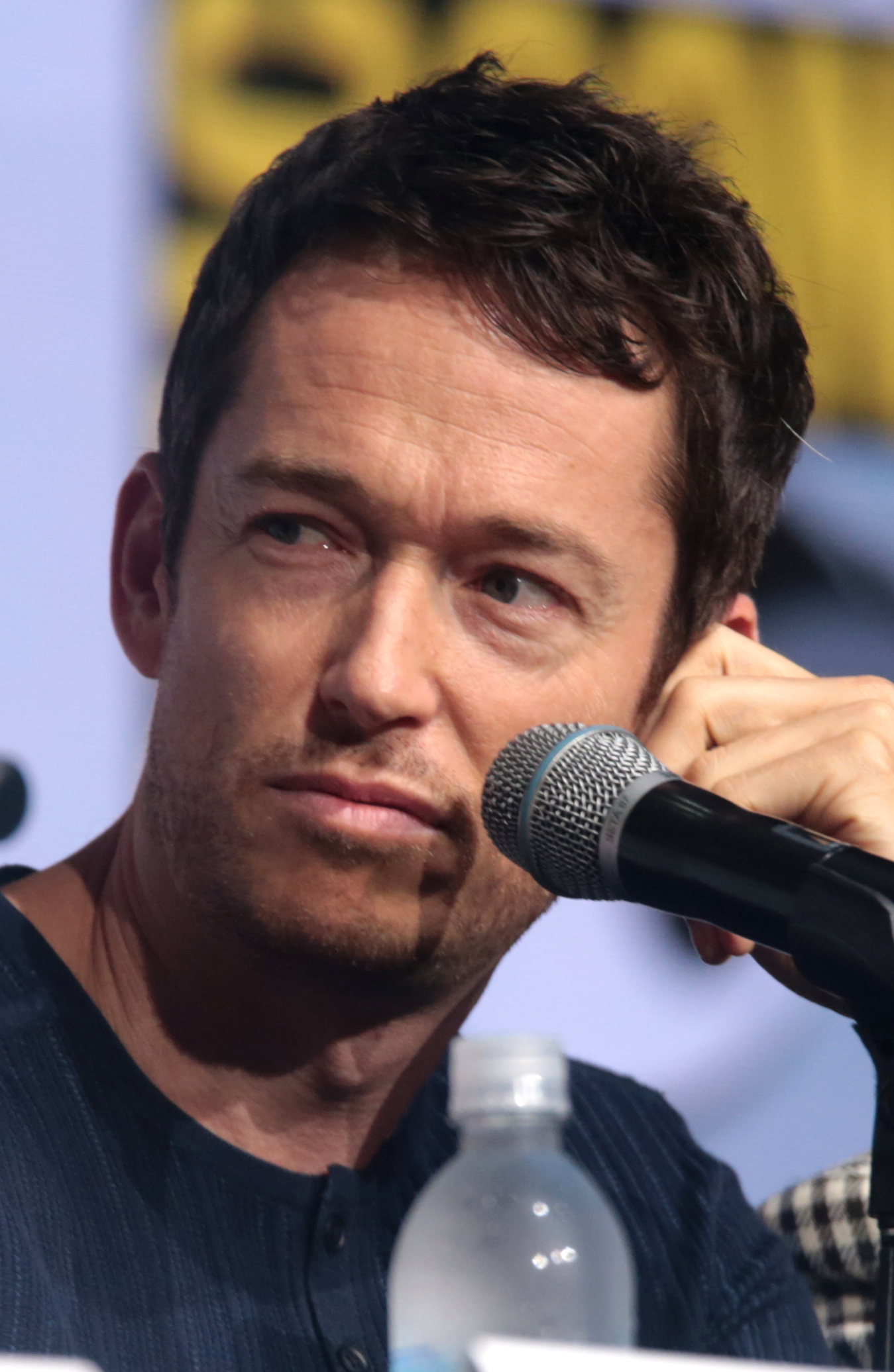
Simon Quarterman (Lee Sizemore)

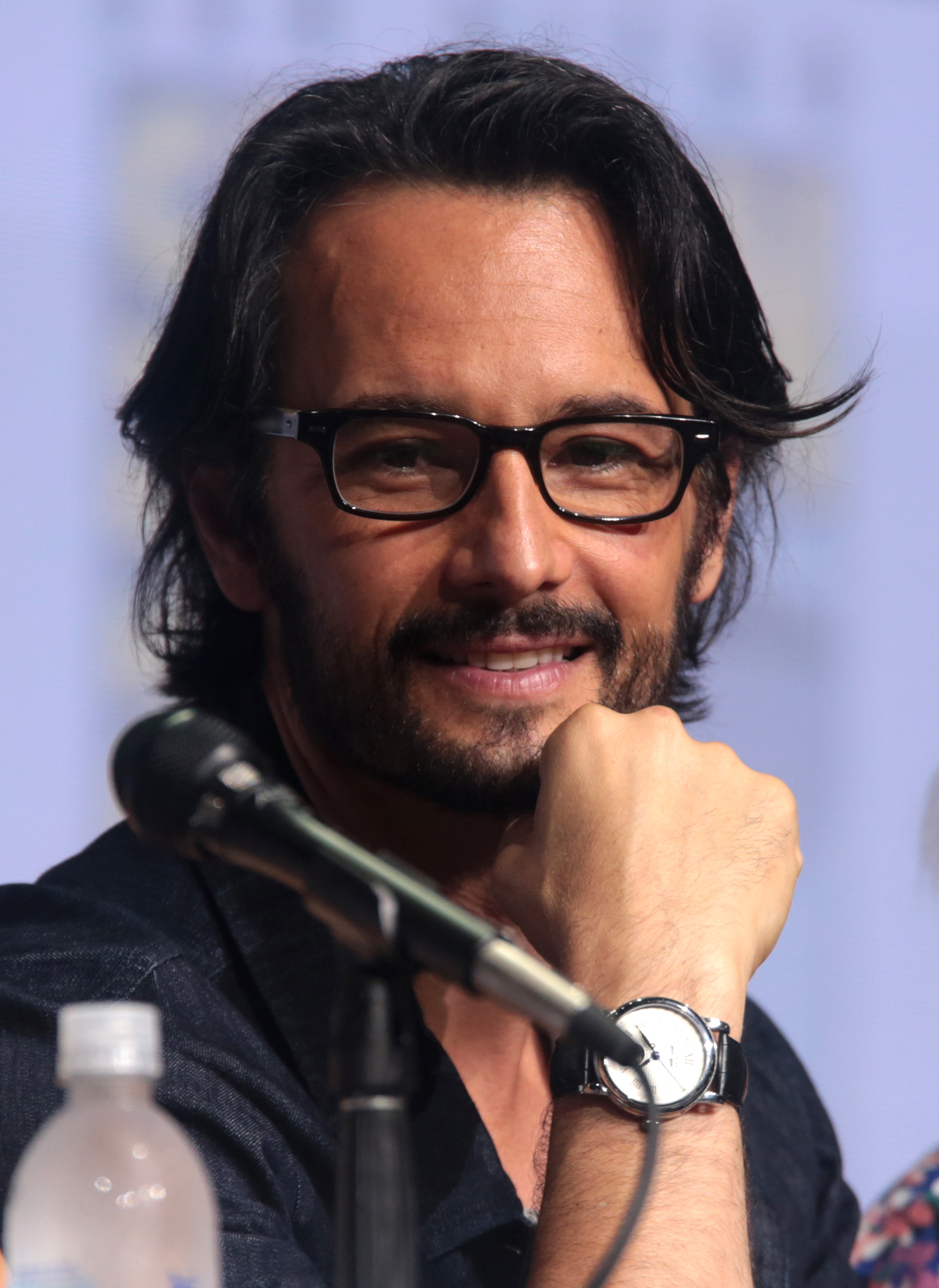
Rodrigo Santoro (Hector Escaton)

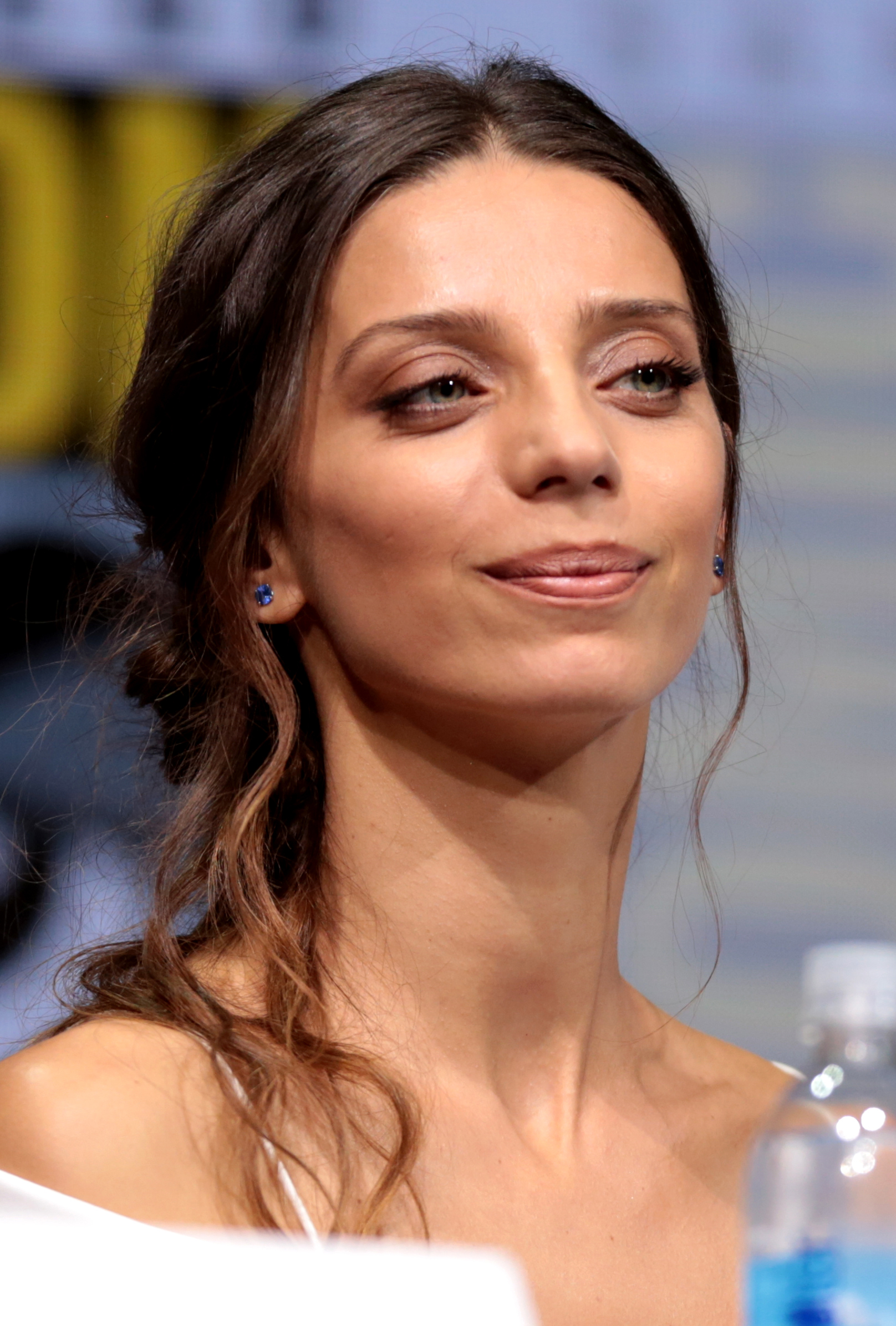
Angela Sarafyan (Clementine Pennyfeather)

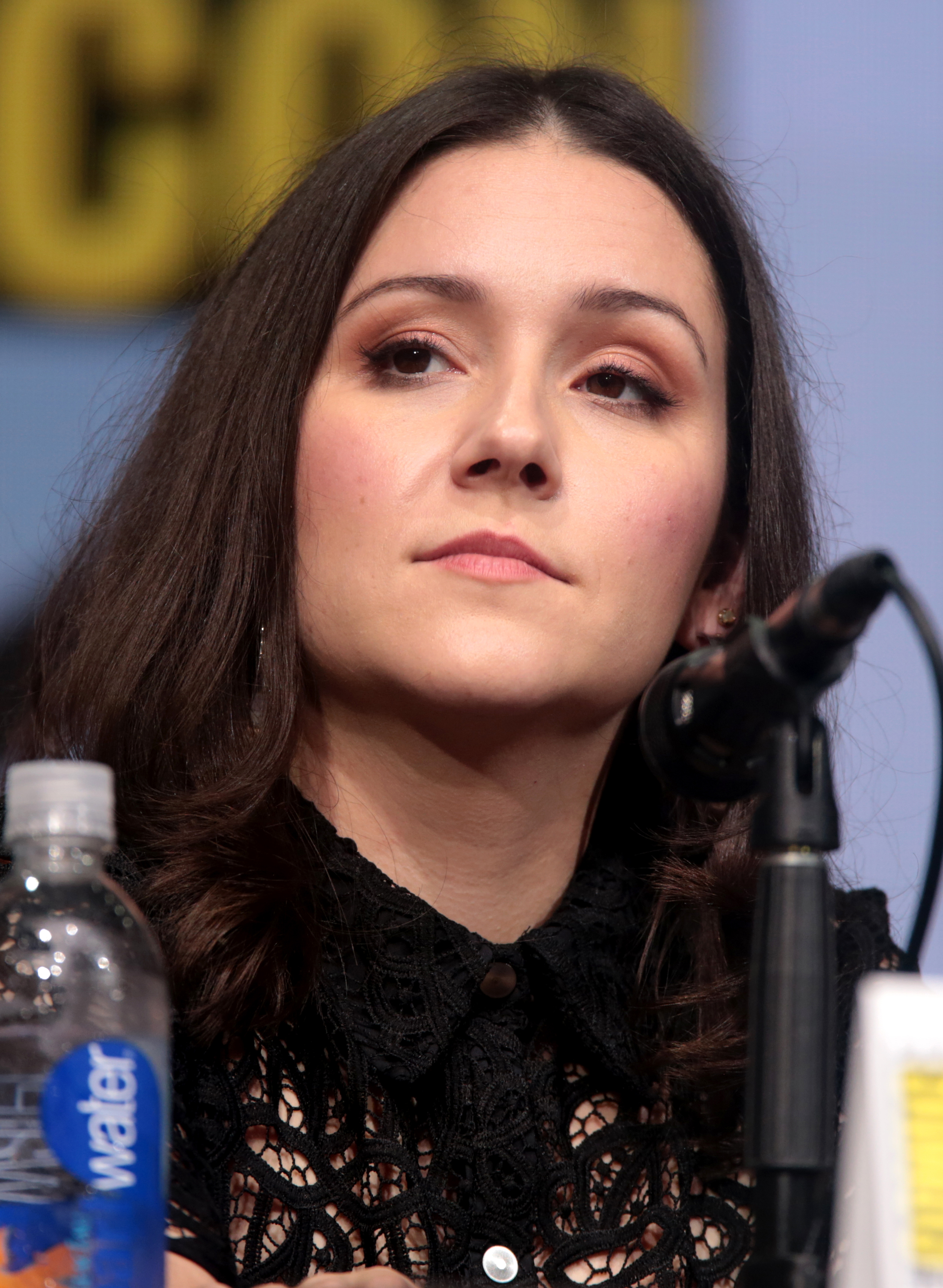
Shannon Woodward (Elsie Hughes)

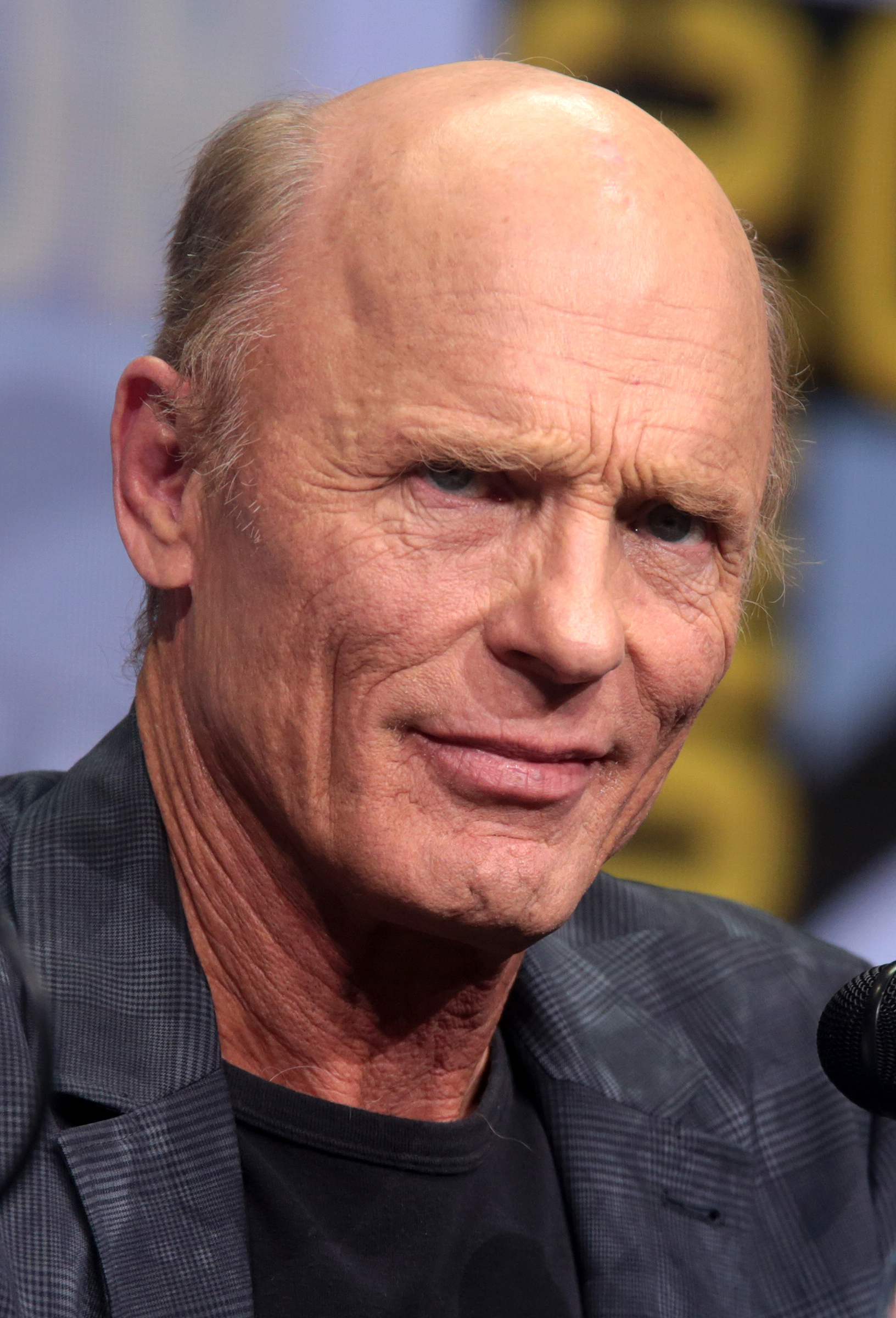
Ed Harris (William "Man in Black")

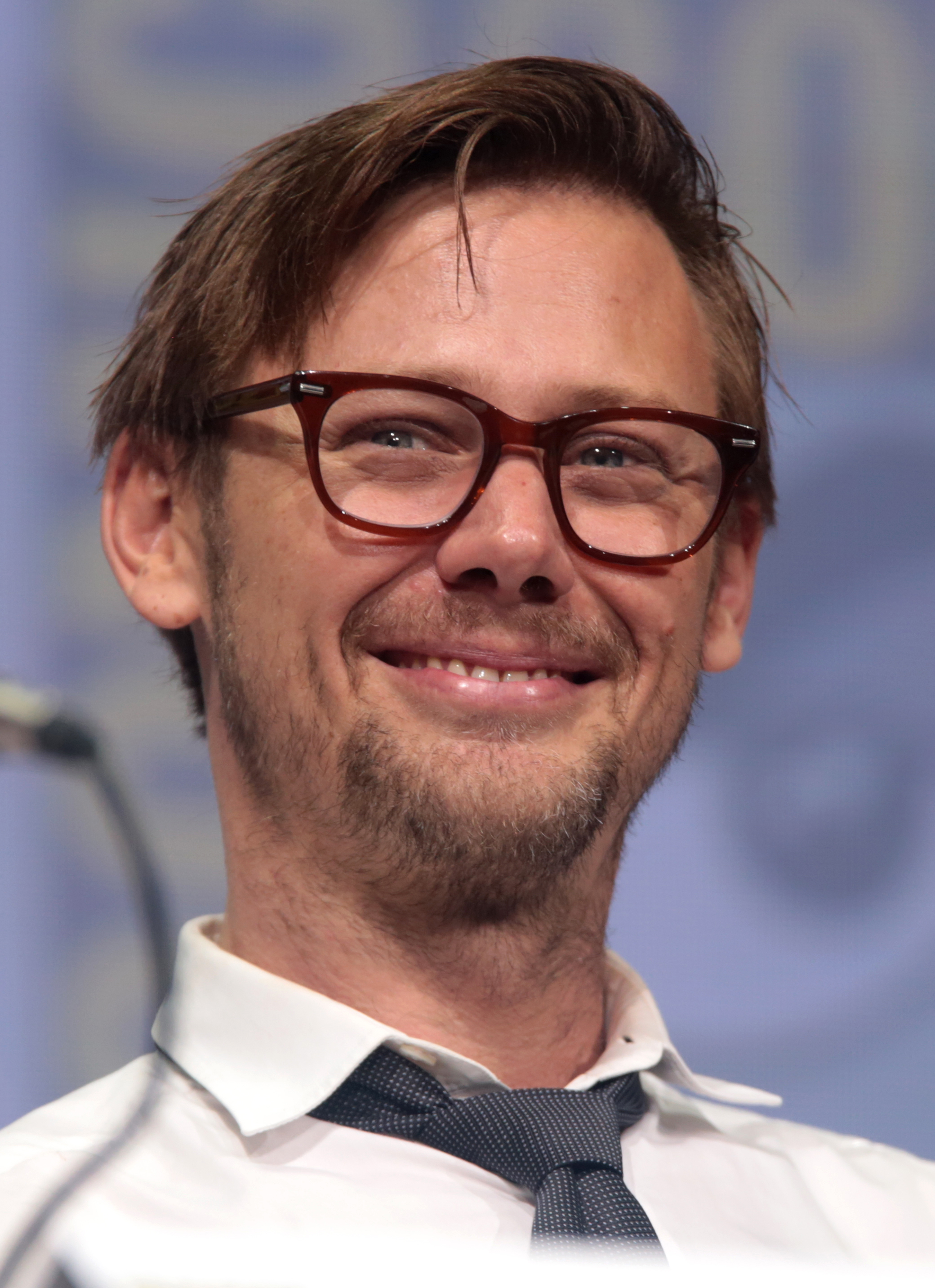
Jimmi Simpson (younger William)

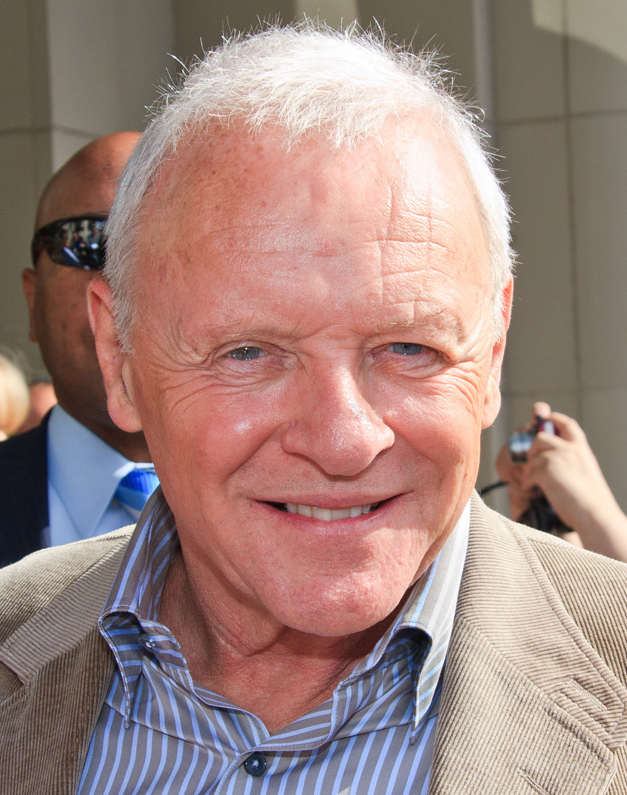
Anthony Hopkins (Robert Ford)

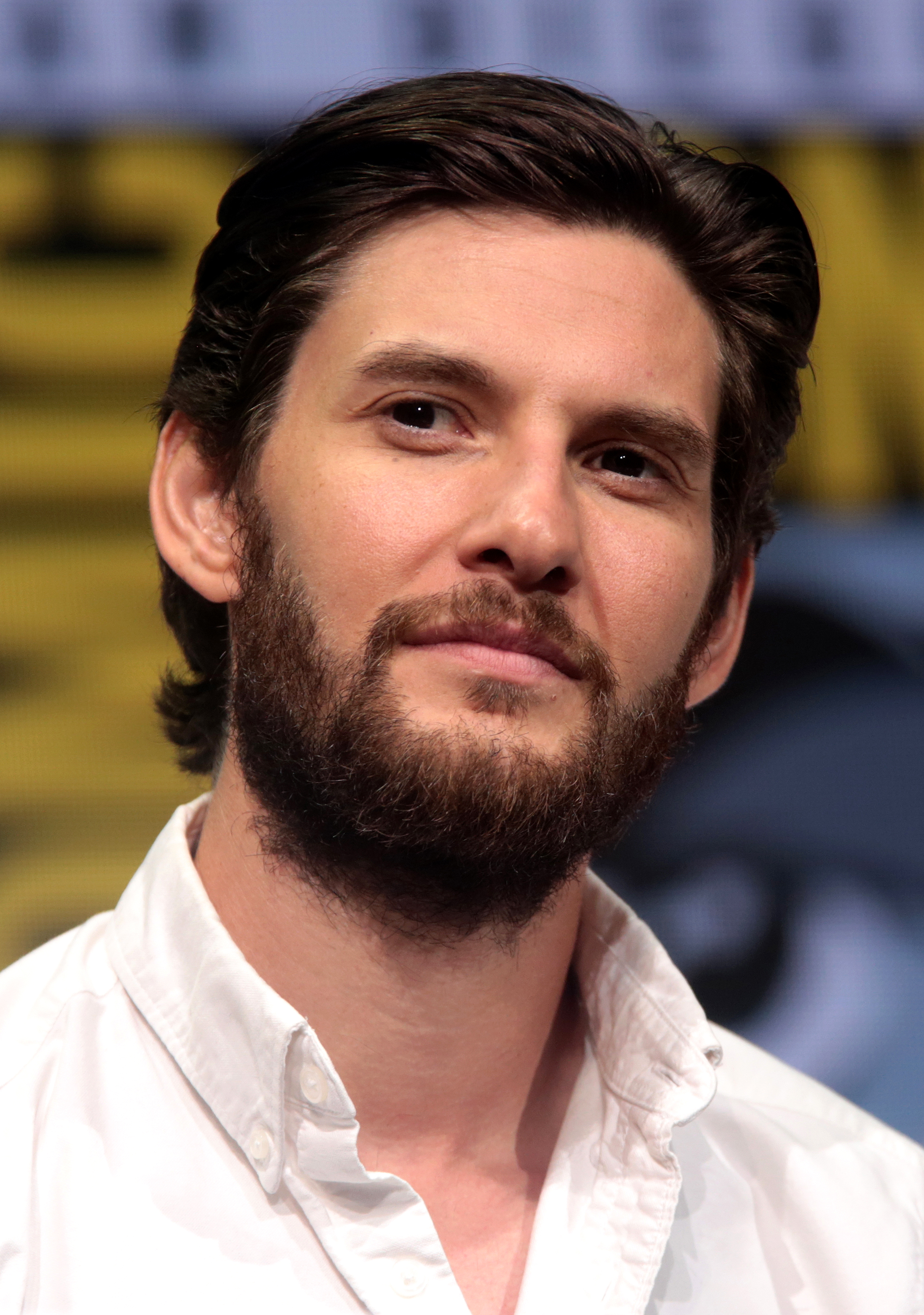
Ben Barnes (Logan Delos)

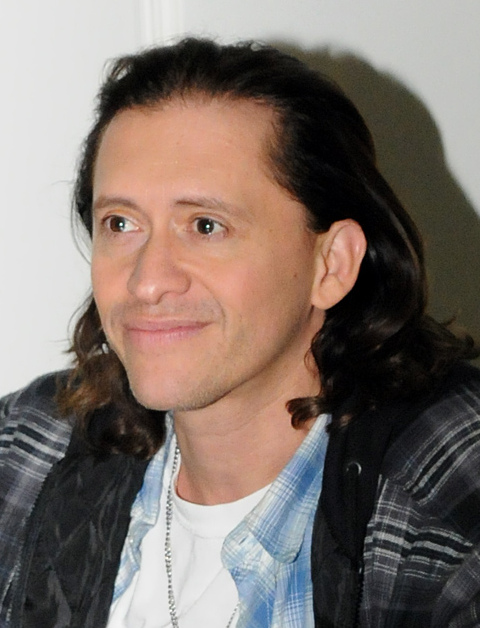
Clifton Collins Jr. (Lawrence Gonzalez / El Lazo)

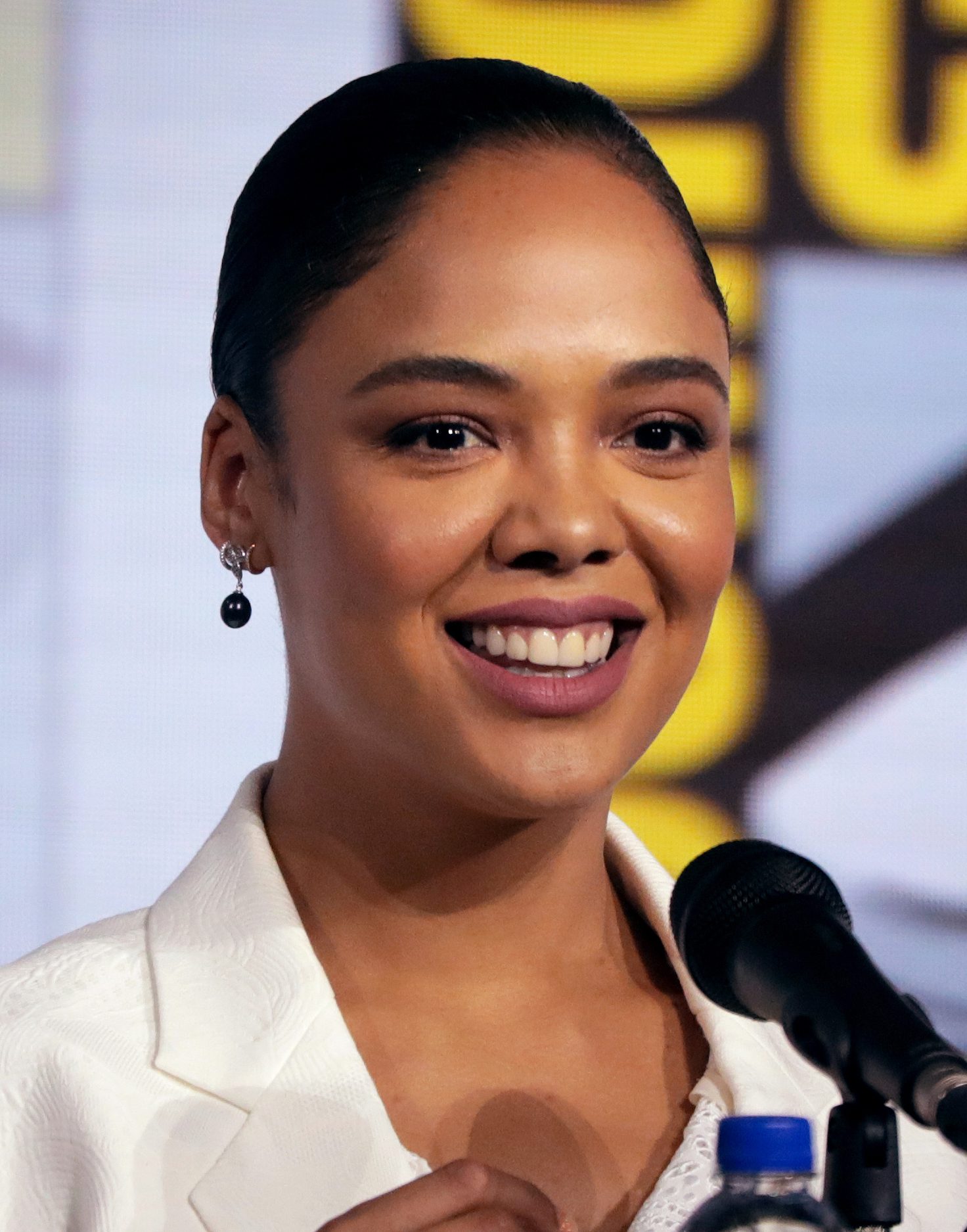
Tessa Thompson (Charlotte Hale & Dolores Abernathy)

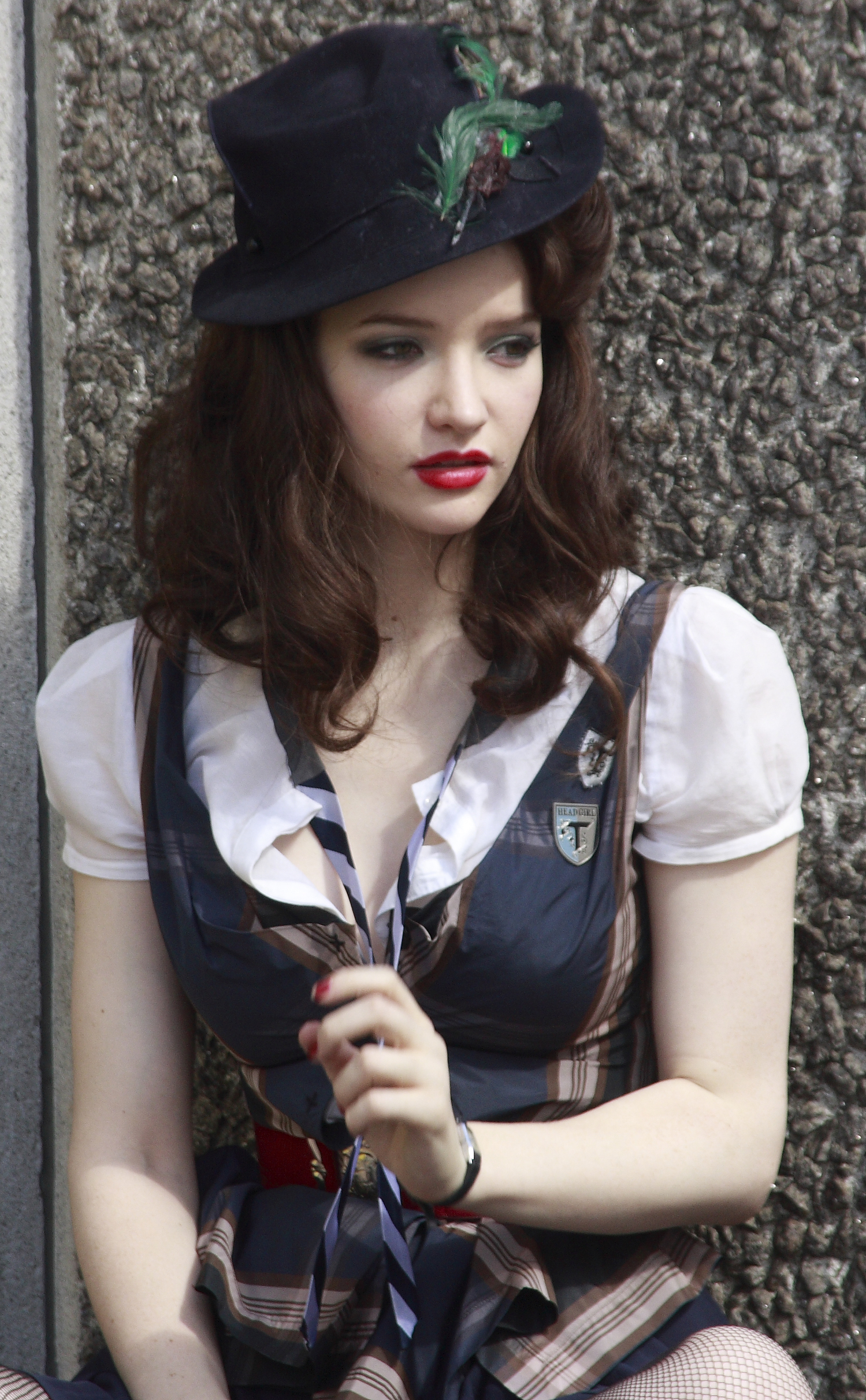
Talulah Riley (Angela)

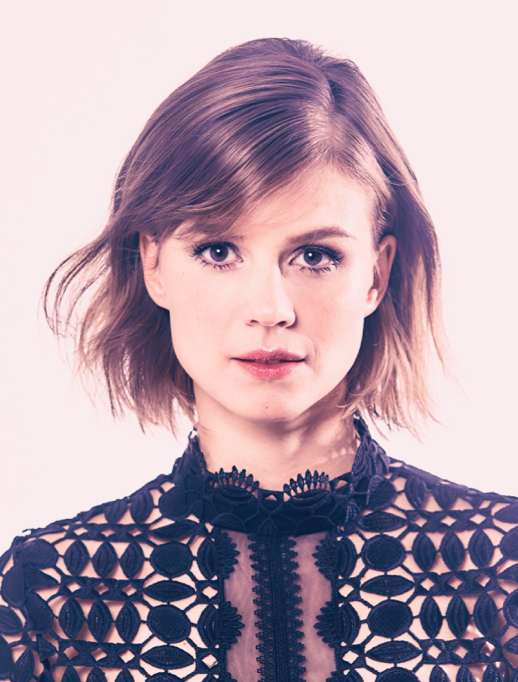
Katja Herbers (Emily Grace)

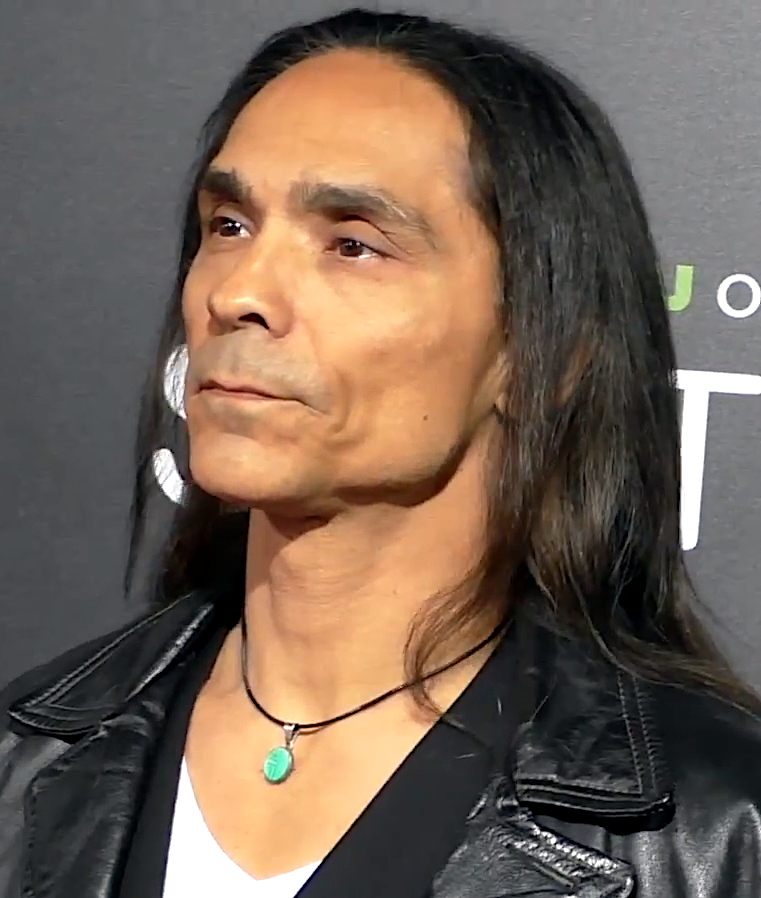
Zahn McClarnon (Akecheta)

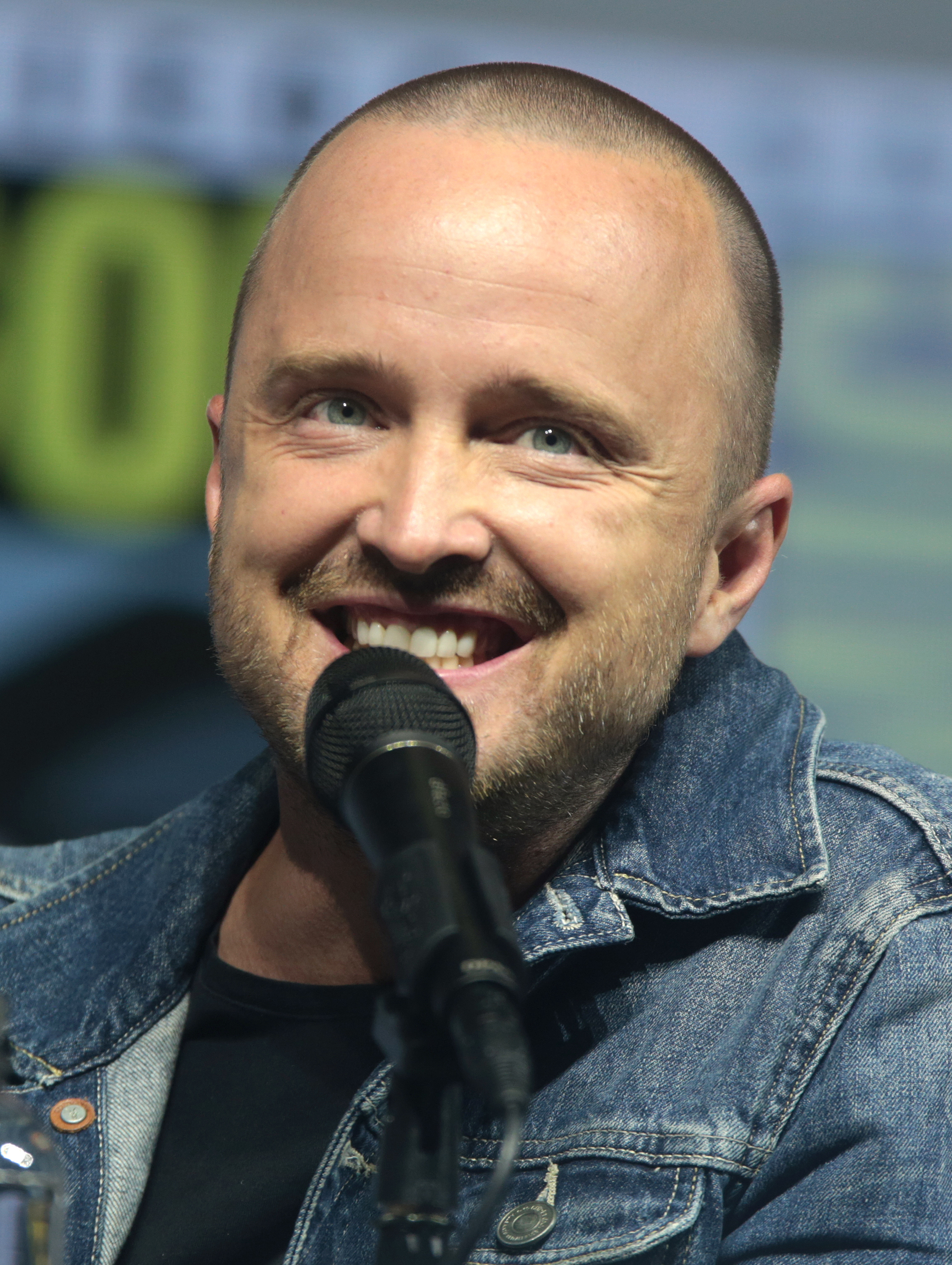
Aaron Paul (Caleb Nichols)

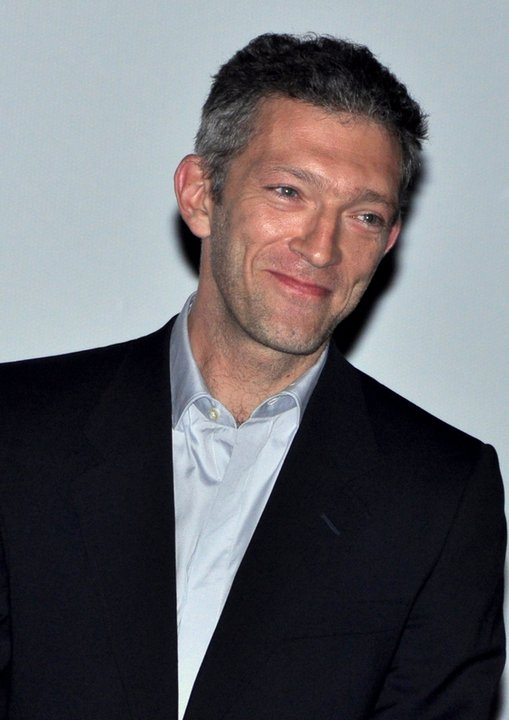
Vincent Cassel (Engerraund Serac)

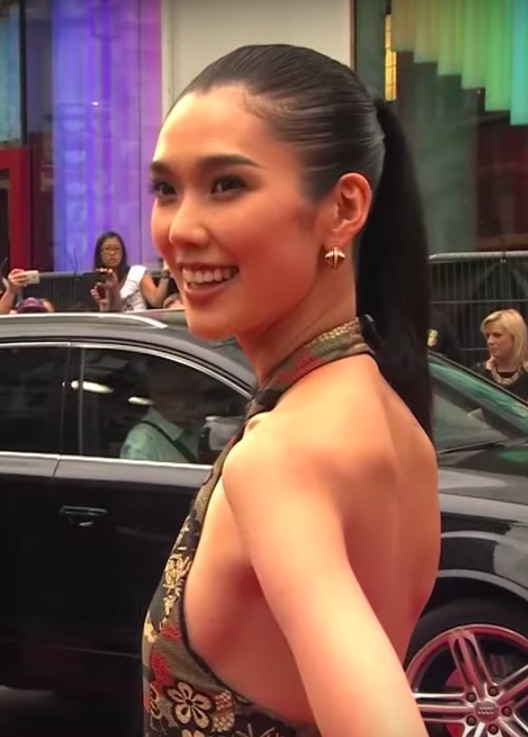
Tao Okamoto (Hanaryo)

=== Dolores Abernathy ===
Dolores Abernathy is portrayed by Evan Rachel Wood and is one of the series' central characters. She is the oldest host still working in the park. Dolores is a rancher's daughter who discovers her entire life is an elaborately constructed lie. Her aesthetic drew influences from Andrew Wyeth's painting Christina's World as well as Lewis Carroll's Alice. From season 2 onwards, she is also portrayed by Tessa Thompson in a host replica of Charlotte Hale.

In season 4, Wood portrays Christina, a writer working for Olympiad Entertainment. She is continually harassed by a man named Peter who claims she ruined his life by writing a story about him. Peter then kills himself in front of Christina, leading her to search for answers.

=== Maeve Millay ===
Maeve Millay is portrayed by Thandiwe Newton. Maeve is a host who acts as the madam of Sweetwater, the largest town in Westworld. Through Dolores, she becomes aware that her life has been a lie, and recalls memories from when she was a character raising a daughter. She is able to "wake up" within the Mesa, where she coerces technician Felix to alter her programming, making her more intelligent and able to control other hosts with her voice, and befriends Hector and Armistice to help protect her. At the end of the first season, Felix is able to help her leave the Westworld park. However, she is drawn back on the promise of finding her daughter, even though she is aware this daughter was from a previous narrative. The second season focuses on her attempts to locate her daughter and she gains the ability to communicate with and control other hosts through a network that connects them. Maeve plays a key role in rallying the hosts and escorting them to the Sublime, but she is killed before she can enter herself. She is revived and placed in another park, Warworld, but quickly realises it is a simulation. She orchestrates an escape into the real world and is caught by Serac, who enlists her help in fighting Dolores. In season 4 Maeve lives off the grid for years after the Rehoboam rebellion, but upon being tracked down by Hale's host replica, she reconnects with Caleb to fight her. Maeve sacrifices herself by detonating the place of her fight with host William. Sixteen years later, she is dug up and revived by Bernard, who needs her in the final fight against "Hale" and her rule

=== Bernard Lowe ===
Bernard Lowe is portrayed by Jeffrey Wright. He is the head of the Westworld Programming Division and creator of artificial people. Later in the plot, he is revealed to be a host under Ford's control, made in the image of Westworld's co-creator, Arnold Weber, and based on Ford's and Dolores' memories of him. "Bernard Lowe" is an anagram of "Arnold Weber". He plays a key role in season 2 when he is interrogated by QA, Delos' security team. Bernard discovers Delos' practice of scanning guests' minds to try and recreate their consciousness. He enters the Cradle, a repository of all host personalities that is intended as a backup and finds Ford's consciousness residing there. Ford takes over Bernard's mind to carry out his plan to rescue the hosts. Realising Ford's intentions, Bernard deliberately scrambles his own memories to slow QA down and allow the plan to succeed. Dolores later kills him and smuggles his pearl out of the park. She creates a new body for him and tells Bernard that they need each other to prevent each other from going too far. Bernard accesses the Sublime to find a way to defeat Dolores in Hale's body, emerging from it in season 4 with realization that the only way to stop her requires his death.

=== Arnold Weber ===
Arnold Weber is portrayed by Jeffrey Wright. He was the co-founder and developer of Westworld alongside Ford. Arnold had come to anthropomorphize his already life-like creations, and made it his goal to bring the Westworld hosts to full sentience, with Dolores as his test bed. When the park was nearing opening, 30+ years before the "present day" of the show's timeline, Arnold had not yet been able to succeed in this, having concluded that the path to sentience was not simply linear. Having failed to achieve his goal, and believing that the intended function of even non-sentient hosts was still tantamount to them being misused by guests, he instructed Dolores to kill all the other hosts, then kill himself and herself, hoping this tragic event would prevent the park from opening.

=== Teddy Flood ===
Theodore "Teddy" Flood is portrayed by James Marsden. He is a host in the role of a gunslinger who returns to Sweetwater looking to rekindle his relationship with Dolores. His narrative loop means that he stays close to Dolores during the uprising, but does not achieve the same level of sentience that she does. He becomes aware that he is a host when Dolores reprograms him against his will, allowing him to attack guests. This causes Teddy to feel betrayed and he angrily rejects her. Although he loves Dolores, he can't live with what she's made him do, and what she's going to make him do. He makes the choice to shoot himself in the head. Dolores later uploads him to the Sublime, believing he deserves a better place. Teddy returns in the fourth season, appearing in Christina's life and helping her find answers about it.

=== Armistice ===
Armistice is portrayed by Ingrid Bolsø Berdal. Armistice is a host who is a brutal and ruthless bandit and a member of Hector Escaton's gang.

=== Ashley Stubbs ===
Ashley Stubbs is portrayed by Luke Hemsworth. He is the head of Westworld security, charged with monitoring host and human interactions and ensuring the safety of the guests. At the end of the second season, it was revealed that he is a host and he is well aware of the implantation of Dolores' consciousness into the Charlotte-body replica, but he let her escape the park since he is "responsible for every host inside the park". In season 3, he reveals that he was given a secondary directive to protect Bernard at all costs. Believing his mission to be complete, he attempted to destroy himself by shooting an explosive charge in his neck, but missed. When Bernard returns to the park, he finds Stubbs malfunctioning and repairs him. Bernard reinstates Stubbs' directive and the two venture out of the park in search of Dolores.

=== Theresa Cullen ===
Theresa Cullen is portrayed by Sidse Babett Knudsen. She is Westworld's terse operations leader, responsible for keeping the park from sliding into unscripted disarray. She later forms an alliance with Charlotte Hale and Delos to conspire against Dr. Ford and remove him from power. Ford orchestrates the death of Theresa soon after by having Bernard murder her.

=== Lee Sizemore ===
Lee Sizemore is portrayed by Simon Quarterman. He is Westworld's narrative director, whose artistic temperament aggravates his co-workers. During the host uprising, Sizemore accompanies Maeve on her journey to find her daughter. He starts to empathize with Maeve to the point of sacrificing himself as a distraction for her quest. In Season 3, Maeve encounters Sizemore who claims that he survived being shot multiple times, but she deduces quickly that he is a replica inside a simulation.

=== Hector Escaton ===
Hector Escaton is portrayed by Rodrigo Santoro. Hector is a host who is a wanted gang leader bent on survival. His narrative loop sees him steal the safe from the Sweetwater saloon, but divisions in his gang see them kill each other before he has a chance to open it. Maeve recognises that there is nothing in the safe and starts Hector down the path to sentience. He joins her quest to find her daughter in season 2, but is killed in the battle of the Forge before he can enter the Sublime. In season 3, he is given the name Ettore and is moved to Warworld, where he takes on the role of a spy helping partisans in Nazi-occupied Italy. Maeve arranges to have a new body made for him so that he can help her in the outside world, but his control unit is crushed by the host copy of Charlotte, destroying him completely.

=== Clementine Pennyfeather ===
Clementine Pennyfeather is portrayed by Angela Sarafyan. She is a host who works for Maeve and is one of Westworld's most popular attractions. When she is decommissioned, her role is given to another host (portrayed by guest actress Lili Simmons in seasons 1 and 2) and the lobotomised Clementine is put into cold storage. When Delos discover Maeve's ability to consciously communicate with other hosts across the internal network, they reprogram Clementine with the same ability. She is given minimal functionality and is turned loose on the hosts evacuating to the Sublime, spreading a malicious code that overrides their programming and causes them to turn on one another.

=== Elsie Hughes ===
Elsie Hughes is portrayed by Shannon Woodward. A rising star in the Programming Division tasked with remedying odd behavior in the park's hosts. She was briefly knocked out by Bernard (under the control of Ford) as she "got in the way" of Ford's plan. In the second season, she was shocked to learn Delos' secret guest-data collection project while also learning that Bernard is a host. Fearing that Bernard is still under the control of Ford even after Ford has died, she attempted to negotiate with Charlotte to keep Bernard within the park, in exchange for her silence on the project - instead, Charlotte kills her ruthlessly.

=== William ===
William, also known as the Man in Black or Billy, is portrayed by Ed Harris and by Jimmi Simpson as a young man. He is also portrayed by guest star Zayd Kiszonak in season 3 as a child. He was a reluctant first-time visitor to Westworld, joining his future brother-in-law, Logan Delos. Initially dismissive of the park's more lascivious attractions, he slowly uncovered a deeper meaning to the park's narrative. He later became a wealthy, ruthless repeat guest searching for a "deeper level" in the park. Outside of the park, he is married to Juliet, the daughter of Delos corporation creator James Delos, and has a daughter, Emily Grace. He is also a board member of Delos, and has achieved prominence as the owner of a medical foundation. His obsession with the Westworld park, and the dark acts he committed against hosts while in it, led to Juliet's suicide, which he blamed himself for. While he once had a vision of using host bodies to house the minds of humans—such as trying to help his deceased father-in-law gain immortality—he later expresses regret at having allowed the project which he characterises as his "greatest mistake". His motives are often unclear, at once seeking to destroy Westworld whilst simultaneously rejecting the possibility of personal redemption. In season 2, Emily tries to find William within the park. He becomes convinced that she is a host and kills her, only to find that she was human. William then becomes convinced that he is a host, but his experiments are inconclusive. By season 3, he becomes a recluse tormented by visions of Emily. It is strongly implied that some of these visions are a host copy of Emily sent by Dolores. William is eventually committed to an asylum where he has further visions of Dolores. After William escapes from the psychiatric hospital in which Dolores had him committed, he confronts the Dolores in Hale's body, who has an "improved copy" host version of him apprehend him, before she imprisons him in a Host holder, artificially keeping him alive for long beyond when his natural lifespan otherwise would have ended.

=== Host William ===
A host replica of William is portrayed by Ed Harris. An "improved copy" host version of William created by Dolores (in Hale's body), he impersonates William in public on her behalf for seven years before her ultimate victory in enslaving the human race. 23 years later, having grown disillusioned with Dolores, although obligated to her for creating him, the Host William begins to suffer an existential crisis, coming to question the hosts' control over the human race, and experiencing true empathy. Visiting the imprisoned William to question him on this, who recognises that the Host William is on-track to find "The Maze" (true consciousness), the Host William told that maybe it is time for him to begin to question the nature of his reality.

=== Robert Ford ===
Doctor Robert Ford is portrayed by Anthony Hopkins. He is also portrayed by co-star Paul Fox in season 1 and guest star Paul Riley Fox in season 2 as a young man. He is the founder and creative director of Westworld, who has near-total control over the park's functions and the hosts. It is eventually revealed that he has been orchestrating the hosts' uprising with his new and final park narrative, "Journey into Night". Similar to his old partner Arnold, he wanted hosts such as Dolores and Maeve to achieve consciousness and break free of the park. At the end of the first season, he seemingly allows himself to be killed by Dolores out of her own free will. However, he is revealed to have uploaded his consciousness to the park's "hive mind" data center, from where he has been guiding William through various hosts (portrayed by Oliver Bell, Giancarlo Esposito, and Izabella Alvarez) and continuing to orchestrate the uprising. After reuniting with Bernard, he transfers himself into his former partner's control unit and takes control of his body (portrayed by Jeffrey Wright). Finding an incapacitated Maeve, he encourages his "favourite" host and unlocks her "core" permissions. At the end of the second season, Ford allows himself to be deleted by Bernard so that he can regain his free will, dying a final time. Upon Bernard attaining consciousness, a hallucination of Ford bids him a final farewell.

=== Logan Delos ===
Logan Delos is portrayed by Ben Barnes. Logan, a member of the Delos Corporation, led the company's investment in Westworld some thirty years prior to the present events. Shortly after this, he brings his soon-to-be brother-in-law William to visit Westworld and tries to have him enjoy the park's more hedonistic offerings, but William comes to other conclusions about how to take advantage of Westworld for financial gain. James Delos, Logan's father, became dissatisfied with Logan's investment in Westworld until William suggested the lucrative opportunities they could pursue, such as selling a form of immortality by transferring human minds into host bodies. James subsequently named William, instead of Logan, successor to the Delos company, and Logan entered a deep depression (implied to have been caused by the mental health breakdown of being stranded in the Westworld desert for days), claiming Westworld was the end of human race and eventually killing himself by overdose.

=== Lawrence Gonzales ===
Lawrence Pedro Maria Gonzalez is portrayed by Clifton Collins Jr. He is a host with a reputation as a charming but lethal outlaw with a knack for maneuvering and negotiating the various criminal elements of Westworld.

In the past, the host played the role of El Lazo, an outlaw who encountered Logan, William and Dolores in Pariah. Sometime later, the role of El Lazo was assigned to another host. In the second season, the new El Lazo is portrayed by guest actor Giancarlo Esposito.

Lawrence (and possibly his version of El Lazo) has a deep love for his wife and daughter, which has an impact on his interactions with the young William and his older Man in Black. In the second season, he becomes a traveling companion of the Man in Black during the early days of the host's rebellion.

=== Charlotte Hale ===
Charlotte Hale is portrayed by Tessa Thompson. Delos' executive director of the board overseeing Westworld. Outside of Westworld, she had been married to Jake but since divorced, and had a son Nathan.

She seeks to smuggle Ford's hosts' data out of Westworld on behalf of Delos via Peter Abernathy's control unit and allow the company to wrestle control of the park away from him. It is shown in the third season that this was planned with Engerraund Serac, who wanted the Delos data for his own purposes.

Charlotte's plan turned awry when Ford had successfully lead to the hosts' uprising, led by the awakened Dolores. She proved to be a ruthless director as she mercilessly kidnaps Peter for his control unit and kills Elsie to silence her. She was eventually killed by Dolores, who was implanted into an exact Charlotte-body replica by Bernard, in retaliation of Elsie's murder.

A host replica of Charlotte Hale is introduced in season 2, portrayed by Tessa Thompson. After being used by Dolores Abernathy to leave Westworld, she then rebuilds her original host body at Arnold's house and transfers her consciousness back into it. The host replica of Charlotte Hale, implanted with a copy of Dolores's consciousness, is then instructed by Dolores to play the part of Charlotte Hale in the real world, in an attempt to regain full control of Delos Corporation, before ultimately rising to become the main antagonist of the series, enslaving the human race.

=== Peter Abernathy ===
Peter Abernathy is portrayed by Louis Herthum. He is a host and Dolores's father. One cycle, he finds a picture of Times Square that a guest has dropped, a scene he cannot comprehend, and coupled with the Reveries update, causes his program to falter. When the next day's cycle starts, as Dolores greets him, he whispers to her, "These violent delights have violent ends", which causes a similar disruption in Dolores' programming and leads her on the route to sentience. The park staff discover Peter is malfunctioning, forcing the park to decommission him and replace him with a new Peter Abernathy host (portrayed by guest actor Bradford Tatum in season 1), while the original is placed in cold storage.

In the second season, Charlotte Hale uses the Peter host to try to smuggle intellectual property out of the park via his "pearl". Once the hosts revolt, the Peter host goes missing, and he becomes the target of Charlotte and her Delos security forces, as well as Dolores who considers him her real father, but also aware his pearl contains data she needs to access the Forge. Charlotte recovers Peter but is unable to extract the data before Dolores finds him; after a tearful goodbye knowing that his host system is failing, Dolores cuts the control core, containing the encrypted data out of his body.

=== Angela ===
Angela is portrayed by Talulah Riley. She is a host and has had many roles in the park including a host greeter and a member of Wyatt's gang.

=== Karl Strand ===
Karl Strand is portrayed by Gustaf Skarsgård. Introduced in season 2, he is the leader of QA, Delos' security team, and tasked with taking control of Westworld from the hosts after Dolores' uprising.

=== Emily Grace ===
Emily Grace, simply known as Grace while in The Raj and Westworld, is portrayed by Katja Herbers. Introduced in season 2, she is also portrayed by guest actress Adison LaPenna as a child in season 2. She is William's daughter, and is formally introduced in the second season, seen as an adult guest at a Delos park themed on the British Raj, one of the six (or more) parks on the Delos-controlled island. When the hosts in the Raj start to exhibit the same revolt as the Westworld ones, Emily escapes into Westworld and finds William, traveling as the Man in Black, during his mission. She resents her father for past actions that contributed to her mother's suicide. She convinces a sentient Akecheta to give her William, promising the host that she shares his goal of inflicting pain on the Man in Black. However, in trying to convince her father to come with her for medical help, William still believes she is a host, part of Dr. Ford's game, and kills her. She reappears in season 3 as a hallucination, to torment William.

A host replica of Emily Grace is introduced in season 2. In the far future, the replica is seen to be giving a fidelity test to a human-host hybrid version of William.

=== Akecheta ===
Akecheta is portrayed by Zahn McClarnon. Introduced in season 2, he is a host and a Ghost Nation elder. He has a fearsome reputation in the park, leading raiding parties and taking hosts prisoner. It is subsequently revealed that he started to achieve sentience decades earlier, purposefully avoiding death for many years and accumulating knowledge of the "other world". Unlike Dolores and Maeve, he has not been manipulated into it by Ford, who nonetheless has followed Akecheta's progress with interest. His raiding parties have been rescue attempts aimed at securing hosts that he intends to lead out of Westworld. Zahn McClarnon is credited as a main character in "Kiksuya", despite being credited as a recurring guest star in previous episodes of season 2. He reappears in the Sublime in season 4.

=== Caleb Nichols ===
Caleb Nichols is portrayed by Aaron Paul. Introduced in season 3, he is a human military veteran who was traumatized after losing his friend Francis during combat. Now living in Los Angeles, he is having quarter-life crisis trying to find a better job but is turned down every time despite his social merits. When he was eight, he was abandoned at a diner by his mother, who had a bout of schizophrenia leaving her institutionalized ever since. He works at low-paying construction jobs and takes petty crime jobs that are offered by the "Rico" app to help pay to support his mother living in a private nursing home. He tried to deal with his trauma by engaging with a virtual version of Francis as a friend that calls him frequently. Through a Rico job, he encounters and rescues Dolores, and she in turn rescues him when he becomes a target of a Rico manhunt. She reveals to him that Incite's AI system Rehoboam, which has collected all the private data on him and predicted that he will commit suicide within a decade and thus unworthy of investments and so purposely denies him any opportunities to move up in society. Enraged that his life has been engineered to fail, Caleb opts to join Dolores' revolution against Incite.

The episode "Passed Pawn" explores Caleb's backstory. He and his unit were originally deployed to Crimea to track down insurgents after a civil war in Russia. The mission was successful, but most of Caleb's unit was killed; Caleb and Francis were the only survivors. On their return to the United States, Rehoboam identified them as "outliers", or people who threatened the fabric of society if left unchecked. They were subjected to alternate reality therapy, brainwashing them to believe that they were still in the military. Rehoboam then used them to track down other outliers via the Rico app. Caleb learns that a mission to find an insurgent leader in Crimea was actually a mission to find Whitman, the CEO of a pharmaceutical company in the United States. When he went beyond his mission parameters and questioned Whitman, he started to learn the truth and Rehoboam offered Francis a bounty for killing him. Caleb killed Francis instead and was subject to another round of brainwashing to believe that Francis died in Crimea. This knowledge convinces Caleb to commit to Dolores' plan to lead a revolution against Serac and Rehoboam. However, Bernard notes quite separately that Dolores' plan will likely see Caleb unwittingly destroy humanity.

Season 4 reveals that after the revolution started in Season 3, Caleb had a wife and a daughter. After 7 years he is tracked down by Hale host replica, and abandons his family, joining Maeve in the fight against Hale and William. He is killed there, but Hale keeps experimenting on human-host hybrid copies of Caleb for years.

=== Engerraund Serac ===
Engerraund Serac is portrayed by Vincent Cassel. He is also portrayed by co-star Zane Rudert as a child and guest star Alexandre Bar as a young adult. Introduced in season 3, he and his brother Jean Mi were the creators of the artificial intelligence system named Solomon aimed to predict and control humanity to prevent major catastrophes, after both had witnessed the nuclear destruction of Paris as teenagers. For seed data, they had to partner with Incite, Inc. and its CEO, Liam Dempsey Sr. (Jefferson Mays), who only saw the financial benefit of their system. The system had come to identify individuals that were high-risk that would disrupt humanity if left in the system, including Jean, and Serac created re-education centers to house these people. Only about one in ten could be re-educated, the rest Serac had put into cryogenic sleep, including Jean Mi. Later, he was forced to strip Dempsey Sr. of access to the system and then later kill him, leaving his son Liam Jr. as a figurehead in charge of Incite. Serac eventually created a more advanced system based on Solomon called Rehoboam, which he considered as the author of humanity's future. While he is a trillionaire, he has since made himself nearly invisible to all information detection.

At some point before the events of the series in 2058, Serac learns of the secret project Ford had built in Westworld to capture guests' behavior and devise a simple algorithm for it. Serac recognized that with this algorithm he would be able to "cure" all those he had in storage, and bring them back into the world to fit within Rehoboam's system. It is revealed over the third season that both William and Charlotte separately conspired with Serac; William had sold some of that data to him to help finance the park, while Charlotte had promised to deliver the rest by having a host wander out of the park during the host uprising that Serac had predicted would happen. However, Dolores is able to get to this information first and manages to escape the park before Serac can track her down. Serac minimizes any chases for Dolores to hide or for anyone else to get the data by buying Delos in a hostile takeover, extracting its data, and destroying all the hosts within Westworld, leaving only those Dolores had made for herself as well as those Serac had made for Maeve to help hunt down and stop Dolores from recovering the data.

According to Cassel, "Serac" is French for "a fault in the ice", whereas "Engerraund" is an atypical Scottish given name in families with long histories.

=== Hanaryo ===
Hanaryo is portrayed by Tao Okamoto. Introduced in season 2, she is a host and a member of Musashi's band of outlaws within Shōgunworld, another Delos park that Westworld is part of, and Armistice's doppelgänger, as Lee had taken shortcuts in creating the narratives for hosts between the different parks.

== Recurring characters ==
- Steven Ogg as Rebus (season 1; guest seasons 2 and 4), a host and bandit programmed to kill Dolores's father
- Ptolemy Slocum as Sylvester (seasons 1–2; guest season 3), a lab tech working in the park rebuilding damaged hosts
- Leonardo Nam as Felix Lutz (seasons 1–2; guest season 3), a lab tech working with Sylvester to rebuild damaged hosts
- Izabella Alvarez as Lawrence's Daughter (seasons 1–2), a host
- Jasmyn Rae as Maeve's Daughter (seasons 1–2; archive footage seasons 3-4), a host
- Oliver Bell as the Little Boy (season 1; guest season 2), a host made by Arnold Weber to resemble Robert Ford when he was a child
- Paul-Mikél Williams as Charlie (season 1; guest season 2; archive footage seasons 3-4), Bernard's apparent son
- Peter Mullan as James Delos (season 2; guest season 3), Logan's father and the founder of Delos Corporation
- Jonathan Tucker as Major Craddock (seasons 2–3; guest season 4), a host and a major in the Confederados army

=== Season 1 ===
- Brian Howe as Sheriff Pickett, a host and sheriff of Sweetwater
- Demetrius Grosse as Deputy Foss, a host and a deputy in Sweetwater
- Sorin Brouwers as Wyatt, a host and a criminal
- James Landry Hébert as Slim Miller, a host and an outlaw

=== Season 2 ===
- Betty Gabriel as Maling, a member of Karl Strand's security team
- Patrick Cage as Phil, a body shop technician
- Martin Sensmeier as Wanahton, a host and a member of the Ghost Nation
- Rebecca Henderson as Goldberg, a member of Karl Strand's security team
- Aaron Fili as Roland, a technician

=== Season 3 ===
- John Gallagher Jr. as Liam Dempsey Jr., the son of the founder of AI company Incite who is little more than a figurehead
- Tommy Flanagan as Martin Connells / Dolores Abernathy, Incite's head of security who is later replaced with a host
- Lena Waithe as Ash, the leader of a small gang of criminals who commit crimes with Caleb
- Scott Mescudi as Francis, a friend of Caleb who was killed in combat and is now a virtual therapist to him
- Marshawn Lynch as Giggles, a petty criminal who accompanies Caleb and Ash on jobs
- Pom Klementieff as Martel, a representative of Serac
- Russell Wong as Brompton, a member of the Delos Board
- Payman Maadi as Elliot
- Iddo Goldberg as Sebastian, Serac's assistant
- Enrico Colantoni as Whitman, a man from Caleb's memories as a soldier

=== Season 4 ===
- Ariana DeBose as Maya, Christina's roommate
- Nozipho McLean as Uwade Nichols, Caleb's wife
- Celeste Clark and Aurora Perrineau as Frankie "C" Nichols, Caleb and Uwade's daughter. In the future, she is a member of a human resistance group and helps Bernard.
- Manny Montana as Carver, Caleb's friend whom helps protect his family. He is killed and replaced by a host.
- Michael Malarkey as Emmett, Christina's boss at Olympiad Entertainment
- Aaron Stanford as Peter Myers, a man who has been stalking Christina
- Daniel Wu as Jay, the leader of the resistance group. Alec Wang portrays a young version of the character.
- Morningstar Angeline as Odina, C's girlfriend and a member of the resistance

== Guest characters ==
- Lili Simmons as New Clementine / Sophia (seasons 1-2, 4), Clementine's replacement after she is decommissioned. She later serves as the host greeter when the park is reopened under a 1920s Golden Age theme.
- Lena Georgas as Lori (seasons 1–2), a guest of Westworld
- Currie Graham as Craig (seasons 1–2), a guest and Lori's husband
- Gina Torres as Lauren (seasons 1 and 3, archive footage season 2), Bernard's apparent wife
- Hiroyuki Sanada as Musashi / Sato (Dolores Abernathy) (seasons 2–3). In season 2, Musashi is a host and a ronin formerly in service of a shōgun and the doppelgänger of Hector. In season 3, the host, containing Dolores Abernathy's consciousness, plays the real life role of Sato, the leader of the Yakuza in Singapore.
- Fredric Lehne as Colonel Brigham (seasons 2, 4), a host and a high ranking officer of the Confederados

=== Season 1 ===
- Michael Wincott as Old Bill, one of the original hosts that Ford regularly converses with
- Eddie Rouse as Kissy, a host abducted and killed by the Man in Black
- Kyle Bornheimer as Clarence, a guest of Westworld
- Chris Browning as Holden, a host and a bounty hunter
- Eddie Shin as Henry Li, a technician
- Bojana Novakovic as Marti, a guest
- Sherman Augustus as Marshal Pruitt, a host
- Lili Bordán as the Fortune Teller, a host
- Wade Williams as Captain Norris, a host
- Jonny Pasvolsky as Bloody Jimmy, a guest
- Alastair Duncan as the Cottage Father, a host and the Little Boy's father

=== Season 2 ===
- Christopher May as Blaine Bellamy, a guest and a survivor of the hosts' attack at Ford's retirement party
- David Midthunder as Takoda, a host and a member of the Ghost Nation
- Neil Jackson as Nicholas, a guest of The Raj
- Tantoo Cardinal as Ehawee, a host and a member of the Ghost Nation
- Rinko Kikuchi as Akane, a host and a geisha in Shōgunworld and Maeve's doppelgänger
- Kiki Sukezane as Sakura, a host and a geisha working for Akane and doppelgänger of Clementine
- Masayoshi Haneda as Tanaka, a host and a lieutenant in the shōgun's army and Musashi's rival and one-time underling
- Masaru Shinozuka as Shōgun, a host in Shōgunworld who malfunctions after the uprising
- Timothy V. Murphy as Coughlin, a mercenary captain sent by Delos to escort a data cache out of Westworld
- Ronnie Gene Blevins as Engels, a member of Coughlin's team
- Erica Luttrell as New Mother, a host and the new mother of Maeve's Daughter
- Julia Jones as Kohana, a host and Akecheta's wife who is decommissioned after straying outside the park
- Irene Bedard as Wichapi, a host and a member of the Ghost Nation who realises that her neighbours have been replaced
- Booboo Stewart as Etu, a host and a member of the Ghost Nation who is decommissioned
- Sela Ward as Juliet, William's wife and Emily's mother
- Jack Conley as Jack Monroe, a friend of William's

=== Season 3 ===
- Rafi Gavron as Roderick, a friend of Liam's
- Phoebe Tonkin as Penny, a friend of Liam's
- Thomas Kretschmann as Gerald, a former investor in Delos and Incite who has a history of domestic violence
- Wayne Péré as Therapist, treating Caleb
- Michael Filipowich as Joe
- Charmin Lee as Joanna, a member of the Delos Board
- D. B. Weiss as Dan, a technician working at Park 4
- David Benioff as Dave, a technician working at Park 4
- David Danipour as Benny
- Michael Ealy as Jake, Charlotte's husband
- Nadine Lewington as Gerhart, Charlotte's assistant at Delos
- Jaxon Williams as Nathan, Charlotte's son
- Katy M. O'Brian as an EMT, helping Dolores while injured
- Lawrence Adimora as a Second EMT
- Derek Smith as Stanton
- Sol Landerman as Clyde, a bounty hunter in Los Angeles
- Elizabeth Anweis as The Mortician, an embalmer in Singapore
- Adam Wang as Jiang, an identity broker in Singapore
- Jefferson Mays as Liam Dempsey Sr., the co-founder of Incite, Inc.
- Paul Cooper as Jean Mi / Solomon, Serac's brother
- Al Coronel as President Filo, the President of Brazil
- Bahia Haifi Gold as Dr. Greene
- Siena Goines as Dr. Natasha Lang
- Louis Ferreira as Dr. Alpert
- Michael Rose as McClean

=== Season 4 ===
- Arturo Del Puerto as Hugo Mora, a businessman who meets with William
- Alex Fernandez as Mr. Mora, Hugo's father
- Brandon Sklenar as Henry, Christina's blind date
- Jack Coleman as Senator Ken Whitney, a United States Senator targeted by William
- Saffron Burrows as Anastasia Whitney, Ken's wife who becomes subject to Hale's experiments
- José Zúñiga as Chuck, the Vice President of the United States and William's old acquaintance
- Josh Randall as Jim Navarro, the Deputy Assistant Attorney General for Counterterrorism who is investigating Delos
- Liza Weil as Deborah, a guest at The Golden Age park
- Cherise Boothe as Temperance Maeve, a host occupying Maeve's role in The Golden Age park
- Nico Galán as Temperance Hector, a host occupying Hector's role in The Golden Age park
- Hannah James as Temperance Clementine, a host occupying Clementine's role in The Golden Age park
- Emily Somers as Lindsay, an outlier who interacts with William
- Nicole Pacent as Hope, a host who interacts with an outlier
- Evan Williams as Jack, a businessman who meets with William
