= Mercury Plains =

- Directed by: Charles Burmeister
- Written by: Charles Burmeister
- Produced by: Houston Hill; Eric Watson
- Starring: Scott Eastwood; Angela Sarafyan; Nick Chinlund; Justin Arnold
- Cinematography: Philip Roy
- Edited by: Christopher Rucinski
- Music by: Austin Wintory
- Production company: Number 5 Films
- Distributed by: Lionsgate Home Entertainment
- Release date: January 5, 2016 (US)
- Running time: 102 minutes
- Country: United States
- Language: English

Mercury Plains is a 2016 American action drama film directed by Charles Burmeister and starring Scott Eastwood, Angela Sarafyan, and Nick Chinlund. Grindstone Entertainment Group acquired the US rights to the film, and it was distributed by Lionsgate Home Entertainment. Eastwood stars as an American drifter hired in Mexico to fight drug cartels.

== Plot ==
Mitch Davis, unhappy with his life and seeing no prospects for work, leaves with a friend for a trip to Mexico. After getting a prostitute in a bar, Mitch's friend leaves without paying. When Mitch refuses to pay his friend's debt to the pimp, he is beaten and robbed. Another American, Jesse, buys him a meal. As they talk, Jesse offers him a job working for a man known as the Captain, an American veteran who runs a paramilitary vigilante group that targets the Mexican cartels. Mitch answers noncommittally and listens to the Captain's recruitment speech. The Captain, recognizing his ordinary speech that emphasizes glory and power will not appeal to Mitch, flatly offers him $5000. Mitch at first declines but reconsiders after the Captain points out that anyone who comes to Mexico on a lark must be leaving behind an even worse situation than what he offers.

At the Captain's compound, Mitch meets Camarillo, the Captain's second in command; Alyssa, the Captain's girlfriend; Paul, a surly skinhead; Benito, a young Mexican thief; and several other young recruits, including the Captain's teenage son, Jack. The Captain's first job has them build a ditch. When Benito is bitten by a scorpion, Mitch protests when Camarillo forces him back to work. Camarillo orders Paul to beat Mitch. When Mitch turns out to be a competent fighter, Camarillo knocks him out with a Taser. Mitch wakes in a thick wooden box, where he is given limited rations. After being stuck there for a day, Mitch escapes by knocking loose a hinged slot and using it to dig a tunnel. Impressed with his ingenuity, the Captain allows him to rejoin the others as they eat. Mitch also impresses Alyssa, who flirts with him when the Captain is not around. The two later have sex.

Speaking privately with Mitch, the Captain says Mitch has become his favorite recruit, as Mitch reminds the Captain of himself. The Captain explains his philosophy: lawlessness allows common men to become great, though they must then combat the lawlessness to retain their power. The Captain point blank asks Mitch if he is having sex with Alyssa, which Mitch denies, satisfying the Captain. Their first mission is to rob a drug runner named Brad. After kidnapping him, they find no drugs on Brad. When Brad goes for Paul's gun, Paul accidentally shoots Brad in the struggle. Mitch insists they take Brad with them, but Camarillo orders them to leave him for dead. Before they leave, Benito steals Brad's expensive shirt. When they get back to the compound, Benito, being illiterate, has Mitch read a letter he found in the shirt. In it, Brad's parents tell him they love him and support any decision he makes about staying in Mexico.

With the money stolen from Brad's credit cards, they purchase more guns. Dressed as FBI agents, they stop a cartel car and attempt to restrain them. When the cartel men become suspicious, a gunfight ensues, causing Jesse's death. The next hit turns out to be federal police officers. Mitch tries to abort the mission, but the others continue. Paul is killed in the resulting fight, but Mitch recovers a suitcase full of cash from the federales' car. Shortly after they return to the compound, the police raid it. Mitch, the Captain, and Camarillo escape in Mitch's car together. When Camarillo later reads them a Mexican newspaper, the Captain learns Jack died during the fight, and he deduces Benito was a police informer. They pick up Benito, drive to a secluded area, and the Captain drags Benito out of the car. Mitch at first does nothing, but then strangles Camarillo when he decides that he has to do something to prevent what is about to happen. After helplessly watching the Captain kill Benito, Mitch flees with the money.

The two men wound each other, and after a long chase, the Captain finally catches up to Mitch, who has crossed most of the desert on foot trying to get back to the States. Further elucidating on his philosophy, the Captain says war is like love and allows men to express themselves. As he prepares to kill Mitch, Mitch surprises him with a small, single-shot pistol favored by Benito. After killing the Captain, Mitch returns to the city, buys new clothes to replace his bloody and torn rags, and visits Brad's parents. He secretly leaves them the money stolen from the federales.

== Cast ==
- Scott Eastwood as Mitch Davis
- Angela Sarafyan as Alyssa
- Nick Chinlund as The Captain
- Justin Arnold as Paul
- Andy Garcia as Benito
- Joe Gonzales as Bodyguard
- Brinlee Grace as Beth
- Mark Hanson as Ron
- Jorge A. Jimenez as Camarillo
- Karina Junker as Tatiana Gomez
- Justin Park as Jesse
- Keith Poulson as Naylor
- Nicholas Pullara as Jack
- Steven Pritchard as Brad

== Reception ==
John Noonan of Filmink called it "a rather cold and sluggish watch". Though Noonan complimented Chinlund, who he said was reminiscent of Dennis Hopper and Ed Harris, Noonan said Eastwood was forced to mimic his father's style too much. Writing at DVD Talk, Tyler Foster rated it 3.5/5 stars and called it "generally well-made" film with a good performance from Eastwood.
