= Angela Sarafyan =

Armenian-American actress

- Անժելա Սարաֆյան
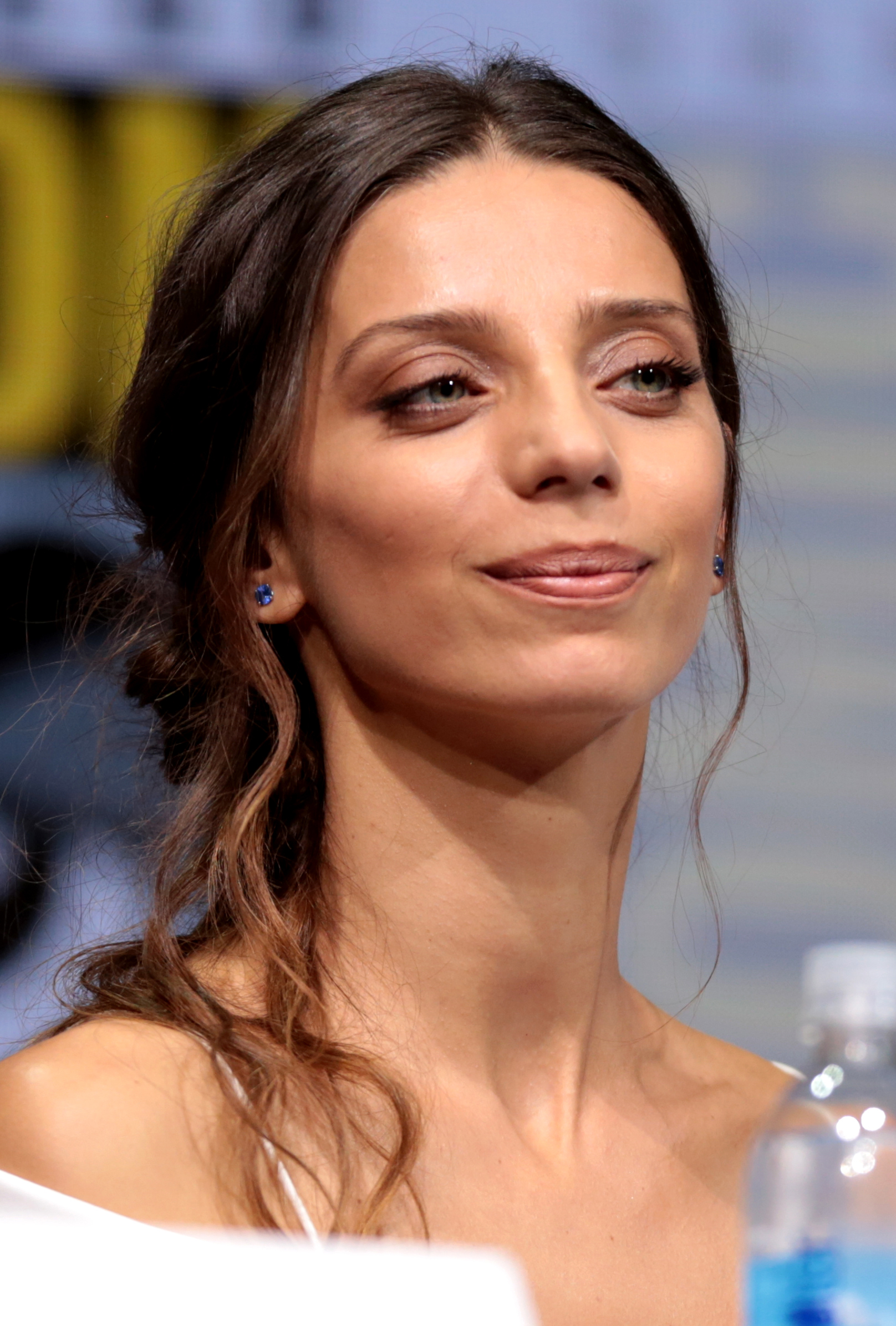
- Sarafyan at the 2017 San Diego Comic-Con
- Born: Yerevan, Armenian SSR, Soviet Union
- Other name: Angela Sarafian
- Occupation: Actress
- Years active: 2000–present

Angela Sarafyan (Armenian: Անժելա Սարաֆյան), sometimes credited as Angela Sarafian, is an Armenian-American actress. Her film credits include On the Doll (2007), A Beautiful Life (2008), A Good Old Fashioned Orgy (2011) and Lost & Found in Armenia (2012). She portrayed Clementine Pennyfeather in the television series Westworld (2016–22) and Lara, Superman's mother, in the film Superman (2025).

== Early life ==
Angela was born in Yerevan, Armenian SSR, Soviet Union, eight years before Armenia regained its independence. When she was four, she moved with her parents – actor Grigor Sarafyan and her painter mother – to the United States, settling in Los Angeles. She studied ballet and played piano as a child. She attended Francisco Bravo Medical Magnet High School in Boyle Heights, Los Angeles.

== Career ==
=== 2000–2008: early work ===
Sarafyan's first acting role was on the CBS legal drama Judging Amy in the episode "Culture Clash" in 2000. Afterwards, she made a cameo in the music video for Britney Spears' song "Stronger". Sarafyan later made a guest appearance on Buffy the Vampire Slayer, and starred in the television film Paranormal Girl in 2002. She made her film debut (though uncredited) in the 2004 comedy-drama The Last Run.

Sarafyan continued with her work on television with roles on The Shield, The Division, Wanted, South of Nowhere, 24, CSI: NY, Lincoln Heights, Cold Case, In Plain Sight, and The Mentalist. She also had roles in the 2007 films Kabluey and On the Doll. In 2008, Sarafyan starred in her first lead role as Maggie in the drama film A Beautiful Life opposite Jesse Garcia. She also contributed to a minor role as Mary in The Informers.

=== 2009–2015: mainstream recognition ===
In 2009, Sarafyan starred in the films Repo Chick and Love Hurts, and the television series Eastwick. She also had a recurring role on the web series Hot Sluts and Sex Ed: The Series. In 2010, she portrayed Samantha Evans on the Fox series The Good Guys. She also appeared on Childrens Hospital.

In 2011, Sarafyan starred in A Good Old Fashioned Orgy as Willow Talbot, the girlfriend of Martin Starr's character. She also appeared in the sixth season finale of Criminal Minds and the ninth episode of the second season of Nikita. Sarafyan went on to appear in The Twilight Saga: Breaking Dawn – Part 2 as Egyptian vampire Tia, the mate of vampire Benjamin, and as Ani in Lost & Found in Armenia in 2012. In 2013, Sarafyan played a minor role in The Immigrant as Marion Cotillard's character's sister. She also appeared in Paranoia featuring Liam Hemsworth, Gary Oldman, Amber Heard, and Harrison Ford. The film bombed at the box office and received negative reviews from critics.

In 2015, Sarafyan co-starred as the wife of Simon Abkarian's character in the psychological thriller 1915. The film follows a mysterious director staging a play to bring the ghosts of a forgotten tragedy back to life on the 100th anniversary of the Armenian genocide. She also co-starred with Luke Bracey, Dustin Milligan, and Emily Meade in the comedy Me Him Her. Between 2014 and 2015, Sarafyan appeared on the series Blue Bloods and American Horror Story's Freak Show season.

=== 2016–2022: Westworld ===
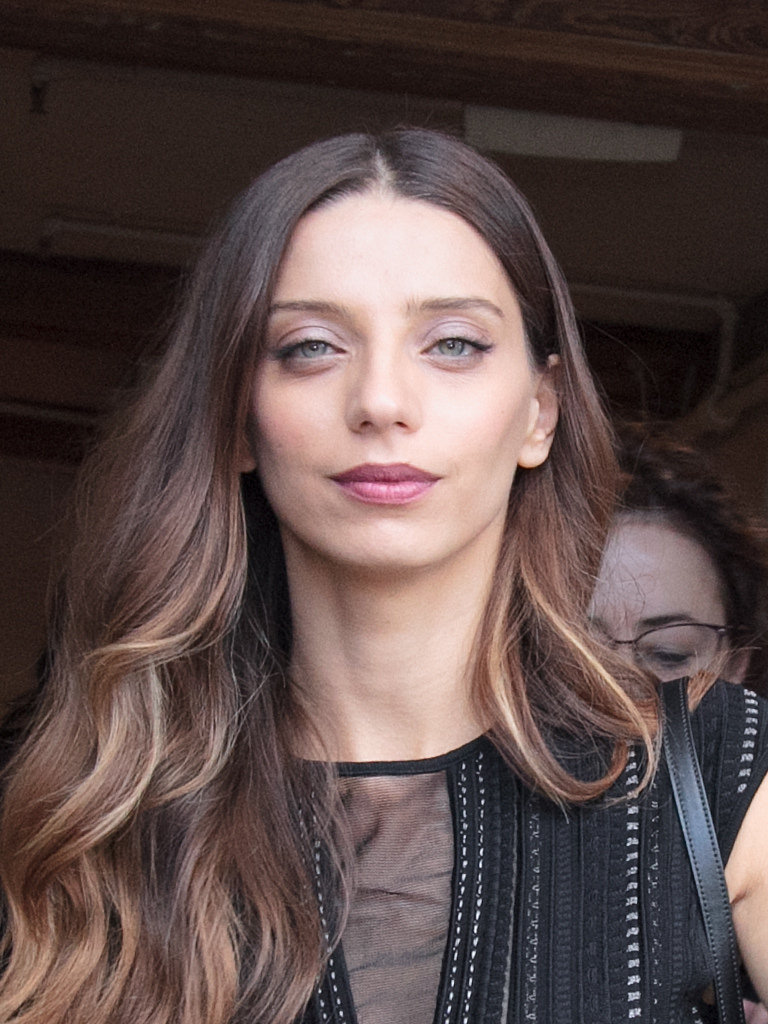
Sarafyan at Toronto International Film Festival 2016

In 2016, Sarafyan appeared as Maral in the epic historical war drama The Promise. The film starred Oscar Isaac, Charlotte Le Bon and Christian Bale and follows a love triangle that develops between an Armenian medical student, an American journalist, and an Armenian-born woman raised in France, immediately before and during the Armenian genocide. She also co-starred with Scott Eastwood in Mercury Plains.

From 2016 to 2022, Sarafyan starred as Clementine Pennyfeather on the HBO science-fiction series Westworld. The role earned Sarafyan a nomination at the 23rd Screen Actors Guild Awards for Outstanding Performance by an Ensemble in a Drama Series with her co-stars.

Following Westworld, Sarafyan received acclaim for her role in the 2018 short film Pin-Up, winning awards at three film festivals for her performance. She starred as the lead role of Francesca in the 2018 film We Are Boats. In 2019, Sarafyan played a supporting role as Joanna in the Netflix biographical thriller Extremely Wicked, Shockingly Evil and Vile starring Zac Efron and Lily Collins, and as Max in the video game Telling Lies. She also had a role on an episode of the horror series Into the Dark. In 2020, she appeared in Caged opposite Edi Gathegi, Melora Hardin, and Tony Amendola.

In 2021, Sarafyan contributed to a supporting role in Reminiscence starring Hugh Jackman, Rebecca Ferguson, and Westworld co-star Thandiwe Newton. She also had roles in King Knight and A House on the Bayou.

=== 2023–present: continued work ===
In 2023, Safaryan participated in Armenian Film Society's Armenian Women in Film and Entertainment panel discussion.

Sarafyan's post-Westworld roles were in 2023's Pet Shop Days and 2024's Junk. In March 2024, Sarafyan was announced to have been cast in the action thriller G20 produced by and starring Viola Davis.

In 2025, Safaryan had a cameo appearance as Lara, Superman's mother, in the DC Universe film Superman.

== Filmography ==
Key
†	Denotes films that have not yet been released

=== Film ===
Year	Title	Role	Notes
2004	The Last Run	Lauren	
2005	Halfway Decent	Liberty Edwards	
2007	Kabluey	Ramona	
2007	On the Doll	Tara	
2008	A Beautiful Life	Maggie	
2008	The Informers	Mary	
2009	Half Truth	Trig	Short film
2009	Repo Chick	Giggli	
2009	Love Hurts	Layla	
2009	Velvet	Beatrice	Short film
2009	Foolishly Seeking True Love	Belle	Short film
2011	American Animal	Not Blonde Angela	
2011	A Good Old Fashioned Orgy	Willow Talbot	
2012	Vampire Riderz	Lala	
2012	Drift		Short film
2012	The Twilight Saga: Breaking Dawn – Part 2	Tia	
2012	Lost & Found in Armenia	Ani	
2013	Noise Matters	Sandy	
2013	The Immigrant	Magda Cybulska	
2013	Paranoia	Allison	
2014	Night Vet	Franny & Zoey	Short film
2014	Never	Rachel	
2015	1915	Angela	
2015	Me Him Her	Heather	
2015	Me You and Five Bucks	Pam	
2015	Blackbird	Angel	Short film
2016	Mercury Plains	Alyssa	
2016	The Promise	Maral	
2018	We Are Boats	Francesca	
2018	Pin-Up	Sunny	Short film
2019	Extremely Wicked, Shockingly Evil and Vile	Joanna	
2019	A Nasty Piece of Work	Tatum	
2019	Where Are You	Cassandra	
2020	Caged	Amber Reid	
2021	Reminiscence	Elsa Carine	
2021	King Knight	Willow	
2021	A House on the Bayou	Jessica Chambers	
2022	The Ray	Maggie	
2023	Hail Mary	Gabrielle	
2023	Pet Shop Days	Jenna	
2024	Junk	Record Store Woman	
2025	G20	Quoll	
2025	Superman	Lara Lor-Van	
2025	Billy Knight	Blake	

=== Television ===
Year	Title	Role	Notes
2000	Judging Amy	Aisha Al-Jamal	Episode: "Culture Clash"
2002	Buffy the Vampire Slayer	Lori	Episode: "Him"
2002	Paranormal Girl	Crystal	Television film
2004	The Shield	Sosi	Episode: "All In"
2004	The Division	Madison Grant	Episodes: "Zero Tolerance: Parts 1 & 2"
2005	Wanted	Natalia	Episode: "Sex Pistols"
2006	South of Nowhere	Paige	Episode: "Say It Ain't So, Spencer"
2006	24	Inessa Kovalevsky	Episode: "Day 5: 1:00 p.m.-2:00 p.m."
2006	CSI: NY	Sara Jackson	Episode: "Open and Shut"
2007	Lincoln Heights	Opal Woodford	Episode: "Baby Doe"
2007	Cold Case	Philippa 'Phil' Abruzzi (1919)	Episode: "Torn"
2008	In Plain Sight	Tasha Turischeva	Episodes: Pilot, "To Serge with Love"
2008	The Mentalist	Adrianna Jonovic	Episode: "Ladies in Red"
2008	Ernesto	Sydney	Television film
2009	Hot Sluts	Helena / Alena	Recurring role
2009	Eastwick	Jenna	Episode: "Red Ants and Widows"
2009	Floored and Lifted	Jade	Episode: "Merde"
2010	Childrens Hospital	Olga	Episode: "Give a Painted Brother a Break"
2010	The Good Guys	Samantha Evans	Main role
2011	Criminal Minds	Lucy	Episode: "Supply and Demand"
2011	Nikita	Oksana	Episode: "Fair Trade"
2012	Let's Big Happy	Olive	Main role
2012	Law & Order: Special Victims Unit	Anna	Episode: "Acceptable Loss"
2013	I Am Victor	Cucumber	Television film
2014	Blue Bloods	Frannie Ferguson	Episode: "Custody Battle"
2015	American Horror Story: Freak Show	Alice	Episodes: "Magical Thinking", "Show Stoppers"
2016–2022	Westworld	Clementine Pennyfeather	Main role
2019	Into the Dark	Tatum	Episode: "A Nasty Piece of Work"
2026	CIA	Toni Napier	2 episodes
2026	Dark Matter	Maria	Episode: "Love and Be Loved"
TBA	El Gato †	Elisa Kazanjian	Main role

=== Video games ===
Year	Title	Role	Notes
2019	Telling Lies	Max	

=== Music videos ===
Year	Artists	Song	Notes
2000	Celine Dion	"I Want You to Need Me"	Unreleased
2000	Britney Spears	"Stronger"	
2017	Vance Joy	"Lay It On Me"	

=== Web ===
Year	Title	Role	Notes
2009	Sex Ed: The Series	Stormy	Web series

== Awards and nominations ==
Year	Ceremony	Result	Award	Title	Refs
2017	23rd Screen Actors Guild Awards	Nominated	Outstanding Performance by an Ensemble in a Drama Series (shared with the cast)	Westworld	
2018	International Independent Film Awards	Won	Best Actress In A Supporting Role – Platinum Level	Pin-Up	
2018	IndieFEST Film Awards	Won	Best Supporting Actress	Pin-Up	
2018	Global Film Festival Awards	Won	Best Supporting Actress	Pin-Up	
