= Matthew Temple (filmmaker) =

American filmmaker

Matthew C. Temple is an American filmmaker, writer and creative coach. While still in college in Vermont, he produced his first film, Senses of Place, which went on to win a Silver Remi award from World Fest Houston, a nomination for Best Independent Film at the Ohio Independent Film Festival, and later picked up for distribution by FilmBuff.

== Biography ==
Temple was born in Los Angeles, CA, where he lived until the age of nine, when his father was offered a job in Denver, CO. Four years later he moved to San Cristobal, Chiapas, Mexico, then Cullowhee, NC, Santa Rosa, CA, and Goettingen, Germany before graduating from Summerfield Waldorf School in 1995. After high school, Temple formed an a cappella group, Voicewell, and spent the following spring and summer hitchhiking through Europe. At the age of 19, he had a daughter and chose to postpone college.

In 2001, Temple wrote and produced his first feature film, Senses of Place, while still an undergraduate at Marlboro College. Shot on super 16mm film, the film went on to play at several film festivals, winning a Remi Award at WorldFest Houston and Best of the Fest at the Lake Placid Film Forum and was eventually distributed by FilmBuff. Temple received his Bachelor of Arts degree from Marlboro College. In 2006, he returned to Los Angeles and shortly after was cast in his first feature film, Animals, with Naveen Andrews, Marc Blucas and Nicki Aycox.

In 2007, Temple began working with producers Bill Borden and Barry Rosenbush, as part of the musical team and music supervisor on The American Mall, an MTV co-production, and First Love: It's the Music, a Columbia Pictures local language production in Russia. He also associate produced the latter. In 2010 Temple was cast in Jonah Hex with Josh Brolin and went on to star in Chillerama with Joel David Moore and Kane Hodder. He also appeared in L.A. Paranormal, 8213: Gacy House, an Asylum Picture, and Crescendo by Alonso Alvarez Barredo.

Temple served as VP of Production and Development for Mili Pictures, in Santa Monica, CA. He has produced several independent feature films, including, The Advocate, directed by Tamas Harangi, the genre thriller Caged with Edi Gathegi, Melora Hardin and Angela Sarafyan, directed by Aaron Fjellman. In 2019 Vertical Entertainment released his documentary feature film, Hardball: The Girls of Summer. In January, 2021, Shout! Factory released Caged.

In 2018, Temple got rid of his belongings and moved to Kenya with his fiancée. He is the founder of the non-profit organization NetworkM, now called WeStrive.org

== Filmography ==
=== Filmmaker ===
Year	Title	Position	Notes
2021	Caged	Producer	
2019	Hardball: The Girls of Summer	Director/Writer/Producer	Documentary Feature
2018	Pin-Up	Executive Producer	short form
2017	Veritas Vos Liberabit	Director/Writer/Producer	short form
2017	Throne of Elves	Co-Producer	Animated Feature Films
2017	Cars of Newport Car Museum	Director/Writer/Producer	documentary shorts
2015	DWAI: Don't Worry About It	Director/Producer	short form
2014	Dragon Nest: Warriors' Dawn	Co-Producer	Animated Feature Film
2014	Crossroads	Producer	
2013	Animal Cookies	Director/Writer/Producer	short form; Winner: Best Family Film at Honolulu Film Awards
2013	The Advocate	Producer	
2011	The Luckiest Man Alive	Director/Writer/Producer	short form
2011	L.A. Paranormal	Writer/Producer	Nominated Best Picture at Idyllwild Film Fest
2009	First Love: It's the Music	Associate Producer	
2008	The American Mall	Music Supervisor	Example
2004	Senses of Place	Writer/Producer	Winner: Silver Remi at World Fest Houston

=== Actor ===
Year	Title	Roll	Notes
2011	Chillerama	Franz	
2011	L.A. Paranormal	Max	
2011	The Luckiest Man Alive	Jon	
2011	Crescendo	Johann von Beethoven	
2010	8213: Gacy House	Robbie	
2010	Jonah Hex	Telegrapher	
2009	Mission Hollywood	Jim	RTL German TV
2008	Animals	Frat Boy	
