= 8213: Gacy House =

8213: Gacy House/Paranormal Entity 2
- DVD cover
- Directed by: Anthony Fankhauser
- Written by: Anthony Fankhauser
- Produced by: David Michael Latt; David Rimawi; Paul Bales
- Starring: Jim Lewis; Matthew Temple; Michael Gaglio; Brett A. Newton; Diana Terranova; Sylvia Panacione; Rachel Riley
- Cinematography: Matt Hoelfer
- Music by: Chris Ridenhour (trailer only)
- Distributed by: The Asylum
- Release date: September 28, 2010
- Running time: 90 minutes
- Country: United States
- Language: English

8213: Gacy House, or Paranormal Entity 2: Gacy House, is a 2010 American "found footage" horror film written and directed by Anthony Fankhauser and distributed by The Asylum. It is a mockbuster of the film Paranormal Activity 2.

== Plot ==
A group of paranormal investigators enter the abandoned home of serial killer John Wayne Gacy, hoping to find evidence of paranormal activity. Upon entering the house they set up cameras throughout the abandoned house, while going room to room with hand-held cameras. They are performing séances and asking for Gacy to come forward. As the evening progresses it seems the investigators are not prepared for the horror still within the house. In the end all hell breaks loose. Gary finds Mike's dead body in a room upstairs. Gary is dragged away, Franklin disappears and Robbie is chased through the house. After the rest of the cameras cut to static, an apparition of Gacy appears. Robbie is then taken and his camera cuts to static.

== Reception ==
This "faux found footage" film was found "awful to the point of incoherence". An independent reviewer cautioned the audience: "Bear in mind, this is a “found footage” horror film from The Asylum centered on a dead pedophile serial killer wearing clown makeup. Just how “good” does anyone expect it to be?", while MoiraReviews concluded: "Sylvia Panacione gets a great exploitation scene at the end where she tries to conduct a seance as the forces in the house rip off her top. It still fails to amount to anything that makes Gacy House more than an immediately forgettable addition to the Found Footage haunted house genre."

Dread Central noted: "The Asylum is going to extra lengths to convince you this is real footage".
