= 2022 Imagen Awards =

37th annual Imagen Awards

- Date: October 2, 2022
- Location: LA Plaza de Cultura y Artes, Los Angeles, United States
- Website: www.imagen.org/awards/

The 37th Annual Imagen Awards, presented by the Imagen Foundation to honor Latinx talent and contributions within television and film in 2021 and 2022. The ceremony was held on October 2, 2022, at the LA Plaza de Cultura y Artes in Los Angeles, United States.

== Winners and nominees ==
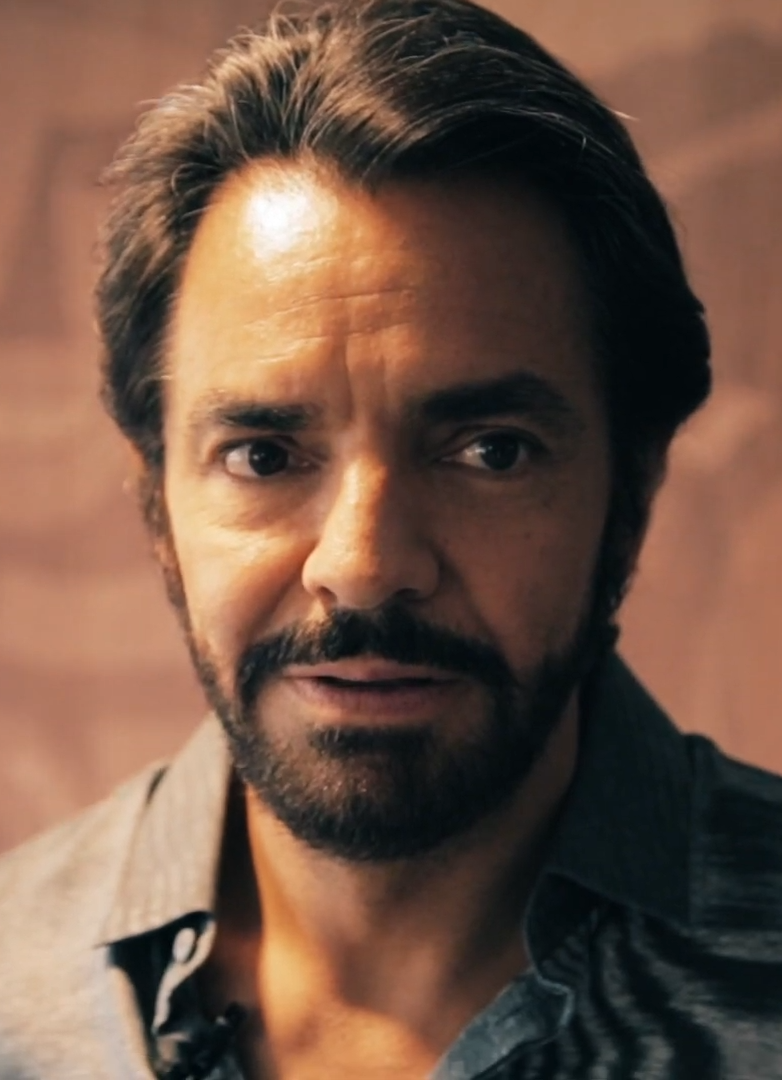
Eugenio Derbez, Best Actor winner

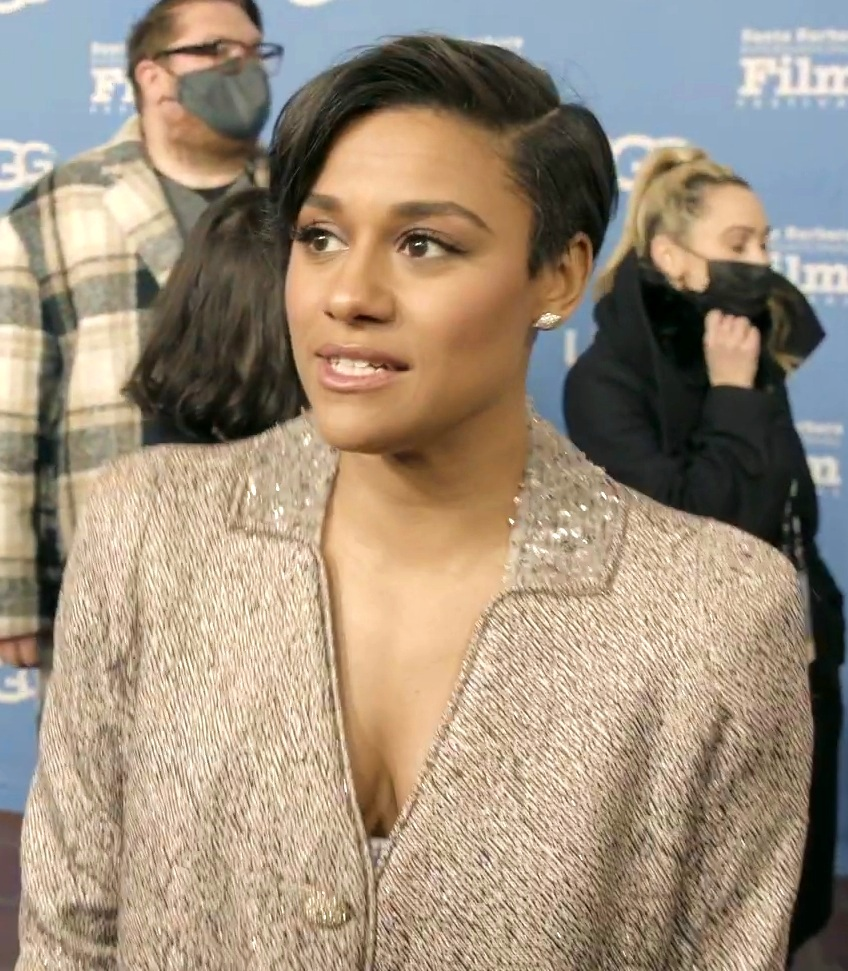
Ariana DeBose, Best Actress winner

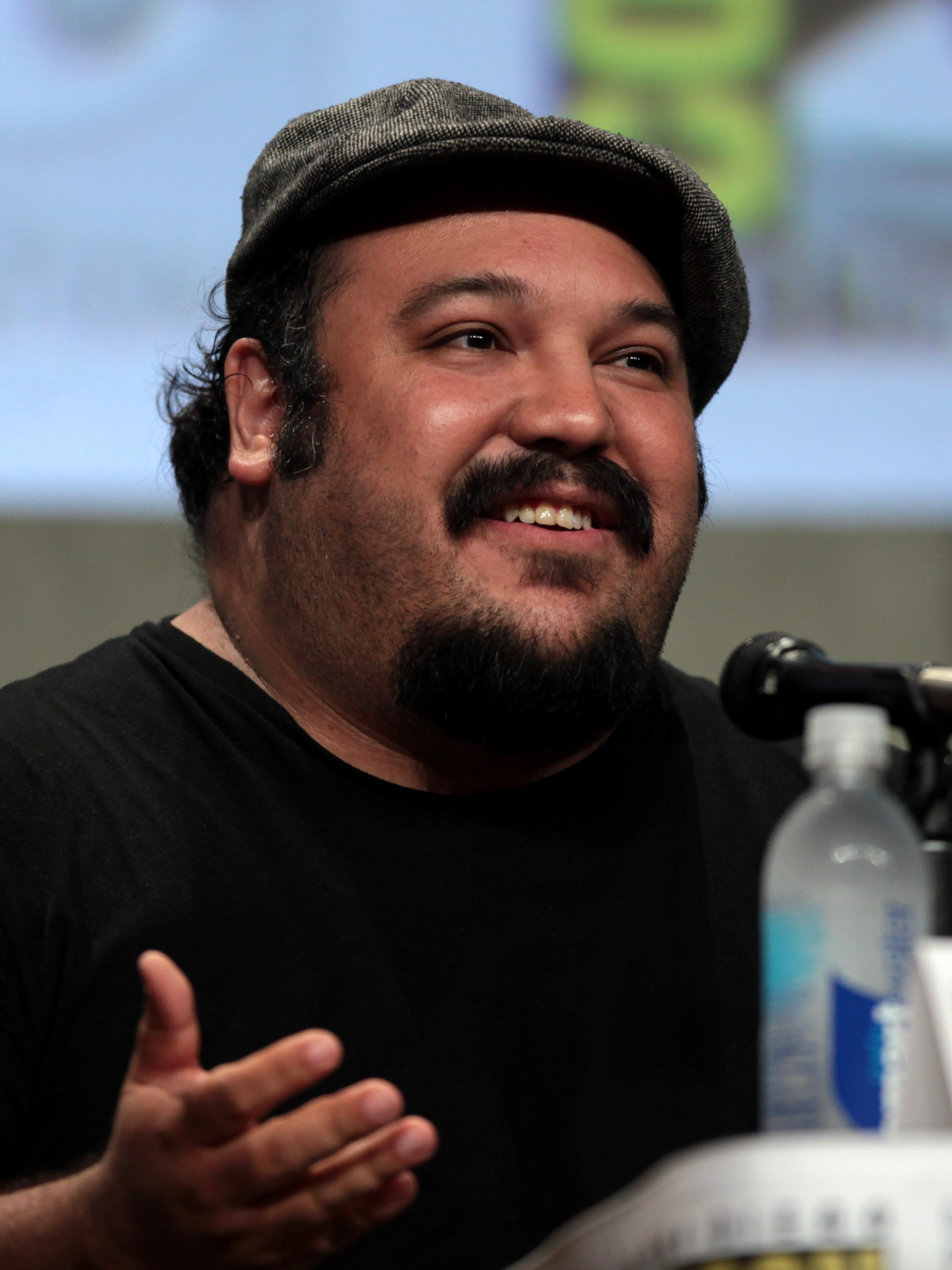
Jorge R. Gutierrez, Best Director – Television winner

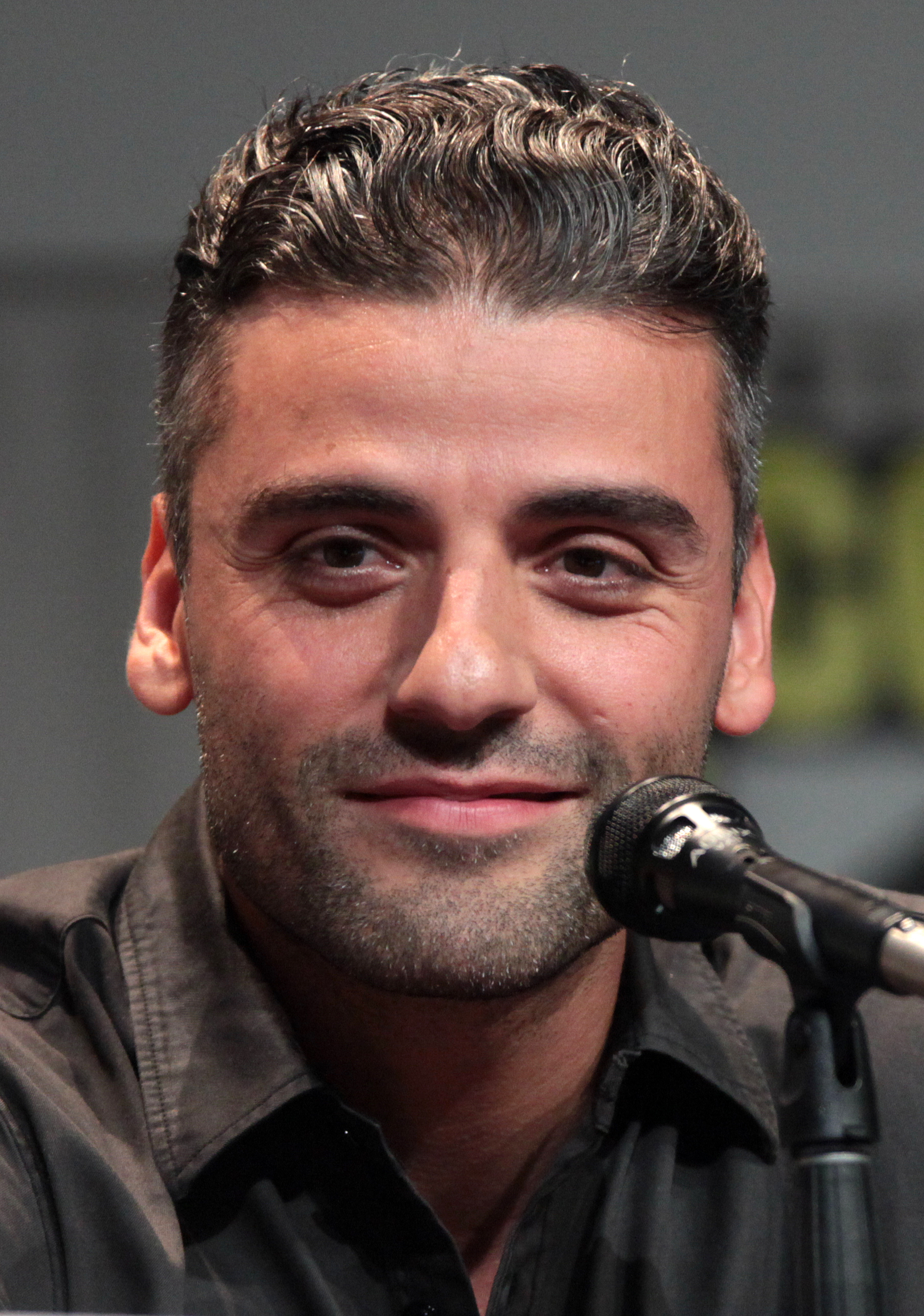
Oscar Isaac, Best Actor – Drama winner

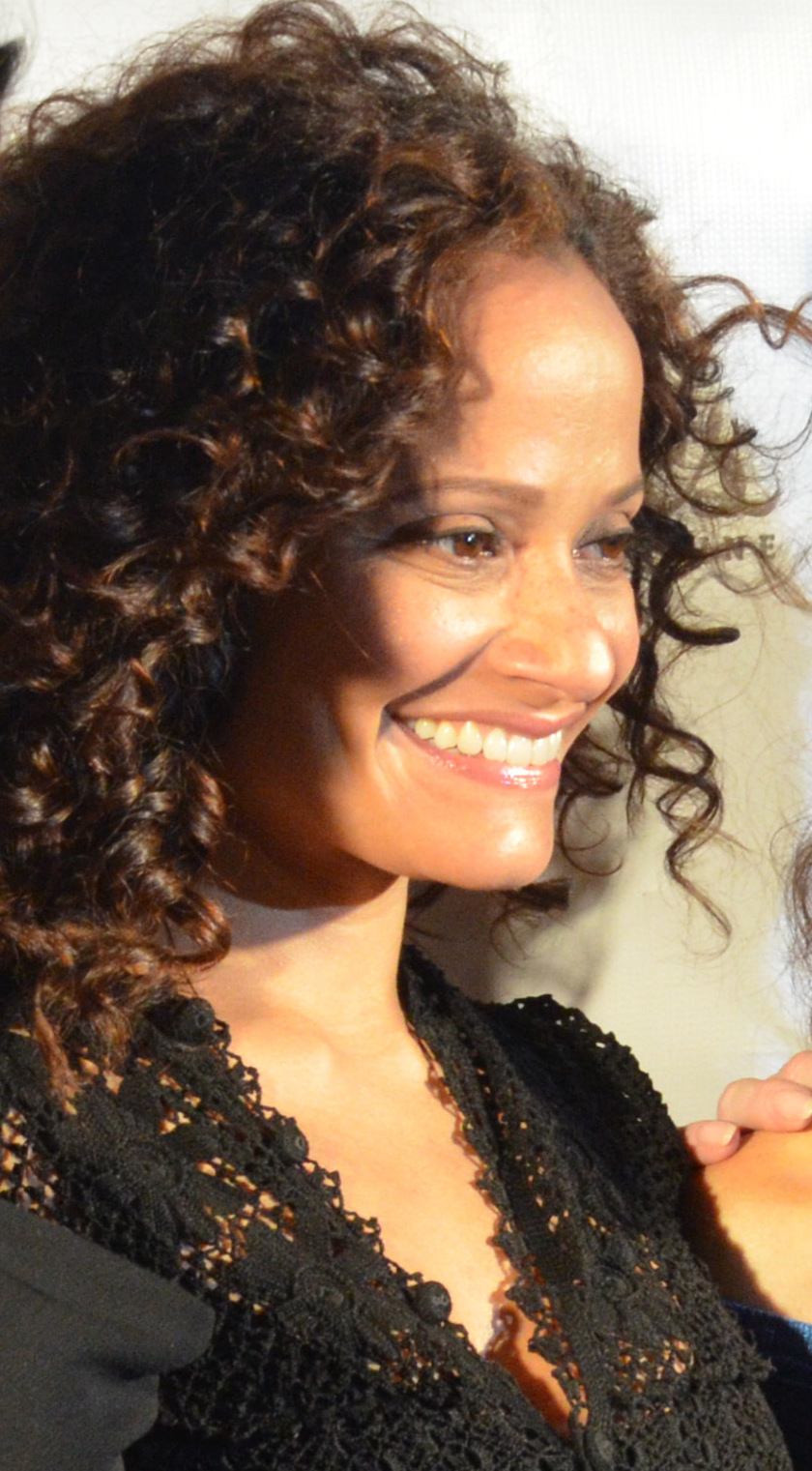
Judy Reyes, Best Actress – Drama winner

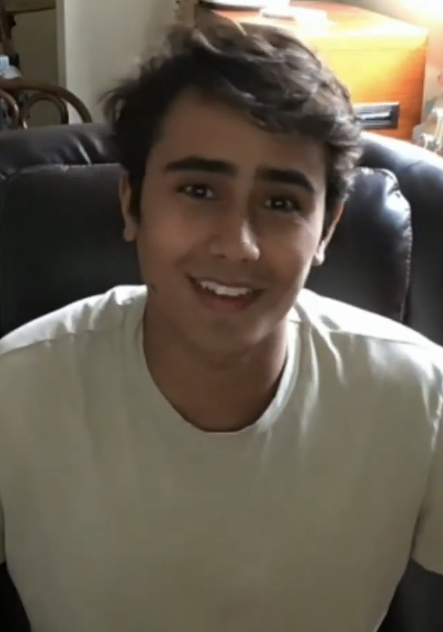
Michael Cimino, Best Actor – Comedy winner

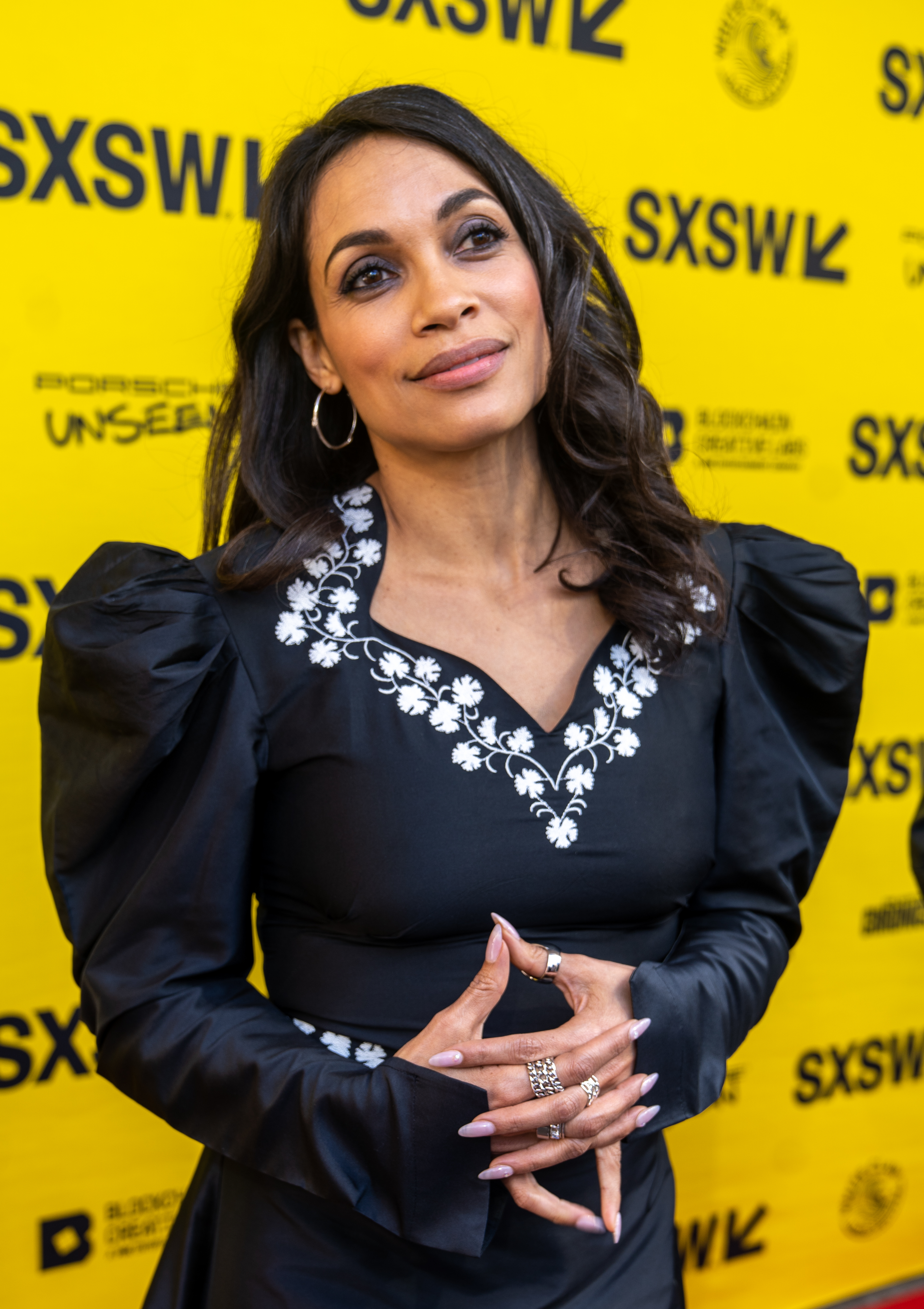
Rosario Dawson, Best Supporting Actress – Drama winner

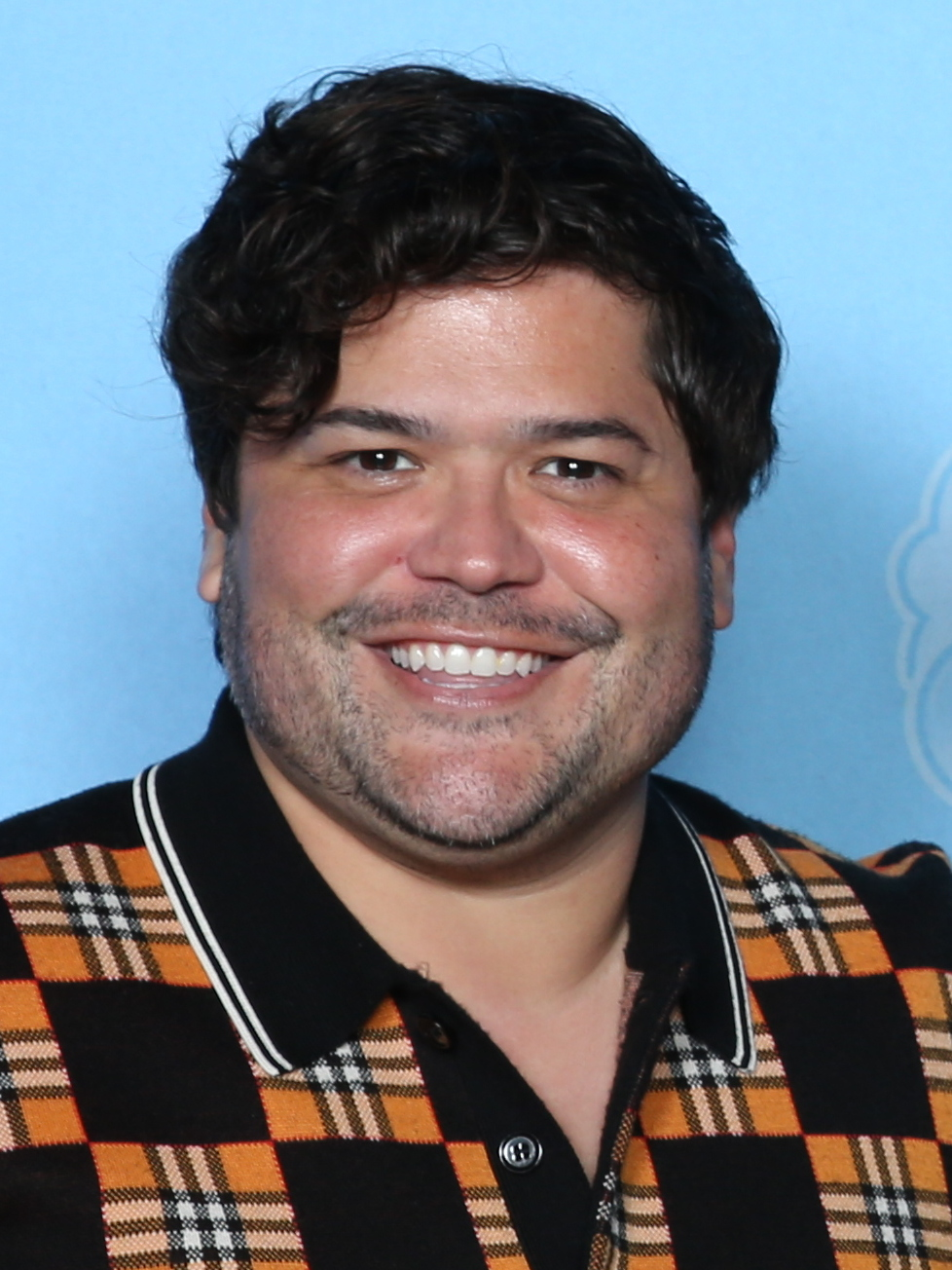
Harvey Guillén, Best Supporting Actor – Comedy winner

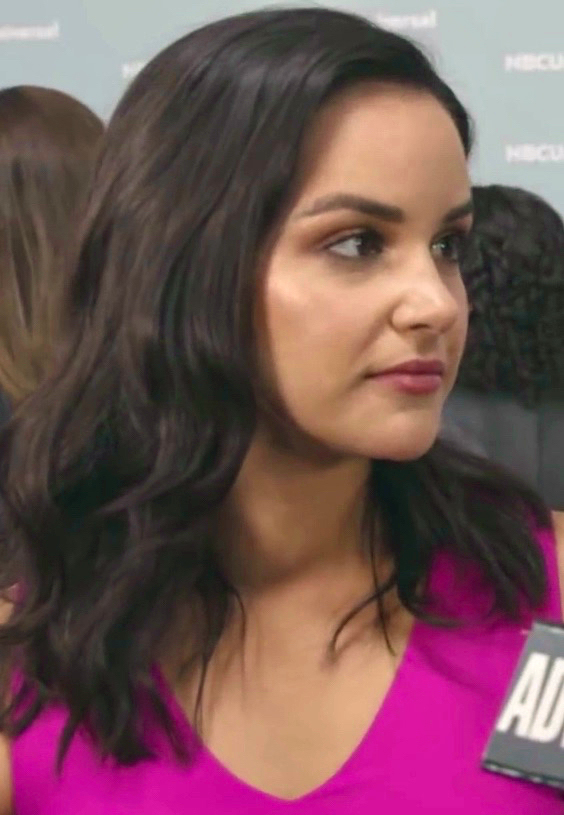
Melissa Fumero, Best Supporting Actress – Comedy winner

The nominations were announced on August 15, 2022, by actors Harvey Guillén and Karrie Martin.

Winners are listed first, highlighted in boldface, and indicated with a double dagger (‡).

=== Film ===
**Best Feature Film**: **Encanto**‡; In the Heights; Language Lessons; Spirit Untamed; West Side Story	**Best Director**: **Jared Bush, Byron Howard, and Charise Castro Smith – Encanto**‡; Reinaldo Marcus Green – King Richard; Alonso Ruizpalacios – A Cop Movie; Steven Spielberg – West Side Story
**Best Actor**: **Eugenio Derbez – CODA as Bernardo "Mr. V" Villalobos**‡; David Alvarez – West Side Story as Bernardo; Gael García Bernal – Old as Guy Cappa; John Leguizamo – Encanto as Bruno Madrigal; Adrian Martinez – iGilbert as Gilbert Gonzalez; Anthony Ramos – In the Heights as Usnavi de la Vega	**Best Actress**: **Ariana DeBose – West Side Story as Anita**‡; Stephanie Beatriz – Encanto as Mirabel Madrigal; Leslie Grace – In the Heights as Nina Rosario; Natalie Morales – Language Lessons as Cariño; Rita Moreno – West Side Story as Valentina; Rachel Zegler – West Side Story as Maria

=== Television ===
**Best Primetime Program – Drama**: **Selena: The Series (Netflix)**‡; Chicago Fire (NBC); El Reino (Netflix); Euphoria (HBO); Now & Then (Apple TV+); Promised Land (ABC); Señorita 89 (Pantaya)	**Best Primetime Program – Comedy**: **Love, Victor (Hulu)**‡; Acapulco (Apple TV+); Gentefied (Netflix); Saved by the Bell (Peacock); With Love (Prime Video)
**Best Primetime Program – Special or Movie**: **Book of Love (Prime Video)**‡; Madres (Prime Video); The Valet (Hulu); Torn from Her Arms (Lifetime)	**Best Director**: **Jorge R. Gutierrez – Maya and the Three (Netflix)**‡; Antonio Campos – The Staircase (HBO); Linda Yvette Chavez – Gentefied (Netflix); America Ferrera – Gentefied (Netflix); Zetna Fuentes – This Is Us (NBC); Reinaldo Marcus Green – We Own This City (HBO); Guillermo Navarro – The Last Days of Ptolemy Grey (Apple TV+)
**Best Actor – Drama**: **Oscar Isaac – Scenes from a Marriage as Jonathan Levy (HBO)**‡; Manolo Cardona – Who Killed Sara? as Álex Guzmán (Netflix); Manuel Garcia-Rulfo – The Lincoln Lawyer as Mickey Haller (Netflix); Jaden Michael – Colin in Black & White as Colin Kaepernick (Netflix); José María Yazpik – Narcos: Mexico as Amado Carrillo Fuentes (Netflix); Daniel Zovatto – Vandal as Nick "Damage" Cruz (Fuse)	**Best Actress – Drama**: **Judy Reyes – Torn from Her Eyes as Thelma Garcia (Lifetime)**‡; Morena Baccarin – The Endgame as Elena Federova (NBC); Rosario Dawson – DMZ as Alma "Zee" Ortega (HBO Max); Ariana Guerra – Madres as Diana (Prime Video); Justina Machado – Switched Before Birth as Anna Ramirez (Lifetime); Rosie Perez – Now & Then as Flora Neruda (Apple TV+); Christian Serratos – Selena: The Series as Selena (Netflix)
**Best Actor – Comedy**: **Michael Cimino – Love, Victor as Victor Salazar (Hulu)**‡; Joaquín Cosío – Gentefied as Casimiro "Pop" Morales (Netflix); Eugenio Derbez – The Valet as Antonio Flores (Hulu); Frankie A. Rodriguez – High School Musical: The Musical: The Series as Carlos Rodriguez (Disney+); Carlos Santos – Gentefied as Chris Morales (Netflix)	**Best Actress – Comedy**: **Victoria Moroles – Plan B as Lupe (Hulu)**‡; Selena Gomez – Only Murders in the Building as Mabel Mora (Hulu); Karrie Martin – Gentefied as Ana Morales (Netflix); Camila Perez – Acapulco as Julia Gonzalez (Apple TV+); Emeraude Toubia – With Love as Lily Diaz (Prime Video)
**Best Supporting Actor – Drama**: **Clayton Cardenas – Mayans M.C. as Angel Reyes (FX)**; Gael García Bernal – Station Eleven as Arthur Leander (HBO Max); Benjamin Bratt – DMZ as Parco Delgado (HBO Max); Santiago Cabrera – Star Trek: Picard as Chris Rios (Paramount+); Alfonso Herrera – Ozark as Javier "Javi" Elizondro (Netflix); Jon Huertas – This Is Us as Miguel Rivas (NBC); Felix Solis – Ozark as Omar Navarro (Netflix)	**Best Supporting Actress – Drama**: **Rosario Dawson – Dopesick as Bridget Meyer (Hulu)**‡; Aimee Carrero – Maid as Danielle (Netflix); Alexa Demie – Euphoria as Madeleine "Maddy" Perez (HBO); Fátima Molina – Torn From Her Arms as Cindy Madrid (Lifetime); Natasha Perez – Selena: The Series as Yolanda Saldívar (Netflix); Patricia Velásquez – List of a Lifetime as Meg (Lifetime)
**Best Supporting Actor – Comedy**: **Harvey Guillén – What We Do in the Shadows as Guillermo de la Cruz (FX)**‡; Damián Alcázar – Acapulco as Don Pablo Bonilla (Apple TV+); Jaime Camil – Schmigadoon! as Doc Jorge Lopez (Apple TV+); Fernando Carsa – Acapulco as Guillermo "Memo" (Apple TV+); Aaron Dominguez – Only Murders in the Building as Oscar Torres (Hulu); James Martinez – Love, Victor as Armando Salazar (Hulu)	**Best Supporting Actress – Comedy**: **Melissa Fumero – Brooklyn Nine-Nine as Amy Santiago (NBC)**‡; Sheila Carrasco – Ghosts as Susan Montero / "Flower" (CBS); Ariana DeBose – Schmigadoon! as Emma Tate (Apple TV+); Selenis Leyva – Diary of a Future President as Gabriela "Gabi" Cañero-Reed (Disney+); Grasie Mercedes – Grand Crew as Fay (NBC)
**Best Young Actor**: **Nik Sanchez – Safe Room as Ian Jackson (Lifetime)**‡; Raphael Alejandro – Bunk'd as Matteo Silva (Disney Channel); Everly Carganilla – The Afterparty as Maggie (Apple TV+); Scarlett Estevez – Christmas...Again?! as Rowena "Ro" Clybourne (Disney Channel); Justin Sanchez – Ghostwriter as Curtis Palmer-Moreno (Apple TV+)	**Best Voice-Over Actor**: **Summer Rose Castillo – Alma's Way as Alma Rivera (PBS Kids)**‡; Eden Espinosa – Alice's Wonderland Bakery as Queen of Hearts (Disney Junior); Sarah-Nicole Robles – The Owl House as Luz Noceda (Disney Channel); Zoe Saldaña – Maya and the Three as Princess Maya (Netflix); Neo Vela – Alma's Way as Ruben "Junior" Rivera (PBS Kids)
**Best Variety or Reality Show**: **We're Here (HBO)**‡; ¿Quién Es La Máscara? (Las Estrellas); Aida Rodriguez: Fighting Words (HBO); Don't Cancel Me with Amara La Negra (Fuse); Home Sweet Home (NBC/Peacock); Pan y Circo (Prime Video)	**Best Youth Programming**: **Alma's Way (PBS Kids)**‡; The Casagrandes (Nickelodeon); The Owl House (Disney Channel); Victor and Valentino (Cartoon Network)

=== General ===
**Best Music Composition for Film or Television**: **Encanto – Lin-Manuel Miranda and Germaine Franco**‡; Cocaine Cowboys: The Kings of Miami – Carlos José Alvarez; Gentefied – Camilo Lara; Maya and the Three – Tim Davies and Gustavo Santaolalla; The White Lotus – Cristobal Tapia de Veer	**Best Music Supervision for Film or Television**: **Encanto – Tom MacDougall**‡; Acapulco – Javier Nuño and Joe Rodriguez; Selena: The Series – Lynn Fainchtein
**Best Documentary**: **VOCES: American Exile**‡; America ReFramed: Five Years North; Invisible Valley; Los Hermanos/The Brothers; POV: On the Divide; Through Our Eyes	**Best Informational Program**: **SC Featured: KIKIMITA – The Hansel Emmanuel Donato Story**‡; La Frontera with Pati Jinich; SC Featured: Rooted; Somos Latinas
**Best Short Film**: **American Masters and VOCES: Lights, Camera, Acción**‡; Growing Fangs; Us Again; Worry Dolls	**Best Commercial Advertisement or Social Awareness Campaign**: **Nuestras Niñas, Las Mujeres Imparables del Futuro**‡; Are You Listening?; Drawn To; Iconos
