= Jesse Garcia =

American actor

Jesse García
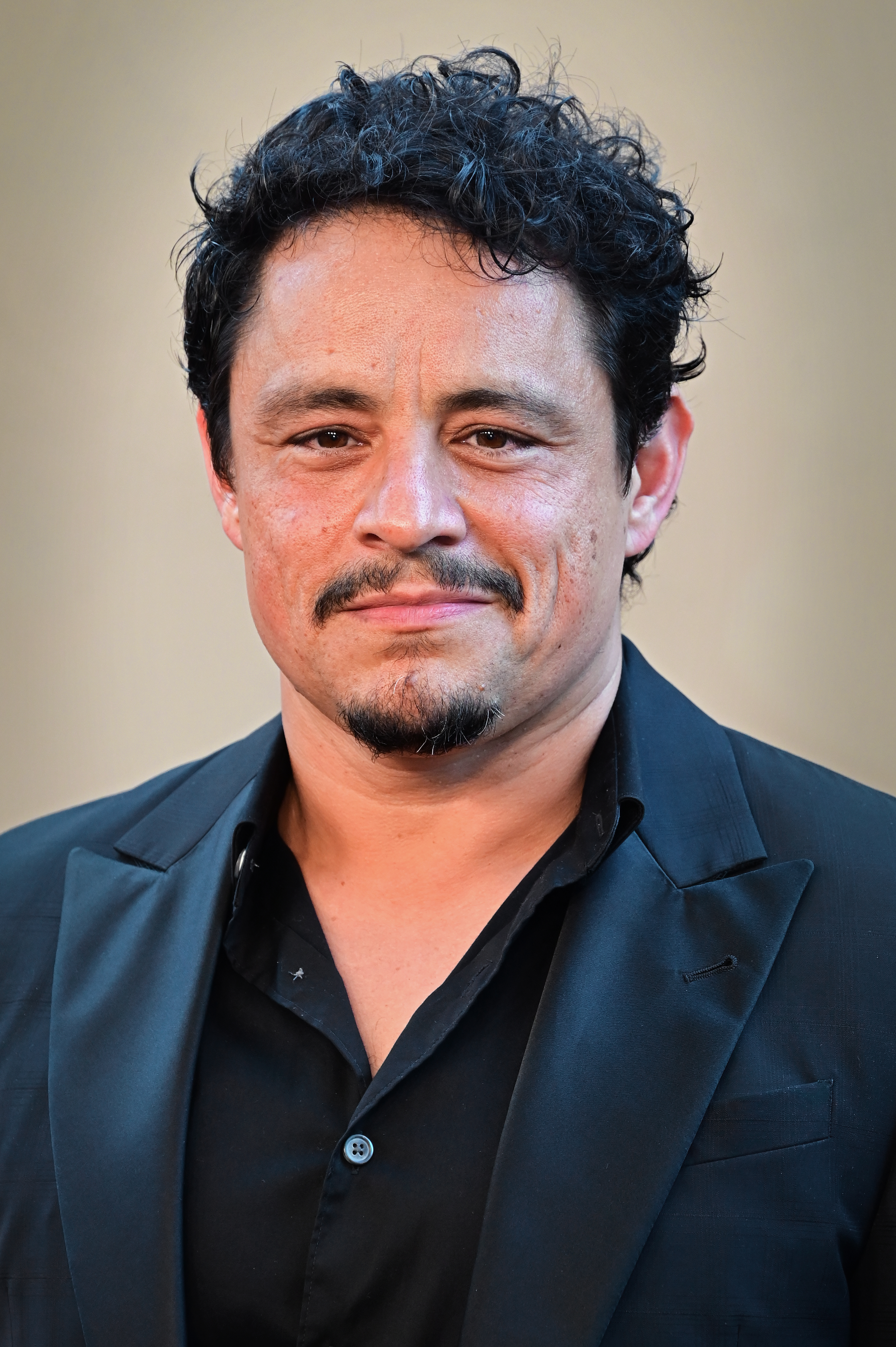
- García in 2026
- Born: December 14, 1982 (age 43); Rawlins, Wyoming, U.S.
- Occupation: Actor
- Years active: 2003–present

Jesse García (born December 14, 1982) is an American actor. He is known for his roles in Quinceañera and Flamin' Hot for which he won Imagen Awards Best Actor.

== Early life and education ==
Garcia was born December 14, 1982 in Rawlins, Wyoming, and spent most of his childhood in Hanna, Wyoming. His father is from the Mexican state of Durango and his mother, a native of Wyoming, is of Spanish descent. He has a younger sister. He was raised as a Jehovah's Witness, though he no longer practices that faith.

In high school, Garcia was heavily involved with cheerleading. He subsequently attended the University of Nebraska on a cheerleading scholarship and studied exercise science. Garcia later moved to Atlanta and took classes at What Films where he learned to write, direct, act, and produce original material. In 2003, he moved to Los Angeles.

== Career ==
Garcia starred in the 2006 film Quinceañera, written and directed by Wash Westmoreland and Richard Glatzer with executive producer Todd Haynes, which won both the Grand Jury Prize and the Audience Award at the 2006 Sundance Film Festival in the Dramatic Independent Feature Competition. Quinceañera was also selected to play at the 2006 Berlin Film Festival. Garcia won Best Actor at the 2007 ALMA Awards for his role as Carlos, a troubled gay teenager, in Quinceañera.

Garcia appeared in the thriller Locker 13 in 2009. He appeared in the 2010 revival of The Pee-wee Herman Show and in the 2010 music video of Wisin & Yandel's "Estoy enamorado". He made a cameo appearance on Marvel's The Avengers in 2012.

He portrayed Richard Montañez in the biographical movie Flamin' Hot (2023), based on Montañez's disputed claim of inventing Flamin' Hot Cheetos.

In 2026, he appeared as Menetus, in Christopher Nolan's adaptation of Homer's epic poem, The Odyssey.

== Filmography ==
=== Films ===
Year	Title	Role	Notes
2003	Performance Anxiety	Guitar Player	
2004	Last Goodbye	Featured Player	
2004	Delivery Boy Chronicles	Mexican Leaf Blower	
2005	Picnic	Man Reading Book	
2005	Unseen		Video
2006	Marrying God	Jesus	
2006	Quinceañera	Carlos	
2006	The Other Side	Search and Rescue Guy	
2006	Father Figure	Jesse	
2007	American Identity	Bobby Freeman	
2007	Put It in a Book	Tiny	
2007	Under the Same Moon	David	
2007	The Comebacks	Jorge Juanson	
2008	Down & Out		Video
2008	Good Dick	Jose	
2008	Emilio	Hot Dog Vendor	
2008	A Beautiful Life	David	
2008	Days of Wrath	Mario	
2009	Saint John of Las Vegas	Park Ranger	
2009	Locker 13	Ray	
2009	Bedrooms	Sal	
2009	Periphery	Smitty	
2009	Spit Brown Buck	Santa	
2010	Elektra Luxx	Camilo	
2010	Hollywood Untitled	Jose	
2010	Mission Park	Jason	
2011	Three Veils	Carlos	
2011	Falling Overnight	Miguel	
2011	Without Men	Boss' Assistant	
2012	House Arrest	Guillermo	
2012	The Avengers	Carrier Bridge Tech	
2014	Alexander and the Terrible, Horrible, No Good, Very Bad Day	Dwayne	
2015	Re-Kill	Hernandez	
2020	Adverse	Detective Ranie	
2021	The Starling	Hector	
2022	Ambulance	Roberto	
2022	What Comes Around	Tim	
2022	Tell It Like a Woman	Johnny	
2023	Flamin' Hot	Richard Montañez	
2023	The Mother	Tarantula	
2025	Alexander and the Terrible, Horrible, No Good, Very Bad Road Trip	Frank Garcia	
2026	The Odyssey	Menetus	
TBA	Iron Jane †		Post-production

Key
†	Denotes films that have not yet been released

=== Television ===
Year	Title	Role	Notes
2004	Expeditions to the Edge		Episode: "Hostage Mountain"
2005	Unfabulous	Fashion Designer	Episode: "The Charity Chase"
2006	The Shield	Mariano	2 episodes
2006	Walkout	Armando Lopez	TV movie
2006	The Closer	Carlos	Episode: "Borderline
2006	Justice	Frankie Duarte	Episode: "Shotgun"
2007	ER	Carlos Vega	Episode: "In a Different Light"
2007	CSI: Miami	Vasco Torres	Episode: "Permanent Vacation"
2007	Law & Order: Criminal Intent	Felix Aguilar	Episode: "Senseless"
2008	Terminator: The Sarah Connor Chronicles	Carlos	3 episodes
2009	NCIS	Marine Private First Class Tomas Tamayo	Episode: "Deliverance"
2011	Sons of Anarchy	Rafi	5 episodes
2012	CSI: Crime Scene Investigation	Ollie Ruiz	Episode: "Wild Flowers"
2013	East Los High	Abraham	Episode: "The Beauty to the Bitch"
2013	Longmire	Rodeo Sharpshooter	Episode: "The Great Spirit"
2014	You're the Worst	Martinez	Episode: "What Normal People Do"
2014–2016	From Dusk till Dawn: The Series	Freddie Gonzalez	Main cast
2015	Looking	Hector	Episode: "Looking for Truth"
2018	Chicago P.D.	Reimundo Morales	Episode: "Captive"
2018	The Last Ship	Manuel Plasencia / Michael / Manuelito	2 episodes
2019	The High Life	Gabriel	Episode: "Pilot"
2019	El Asesino	Frankie	TV movie
2020	Narcos: Mexico	Sal Orozco	9 episodes
2021	Snowfall	Officer Carlos Lorca	3 episodes
2024	Not Dead Yet	TJ	5 episodes
