= Relationship Goals (film) =

- Release poster
- Directed by: Linda Mendoza
- Written by: Michael Elliot; Cory Tynan; Laura Lekkos
- Based on: Relationship Goals: How to Win at Dating, Marriage, and Sex by Pastor Michael Todd
- Produced by: DeVon Franklin
- Starring: Kelly Rowland; Cliff “Method Man” Smith; Robin Thede; Annie Gonzalez; Dennis Haysbert; Matt Walsh
- Music by: Dara Taylor
- Production companies: Amazon MGM Studios; Franklin Entertainment
- Distributed by: Amazon MGM Studios (via Prime Video)
- Release date: February 4, 2026
- Running time: 93 minutes
- Country: United States
- Language: English

Relationship Goals is a 2026 American romantic comedy film directed by Linda Mendoza. The film follows a television producer, Leah Caldwell, who is about to become the first woman to run New York's top morning show, when her ex Jarrett Roy steps in to compete for the same position.

The film was released in the United States by Amazon MGM Studios as an Amazon Prime Video original film on February 4, 2026.

== Plot ==
Leah Caldwell is a television producer at a New York City morning show who is competing to become the program's executive leader. Her professional trajectory changes when her former partner, Jarrett Roy, joins the network and becomes her direct rival for the position.

Jarrett claims to have changed since their breakup, attributing his personal development to the principles outlined in the self-help book Relationship Goals: How to Win at Dating, Marriage, and Sex by Michael Todd. Leah remains focused on her career and is initially reluctant to revisit their past relationship.

As their professional rivalry continues, unresolved personal and professional conflicts resurface. Leah ultimately reevaluates her priorities as she considers whether professional advancement and a renewed personal relationship can coexist.

== Cast ==
- Kelly Rowland as Leah Caldwell, a television producer who wants to become the first woman to run New York’s top morning show
- Cliff “Method Man” Smith as Jarrett Roy, Leah's ex
- Robin Thede as Brenda Phelps
- Annie Gonzalez as Treese Moore
- Dennis Haysbert as Papa Jim
- Matt Walsh as Dan Milken
- Melanie Leishman as Maya
- DeVaughn Nixon as Ayden
- Ryan Jamaal Swain as Ronald

== Production ==
On February 13, 2025, Kelly Rowland and Cliff “Method Man” Smith, along with Robin Thede and Annie Gonzalez, were cast in the romantic comedy film based on Relationship Goals: How to Win at Dating, Marriage, and Sex by Pastor Michael Todd. It was directed by Linda Mendoza, and written by Laura Lekkos, with drafts written by Michael Elliot and Cory Tynan, produced by DeVon Franklin, and executive produced by Rowland and Bart Lipton. Principal photography began in Ontario on March 17, and wrapped on April 28. Dara Taylor composed the score for the film, where Rowland and Method Man also performed the original song "Complicated".

== Release ==
Relationship Goals was released in Europe and in the United States as an Amazon Prime Video original on February 4, 2026.

== Reception ==
On the review aggregator website Rotten Tomatoes, 19% of 16 critics' reviews are positive.

In a three out of five review, Andrew Lawrence of The Guardian wrote that the film is "a tractor beam made stronger by director Linda Mendoza’s extraordinarily fast pace" which "meant to be a faith-based film for women who may be spending Valentine’s Day alone" even if "Relationship Goals is no less parochial a take on marriage, presented yet again as a woman’s only path to true and lasting peace in life". William Bibbiani of TheWrap gave the film a negative review, calling it "insulting, unconvincing, unfunny, [and] unromantic".
