= Miracles from Heaven =

2016 Christian drama film by Patricia Riggen

- Theatrical release poster
- Directed by: Patricia Riggen
- Written by: Randy Brown
- Based on: Miracles from Heaven by Christy Beam
- Produced by: DeVon Franklin; T. D. Jakes; Joe Roth
- Starring: Jennifer Garner; Martin Henderson; Kylie Rogers; Eugenio Derbez; Queen Latifah
- Cinematography: Checco Varese
- Edited by: Emma E. Hickox
- Music by: Carlo Siliotto
- Production companies: Columbia Pictures; Affirm Films; Roth Films; TDJ Enterprises; Franklin Entertainment
- Distributed by: Sony Pictures Releasing
- Release dates: February 21, 2016 (Dallas); March 16, 2016 (United States)
- Running time: 109 minutes
- Country: United States
- Language: English
- Budget: $14 million
- Box office: $74 million

Miracles from Heaven is a 2016 American Christian drama film directed by Patricia Riggen and written by Randy Brown. The film is based on the book of the same name by Christy Beam, which recounts the true story of her young daughter who had a near-death experience and was later cured of an incurable disease. It stars Jennifer Garner, Kylie Rogers, Martin Henderson, John Carroll Lynch, Eugenio Derbez, and Queen Latifah. Miracles from Heaven was released on March 16, 2016, and was a box office success, grossing $74 million worldwide against its $14 million budget, but garnered mixed reviews from critics; some have panned the film for "preaching to the choir", whereas Garner's performance earned widespread acclaim.

== Plot ==
The film is based on a true story set in Burleson, Texas between 2007 and 2012.

Christy and Kevin Beam live with their three daughters, Abbie, Anna, and Adelynn, and are active in their local Baptist church. One day, Anna starts repeatedly vomiting and is taken to see a doctor who cannot find anything abnormal, suggesting lactose intolerance. However, on March 20, 2008, Anna begins feeling intense stomach pain in the middle of the night. Her parents take her to the hospital, but doctors find no signs of illness, saying it is likely acid reflux. Christy insists she won't leave until they have answers.

The following morning, a pediatrician in the hospital diagnoses Anna with an abdominal obstruction, and he tells them he must operate immediately or she will die. After the surgery, the doctor explains that Anna has been left with intestinal pseudo-obstruction and she is unable to eat, so feeding tubes are needed for her nutrition. The doctor then tells the Beams about America's foremost pediatric gastroenterologist, Dr. Samuel Nurko in Boston, but explains it could take months for them to be seen.

While Kevin tries to remain faithful, Christy begins growing uneasy and refuses to go to church after some members of the congregation suggest Anna's disorder may be God's punishment for sinning in their family.

Desperate to get her daughter help, Christy takes Anna to Boston Children's Hospital in January 2009 but is told she can't be seen without an appointment. They spend the day exploring the city with Massachusetts resident Angela Bradford, before the hospital receptionist calls, saying that Dr. Nurko has a last-minute opening.

After examining Anna, Dr. Nurko explains Anna's illness, which has an underlying neurological cause. Anna asks about Dr. Nurko's Elmo necktie, which he tells her he has to wear for losing a bet, but he is allowed to take it off when his next patient is better. After returning home, Christy explains to Kevin she is worried about the costs of treatment. While trying to reassure her, he is shocked when Christy admits she's lost her faith and cannot even pray. Her church's pastor tries to restore her faith, explaining that during the hard times in his life, he felt better when he kept trying to believe.

While Anna goes through extensive treatment, she shares a room with Haley, another young girl who has terminal cancer. Haley asks about her cross necklace, and Anna explains that it reminds her that Jesus is always with her, then gives it to Haley. Later, Haley tells her father, Ben, that she is not afraid to die. Ben is displeased at the exchange, as he doesn't want to give Haley false hope, and asks Christy to prevent it from happening again. Anna begins showing signs of depression, tearfully telling Christy that she wants to die and go to heaven. Her mood is temporarily lifted by a surprise visit from her dad and sisters.

After returning home, Anna and Abbie climb up to a very high branch of an old cottonwood tree. While they are standing on the branch, it begins to break. Anna goes to the trunk for safety, but she then falls into the hollowed-out center.

While firefighters work to get Anna out, Christy and her family gather near the base of the tree and pray together. After Anna is taken out of the tree and airlifted to the hospital, Christy and Kevin are shocked to learn that not only did she survive, but she also suffered no serious injuries, only a minor concussion.

Sometime after the fall, Anna seems to no longer be affected by her illness. She tells her parents that while in the tree, she saw heaven and spoke to God. She said He told her she would be healed. After meeting with Dr. Nurko one last time, he tells Christy that the concussion caused a disruption in Anna's neurological system, which sent her disorder into spontaneous remission. Christy pushes for an explanation, and while Dr. Nurko cannot bring himself to say she is cured (as the condition is incurable), he symbolically removes his Elmo necktie and gives it to Christy.

At church, Christy shares the story of Anna's recovery and her reconnection to her faith. She talks about the love and miracles that she witnessed in the people around her during Anna's illness. While many are happy, some members of the congregation question the validity of the story. Ben, who has traveled from Boston upon hearing the story about Anna, presents himself to the crowd. He tells them that Anna sharing her connection to God with Haley brought her peace and comfort in the hospital, shortly before she passed away.

Later, the Beam family eats pizza together, having all promised earlier to abstain from eating it as long as Anna wasn't able to.

The film ends with clips of the real Beam family where Anna says she has not been sick since and is now a healthy seventh grader.

== Cast ==
- Kylie Rogers as Anna Beam
- Jennifer Garner as Christy Beam, Anna's mother
- Martin Henderson as Dr. Kevin Beam, Christy's husband and Anna's father
- Eugenio Derbez as Dr. Samuel Nurko, a pediatric gastroenterologist who is Anna's doctor at the Boston Children's Hospital.
- Queen Latifah as Angela, a waitress who befriends Anna and her mother in a restaurant in Boston
- Brighton Sharbino as Abbie Beam, the oldest Beam daughter
- Courtney Fansler as Adelynn Beam, the youngest Beam daughter
- Zach Sale as Dr. Blyth, the first doctor to listen to Christy about her sick daughter
- Kelly Collins Lintz as Emmy, a family friend of the Beams
- John Carroll Lynch as Reverend Scott, the senior pastor of the Beam family's church
- Brandon Spink as Billy Snyder, a friend of Anna
- Hannah Alligood as Haley, a cancer patient who becomes friends with Anna and later dies offscreen
- Wayne Péré as Ben, Haley's father
- Bruce Altman as Dr. Burgi, Anna's doctor who is the head of the pediatric division at the hospital in Texas
- Suehyla El-Attar as a receptionist at the Boston Children's hospital

The real Beam family makes a cameo at the end of the film before the credits.

== Production ==
On November 10, 2014, The Hollywood Reporter reported that Sony Pictures Entertainment had acquired the film adaptation rights to a faith-based memoir, Miracles From Heaven: A Little Girl, Her Journey to Heaven, and Her Amazing Story of Healing, written by Christy Beam, and hired Randy Brown to write the script. The team behind the studios' 2014 Christian film Heaven Is for Real, T. D. Jakes and Joe Roth, were retained to produce the film along with DeVon Franklin.

On April 8, 2015, the studio hired Patricia Riggen to direct the film. On April 30, 2015, Jennifer Garner was cast to star in the film as Christy Beam. On June 22, 2015, The Hollywood Reporter reported that Queen Latifah was cast as a waitress who befriends Anna and Christy at the Boston Children's Hospital. On the same day, Variety confirmed the casting of Martin Henderson to play the girl's father and Beam's husband.

On June 29, 2015, Kylie Rogers was cast as Beam's sick daughter Anna. On July 17, 2015, Eugenio Derbez was cast to play a character inspired by Children's Hospital specialist Dr. Samuel Nurko, an American-based Mexican pediatric gastroenterologist who eases his young patients' treatment by playing games with them. John Carroll Lynch was also cast in the film as the pastor.

=== Filming ===
Principal photography on the film began in Atlanta, Georgia, in July 2015. David R. Sandefur and Emma E. Hickox were appointed as production designer and editor, respectively. On August 2, 2015, Latifah and Garner were spotted on the set of film in Atlanta.

== Soundtrack ==
The Miracles from Heaven soundtrack features songs from Howie Day, George Harrison, Clayton Anderson, Third Day and others. The southern Christian rock band Third Day made a cameo as the church worship band.

No.	Title	Music	Length
1.	"Soul on Fire"	Third Day
2.	"Right Where I Belong"	Clayton Anderson
3.	"Collide"	Howie Day	4:09
4.	"Your Words"	Third Day
5.	"Here Comes the Sun"	Cam	3:06

== Release ==
On May 11, 2015, the film was scheduled for a March 18, 2016 release by Columbia Pictures. On January 10, it was moved up two days later to March 16. The film held its world premiere on February 21, 2016, in Dallas, Texas.

=== Home media ===
Miracles from Heaven was released on Digital Media on June 21, 2016, and was followed by a DVD, Blu-ray, and 4K Ultra HD release on July 12, 2016, from AFFIRM Films and Sony Pictures Home Entertainment. The film debuted in second place on the home video sales chart behind The Divergent Series: Allegiant for the week ending on July 17, 2016.

== Reception ==
=== Box office ===
Miracles from Heaven grossed $61.7 million in North America and $12.2 million in other territories for a worldwide total of $73.9 million, against a budget of $13 million.

The film grossed $1.9 million on its first day, finishing second at the box office behind Zootopia ($4.6 million). The film had an $18 million Wednesday-to-Sunday gross, including $14.8 million in its opening weekend, finishing third at the box office behind Zootopia ($37.2 million) and The Divergent Series: Allegiant ($29 million).

On its opening weekend in the United Kingdom, Miracles from Heaven grossed $29 thousand, dropping to $231 by week four.

=== Critical response ===
On Rotten Tomatoes, the film has an approval rating of 45%, based on 91 reviews, with an average rating of 5.1/10. The site's consensus reads, "Miracles from Heaven makes the most out of an outstanding performance from Jennifer Garner, but it isn't quite enough to keep this faith-based drama from preaching to the choir." On Metacritic the film has a score of 44 out of 100, based on 20 critics, indicating "mixed or average reviews". Audiences polled by CinemaScore gave the film an average grade of "A+" on an A+ to F scale.

=== Accolades ===
Association	Category	Nominee	Result	Ref.
People's Choice Awards	Favorite Dramatic Movie	Miracles from Heaven	Nominated	
Teen Choice Awards	Choice Movie: Drama	Miracles from Heaven	Won	
Teen Choice Awards	Choice Movie Actress: Drama	Jennifer Garner	Nominated	
MovieGuide Awards	Best Movie for Families	Miracles from Heaven	Won	
