= Richard Montañez =

American businessman and author

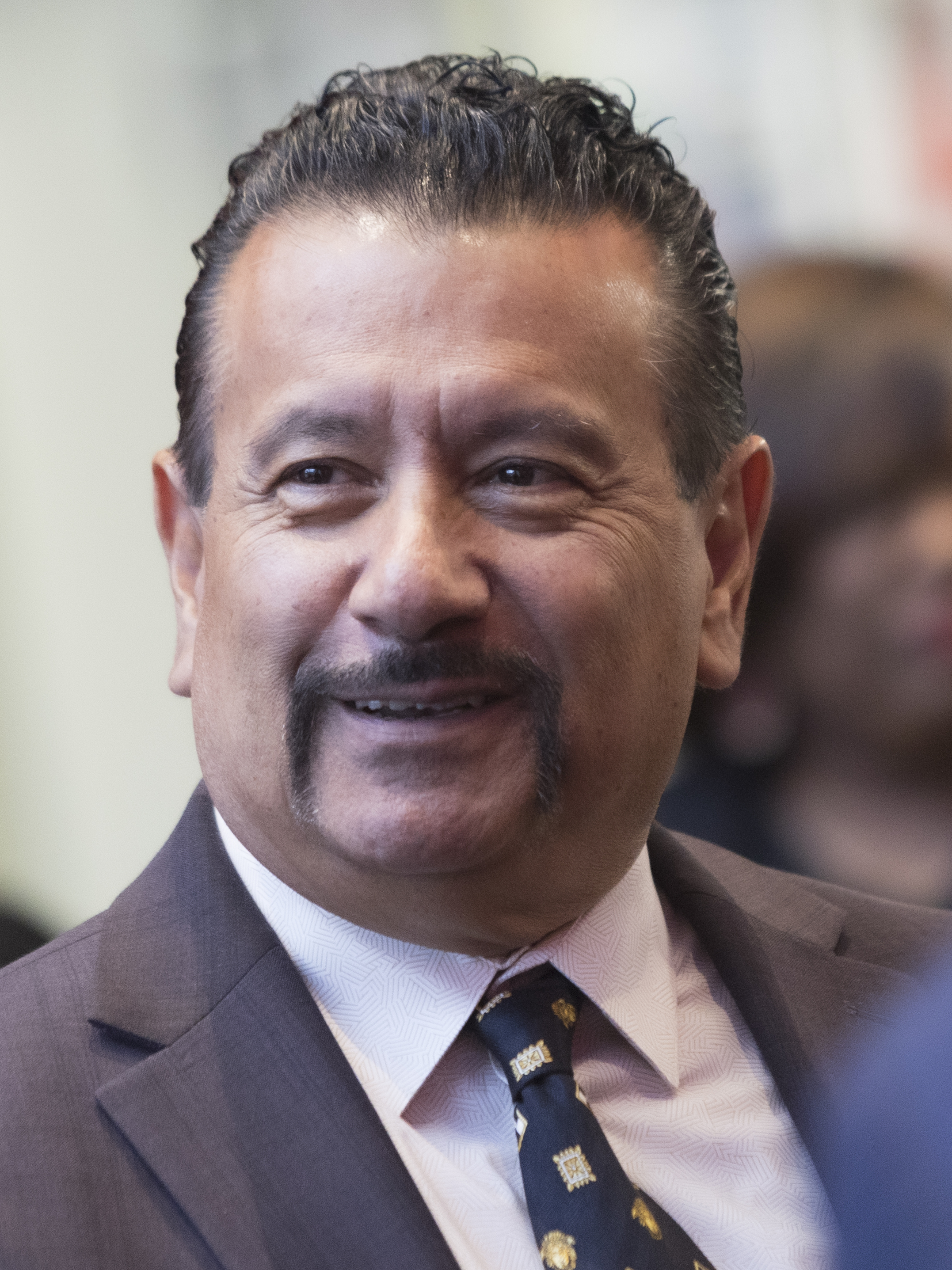
- Montañez in 2024
- Born: c. 1958; Ontario, California, US
- Occupations: Businessman; author; motivational speaker
- Employer: Frito-Lay (retired in 2019)
- Known for: Claiming to have invented Flamin' Hot Cheetos

Richard Montañez is an American businessman, motivational speaker, and author.

After dropping out of school, he was hired by Frito-Lay as a janitor and went on to become an executive in the company. He is best known for his claim of inventing Flamin' Hot Cheetos, which is disputed by Frito-Lay and other employees. This claim served as the basis for the 2023 film Flamin' Hot.

== Early life ==
Montañez was born to a Mexican-American family in Ontario, California. One of ten siblings, he was raised in a migrant labor camp in Guasti, an unincorporated community outside of Los Angeles.

He dropped out of school and worked as a laborer before being hired at the age of 18 as a janitor for Frito-Lay, at its Rancho Cucamonga factory, in 1976. According to records at Frito-Lay, Montañez was promoted to a machinist operator position by October 1977, and was a senior machinist operator in autumn 1993.

== Career ==
=== Flamin' Hot Cheetos ===
According to Montañez's account, when a Cheetos machine broke down, he took home a batch of unflavored snacks and seasoned them with spices akin to Mexican street corn. He pitched this idea to CEO Roger Enrico over the phone and was invited to deliver an in-person presentation, which he prepared for by researching marketing at the public library. Montañez then presented the product as appealing to the growing Latino market, and provided samples in plastic bags that he had hand-decorated and sealed. It was soft-launched six months later to a test market in Los Angeles, and approved for national release in 1992. Newsweek reported that the flavor, since expanded to a full product line, "rejuvenated the brand" and garnered billions in revenue.

==== Debate over creation ====
In May 2021, a Los Angeles Times article disputed Montañez's claim, reporting that based on an internal investigation at Frito-Lay, he did not create Flamin' Hot Cheetos. A spokesperson for Frito-Lay stated, "we value Richard's many contributions to our company, especially his insights into Hispanic consumers, but we do not credit the creation of Flamin' Hot Cheetos or any Flamin' Hot products to him." Additional reporting by the Times indicated that Montañez's claims did not line up with other events in the product's release timeline, including McCormick developing the seasoning and providing initial samples to Frito-Lay on December 15, 1989, newspaper articles announcing the Chicago, Detroit, Cleveland, and Houston test market release in 1990, and Roger Enrico not joining Frito-Lay until 1991, among other inaccuracies. The internal investigation was prompted by a complaint in 2018 from Lynne Greenfeld, a former employee who managed the team that developed the spicy snack for the single serve format. Fred Lindsay, who was a sales rep for Frito-Lay in the Great Lakes region before being promoted to its corporate headquarters, was also cited in interviews with former employees as being influential to the early development of spicy snacks. According to the article, however, Montañez did in fact rise from a floor-level position to a marketing executive at Frito-Lay, and he was involved in pitching new products such as Flamin' Hot Popcorn while still a machine operator in 1993 followed by two types of Fritos—Flamin' Hot and Lime and Chile Corn Chips. Roberto Siewczynski, who worked with Frito-Lay as a Latino-focused consultant, clarified that events Montañez has described actually took place during the Sabrositas test market in 1994.

Following the LA Times article, NPR reporter Sarah Gonzalez disclosed her own investigation for a Planet Money interview with Montañez released prior to the article. According to Al Carey, a former executive at Frito-Lay, and Patti Reuff, Roger Enrico's former assistant, Montañez pitched a similar product, but this could not have been before 1992. Carey stated the product was approved and sold in California using seasoning from the Midwest. Frito-Lay noted that Montañez met with Al Carey and Jim Rich at the Rancho Cucamonga plant, where he and two others "presented several products developed for Latino consumers, including cinnamon and spicy popcorn, and spicy Cheetos." Roger Enrico was not present and the date could not be confirmed, leaving it unclear whether this was the meeting Montañez, Carey, and Reuff described.

Montañez maintained his claims to Variety after the LA Times article, saying that he was pushed out of development before the test markets and his contributions were not documented due to his low position in the company. In response, Flamin' Hot screenwriter Lewis Colick added that "enough" of the story was true even if it was not entirely factual. PepsiCo released a statement in support of Montañez's contributions to the company, saying that the issue has caused "a strain on our valued friendship with Richard Montañez and the Latino community." While the statement claimed that "information we shared with the media has been misconstrued by some," it did not contradict or deny the Times' reporting.

In July 2024, Montañez filed a lawsuit against PepsiCo, due to their statements saying that Montañez did not create Flamin' Hot Cheetos. The lawsuit claimed that PepsiCo committed fraud, racial discrimination, and defamation towards Montañez. The lawsuit was initially dismissed in May 2025, after the judge ruled that the allegations by Montañez "were insufficient or lacked 'factual support.'", though the judge allowed Montañez to file an amended complaint. By July 2025 both parties settled confidentially on undisclosed terms.

== Later career ==
Montañez began giving keynote speeches, largely based on his Flamin' Hot Cheetos claim, in the late 2000s.

Montañez's last position was vice president of multicultural sales and community promotions for PepsiCo North America. He retired from PepsiCo in March 2019 during an internal investigation into his Flamin' Hot Cheetos claim.

Montañez is the author of two books based on his life experiences: A Boy, a Burrito, and a Cookie, and Flamin' Hot: The Incredible True Story of One Man's Rise from Janitor to Top Executive. He is the subject of a biographical film, Flamin' Hot, directed by Eva Longoria.
