= Gentefied =

2020 American comedy-drama television series

- Genre: Comedy drama
- Created by: Marvin Lemus & Linda Yvette Chávez
- Starring: Joaquín Cosío; J.J. Soria; Karrie Martin Lachney; Carlos Santos
- Music by: Brian D'Oliveira; Camilo Lara
- Country of origin: United States
- Original languages: English; Spanish
- No. of seasons: 2
- No. of episodes: 18

Production
- Executive producers: Monica Macer; Charles D. King; Aaliyah Williams; Kim Roth; America Ferrera; Teri Weinberg; Marvin Lemus & Linda Yvette Chávez; Marta Fernandez
- Producers: Wileen Dragovan; Lance W. Lanfear
- Cinematography: Logan Schneider; Pedro Gómez Millán
- Editors: Edwin Ulysses Rivera; Jesus Huidobro; Mark Bourgeois; Waldemar Centeno
- Camera setup: Single-camera
- Running time: 25–34 minutes
- Production companies: MACRO; Sector 7 Productions; Anchor Baby Productions; Take Fountain Productions; Yellow Brick Road

Original release
- Network: Netflix
- Release: February 21, 2020 – November 19, 2021

Gentefied is an American comedy-drama television series created by Marvin Lemus and Linda Yvette Chávez, that premiered on Netflix on February 21, 2020. The series stars Karrie Martin, Joseph Julian Soria, Carlos Santos and Joaquín Cosío. In May 2020, the series was renewed for a second season which premiered on November 10, 2021. In January 2022, the series was canceled after two seasons.

== Synopsis ==
Gentefied follows the story of "three Mexican-American cousins and their struggle to chase the American Dream, even while that same dream threatens the things they hold most dear: their neighborhood, their immigrant grandfather and the family taco shop".

== Cast and characters ==
=== Main ===
- Joaquín Cosío as Casimiro "Pop" Morales, a widowed owner of "Mama Fina's". He and his wife Delfina ('Mama Fina') had three sons.
- J.J. Soria as Erik Morales, one of Pop's grandsons with a baby on the way. He's the son of one of Pop's sons.
- Karrie Martin Lachney as Ana Morales, one of Pop's granddaughters and an artist. She's the daughter of Pop’s deceased son.
- Carlos Santos as Chris Morales, one of Pop's grandsons and a chef. He's the son of Pop’s eldest son, Ernesto.

=== Recurring ===
- Julissa Calderon as Yessika Castillo, Ana's girlfriend who is a local activist
- Jaime Alvarez as Javier, a local musician
- Greg Ellis as Chef Austin, Chris's boss at "Mangia" who is also the executive chef
- Annie Gonzalez as Lidia Solis, Erik's pregnant highly educated girlfriend
- Bianca Melgar as Nayeli Morales, Ana's sister and another of Pop's granddaughters
- Laura Patalano as Beatriz Morales, Ana and Nayeli's mother who is a seamstress. Widow of one of Pop's sons.
- Rafael Sigler as Pancho Solis, Lidia's father
- Al Patiño as Chuey
- Brenda Banda as Norma, one of Pop's employees
- Felipe Esparza as Crazy Dave
- Michelle Ortiz as Connie
- Manuel Uriza as Ernesto Morales (season 2), Pop's estranged eldest son and Chris's father
- Melinna Bobadilla as Melinna Barragán (season 2), Pop's immigration lawyer who works for a non-profit organization
- Ivana Rojas as Saraí Damian (season 2), a chef and Chris's love interest
- Clarissa Thibeaux as Bree Solano (season 2), a queer advertising executive who is recruiting Ana to work for Nike
- Alma Martinez as Lupe. Wife of Casimiro Morales (Season 2)

=== Guest stars ===
- America Ferrera as Andy Cruz (season 1)
- Wilmer Valderrama as Rob (season 1)
- Van Jones as Himself (season 2)

== Episodes ==
=== Series overview ===
Season	Episodes	Originally released
1	10	February 21, 2020
2	8	November 19, 2021

=== Season 1 (2020) ===
No. overall	No. in season	Title	Directed by	Written by	Original release date
1	1	"Casimiro"	Marvin Lemus	Marvin Lemus & Linda Yvette Chávez	February 21, 2020
2	2	"Bail Money"	Marvin Lemus	Marvin Lemus & Linda Yvette Chávez	February 21, 2020
3	3	"Bad Hombres"	America Ferrera	Alessia Costantini	February 21, 2020
4	4	"Unemployed AF"	America Ferrera	Arielle Díaz	February 21, 2020
5	5	"The Mural"	Marta Cunningham	Linda Yvette Chávez	February 21, 2020
6	6	"The Grapevine"	Marta Cunningham	Marvin Lemus	February 21, 2020
7	7	"Brown Love"	Aurora Guerrero	Monica Macer	February 21, 2020
8	8	"Women's Work"	Aurora Guerrero	Emilia Serrano	February 21, 2020
9	9	"Protest Tacos"	Andrew Ahn	Monica Macer & Camila María Concepción & Jamie Bess Tunkel	February 21, 2020
10	10	"Delfina"	Andrew Ahn	Linda Yvette Chávez & Marvin Lemus	February 21, 2020

=== Season 2 (2021) ===
No. overall	No. in season	Title	Directed by	Written by	Original release date
11	1	"Welcome Home, Pop"	America Ferrera	Linda Yvette Chávez & Marvin Lemus	November 10, 2021
12	2	"Vivian Castro Hates Mexicans"	America Ferrera	Marvin Lemus & Linda Yvette Chávez	November 10, 2021
13	3	"Daddy"	Linda Yvette Chávez	Arielle Díaz	November 10, 2021
14	4	"Send Me A Sign"	Diego Velasco	Luisa Leschin	November 10, 2021
15	5	"Yessika's Day Off"	Marvin Lemus	Keith Antone & Cameron J. Ross	November 10, 2021
16	6	"Sangiving"	America Ferrera	Arielle Díaz	November 10, 2021
17	7	"No More Band-Aids"	Marvin Lemus	Keith Antone & Cameron J. Ross & Francisco Cabrera-Feo	November 10, 2021
18	8	"No Human Is Illegal"	Marvin Lemus	Linda Yvette Chávez & Luisa Leschin	November 10, 2021

== Production ==
=== Development ===
On February 6, 2019, it was announced that Netflix had given the production a series order for a ten-episode first season. The series is created by Marvin Lemus and Linda Yvette Chávez who are credited as executive producers alongside Monica Macer, Aaliyah Williams, America Ferrera, Charles D. King, Kim Roth and Teri Weinberg. America Ferrera will also be directing two episodes of the series. MACRO, Take Fountain and Yellow Brick Road will be involved in the production of the series. The series was released on February 21, 2020. On May 18, 2020, Netflix renewed the series for an eight-episode second season. On November 23, 2020, it was announced that the series's executive producer Aaliyah Williams signed a deal with CBS Studios. The second season premiered on November 10, 2021. On January 13, 2022, Netflix canceled the series after two seasons.

=== Casting ===
In April 2019, it was announced that Karrie Martin, Joseph Julian Soria, Carlos Santos and Joaquín Cosío would star in the series. In May 2019, it was reported that Julissa Calderon, Annie Gonzalez, Laura Patalano, Felipe Esparza, Rafael Sigler, Jaime Alvarez, Bianca Melgar, Michelle Ortiz and Alejandro Patiño were cast in recurring roles. In April 2021, Clarissa Thibeaux, Manuel Uriza, Ivana Rojas, and Melinna Bobadilla joined the cast in recurring roles for the second season.

Gonzalez has a role in another show, Vida, which also explores the issue of gentrification in Boyle Heights. When NBC News reporter Ludwig Hurtado asked about the multiple shows on the same topic, Gonzalez said, "If we can have all these other procedurals of police shows and firefighters shows, we could have more shows like this. There's never enough.”

== Reception ==
=== Critical response ===
On Rotten Tomatoes, the first season has an approval rating of 92% based on 24 reviews, with an average rating of 8/10. The website's critics consensus states, "If at times a bit blunt, Gentefied's gente-centric approach to the realities of gentrification is as strikingly personal as it is hilariously relatable." On Metacritic, it has a weighted average score of 70 out of 100, based on 11 critics, indicating "generally favorable reviews".

Writing for The New York Times, James Poniewozik thought the series was didactic at times, though positively, "The production feels connected to the place, sidewalk and soil. The show's voice is distinctive and assured, both figuratively and literally. It slips naturally among English and Spanish and Spanglish the same way its stories slip among worlds — from the Boyle Heights streets to the gallery world, from immigrant women sewing piecework to immigrant line cooks chiffonading herbs."

The second season holds a 100% approval rating on Rotten Tomatoes, based on 5 reviews, with an average rating of 8/10.

=== Accolades ===
Gentefied was nominated for the Outstanding Comedy Series category for the 33rd GLAAD Media Awards in 2022.
