= Quinceañera (film) =

2006 film directed by Richard Glatzer and Wash Westmoreland

- Promotional poster
- Directed by: Richard Glatzer; Wash Westmoreland
- Written by: Richard Glatzer; Wash Westmoreland
- Produced by: Anne Clements
- Starring: Emily Rios; Jesse Garcia; Chalo González
- Cinematography: Eric Steelberg
- Edited by: Robin Katz; Clay Zimmerman
- Music by: Victor Bock; Michael B. Jeter; J. Peter Robinson; Micko Westmoreland
- Production company: Kitchen Sink Entertainment
- Distributed by: Sony Pictures Classics
- Release dates: January 23, 2006 (Sundance); August 2, 2006 (United States)
- Running time: 90 minutes
- Languages: English; Spanish
- Budget: $400,000
- Box office: $2.5 million

Quinceañera (English: "Fifteen-year-old") is a 2006 American independent drama film written and directed by Richard Glatzer and Wash Westmoreland. Set in Echo Park, Los Angeles, the film follows the lives of two young Mexican American cousins who become estranged from their families—Magdalena (played by Emily Rios) because of her unwed teenage pregnancy and Carlos (Jesse Garcia) because of his homosexuality—and are taken in by their elderly great-uncle Tomas (Chalo González).

The film was inspired by Glatzer and Westmoreland's experience as a white gay couple moving into the gentrifying neighborhood of Echo Park, a predominantly Hispanic working-class community. They wrote, cast and filmed Quinceañera over four months in 2005 after securing a US$400,000 budget from investors. It was filmed in Echo Park with the assistance of Glatzer and Westmoreland's neighbors and a cast of largely nonprofessional actors. It premiered at the Sundance Film Festival on January 23, 2006, where it won the Grand Jury Prize and the Audience Award. It was released in the United States on August 2, 2006, to mostly positive reviews and earned $2.5 million at the box office.

== Plot ==
Magdalena, a fourteen-year-old girl from a working-class Mexican American family in Echo Park, Los Angeles, attends her cousin Eileen's quinceañera, an extravagant coming-of-age ceremony to celebrate her fifteenth birthday. Eileen's older brother Carlos—who has been disowned by his family due to his homosexuality and now lives with his great-uncle Tomas—arrives at the celebrations but is forced to leave by his father.

Magdalena herself is about to turn fifteen but her parents cannot afford to host a quinceañera as lavish as Eileen's, and they deny her repeated requests to hire a Hummer limousine for the occasion. While preparing for her quinceañera, Magdalena learns that she is pregnant by her friend Herman although they had only once engaged in non-penetrative intercourse.

Her Christian father is furious, believing that Magdalena has had premarital sex despite her protestations that she is still a virgin. She leaves her family to move in with Tomas and Carlos and continues to see Herman until she discovers that his mother has sent him away to live with relatives to prevent him from seeing Magdalena.

Carlos becomes sexually involved with the white gay couple, James and Gary, who recently bought Tomas's property and are now his landlords and neighbors, but he eventually begins a secret affair with Gary without James's knowledge. With Magdalena's pregnancy progressing, Carlos offers to financially support her and to act as a surrogate father for the child once it is born. When James discovers his partner's affair with Carlos he feels betrayed and Tomas soon receives a letter notifying him that his landlords are evicting him.

Tomas, Magdalena and Carlos struggle to find an affordable place to live due to the gentrification of the area and the rising real estate prices, but Tomas dies in his sleep shortly before they are due to be evicted. In the aftermath, Magdalena is reunited with her mother and together they visit a gynecologist, who confirms that Magdalena conceived without having penetrative sex. Magdalena's father apologizes to her at Tomas's funeral, believing her conception to be a miracle, and she forgives him.

Magdalena eventually receives the quinceañera she had wished for, complete with a Hummer limousine, with her parents in attendance and Carlos as her escort.

== Cast ==
- Emily Rios as Magdalena
- Jesse Garcia as Carlos
- Chalo González as Tio Tomas
- J.R. Cruz as Herman
- David W. Ross as Gary
- Alicia Sixtos as Eileen
- Jesus Castaños-Chima as Ernesto
- Jason L. Wood as James
- Araceli Guzman-Rico as Maria

== Production ==
In 2004 we were invited to our next door neighbor's quinceañera (which is a giant 15th birthday celebration for Latina girls). Once we stepped through the door, we were amazed at the elaborate ceremony taking place. We thought this would be a good subject for a film, but we didn't think we would be the ones to make it. It was later on in 2005 when we were thinking about setting a drama in a gentrifying neighborhood that the whole idea resurfaced and rapidly took shape. We thought of it in January, wrote it in February, cast it in March and shot it in April.

— Richard Glatzer & Wash Westmoreland

Quinceañera was written and directed by Richard Glatzer and Wash Westmoreland, filmmaking partners and a romantic couple. They conceived the idea for the film in January 2005, based on their own experiences as a white gay couple moving into the predominantly Latino working-class neighborhood of Echo Park, Los Angeles, as the area underwent gentrification.

They were inspired to make a film about the traditional quinceañera celebration after being invited to their fifteen-year-old neighbor's ceremony. With producer Anne Clements, they pitched the idea to three investors—immigrants to the United States from Greece and Israel—who agreed to provide $300,000 to finance the project. (The budget was later raised to $400,000.) Glatzer and Westmoreland then wrote the screenplay over three weeks in February.

Casting for the film took place over March 2005 through the internet, a Los Angeles-based organization for Latino actors, and word of mouth. Glatzer and Westmoreland chose to cast non-union actors; none of the cast except Chalo González belonged to the Screen Actors Guild. Most of the actors were nonprofessional and had never acted in a film before. Emily Rios's only experience before playing the lead role of Magdalena was in a school play, while Jesse Garcia had only acted in commercials.

The film's casting director, Jason L. Wood, ended up playing the character of James, and Glatzer and Westmoreland cast their cleaning lady in a small role. They borrowed props from their cleaner's niece, who had recently had a quinceañera, and mimicked her video of the ceremony to create part of the film. Although the script called for the actors to speak "Spanglish"—a mixture of English and Spanish—neither Glatzer nor Westmoreland were fluent in Spanish, so many of the actors translated their own lines from English. The teenage cast members also improvised dialogue for some scenes and provided their own clothes to wear in character.

The film was shot over eighteen days in April 2005. It was filmed on location in Echo Park inside Glatzer and Westmoreland's house and in three houses on their block that their neighbors allowed them to use for little or no money. Many of Glatzer and Westmoreland's Echo Park neighbors also stood in as extras. Due to California's child labor laws, they could only film with the underage cast members for six hours a day, so cinematographer Eric Steelberg used a hand-held camera with few accessories to maximize the time they could spend filming. Steelberg filmed the project in high-definition video format, which was converted to film during post-production. The film's soundtrack included reggaeton songs as well as music composed by Westmoreland's brother as a favor since the filmmakers could afford little else. Robin Katz finished editing the film in August 2005.

== Release ==
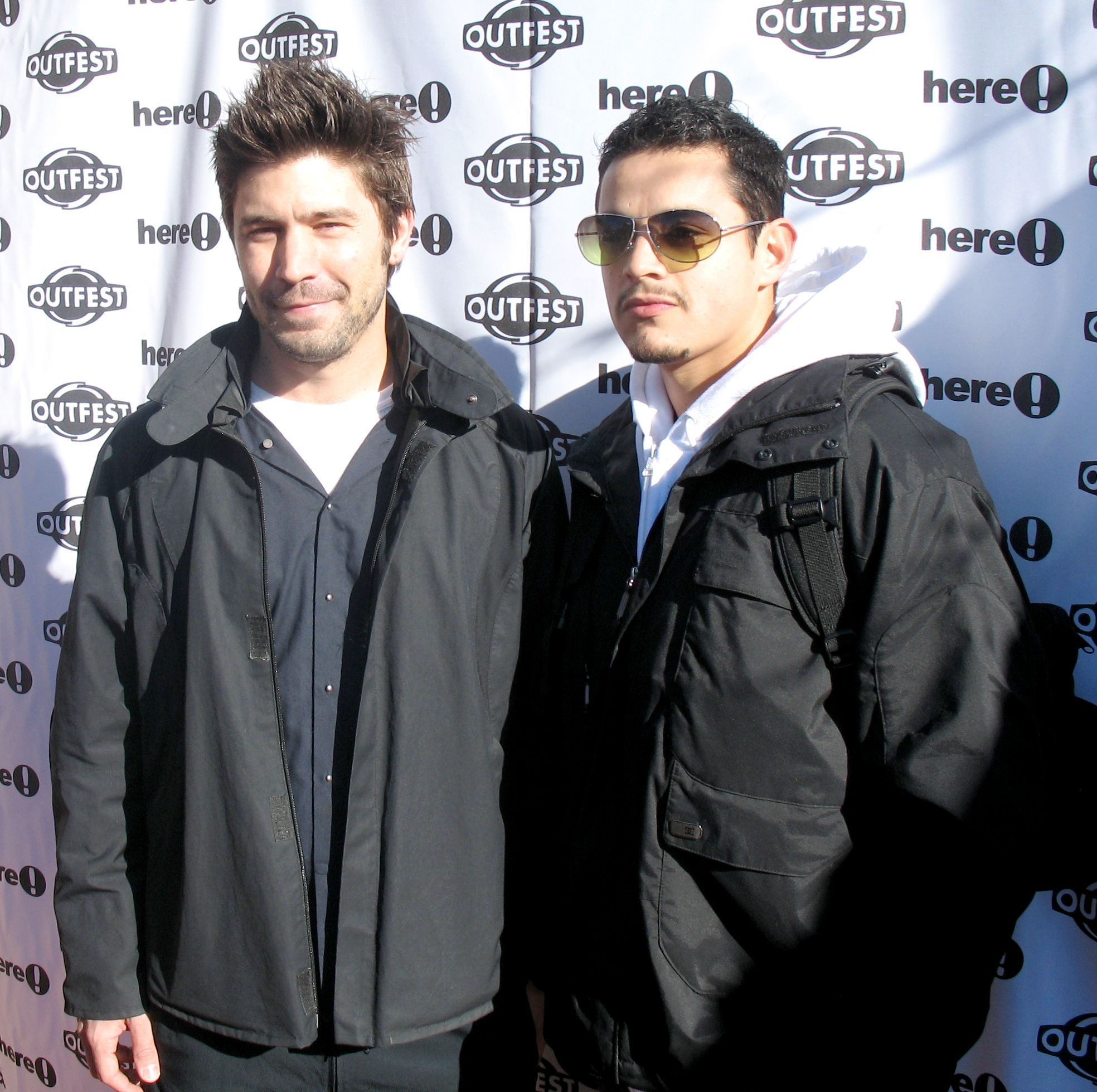
David W. Ross and Jesse Garcia at the Sundance Film Festival, where Quinceañera premiered, in January 2006

Quinceañera premiered on January 23, 2006, at the Sundance Film Festival, where it won both the Grand Jury Prize and the Audience Award in the dramatic feature category. Its U.S. distribution rights were bought by Sony Pictures Classics while its international rights were purchased by Celluloid Dreams. The film was later screened at the Berlin International Film Festival before its theatrical release.

The film opened in limited release in the United States on August 4, 2006, earning $95,400 on its opening weekend from eight theatres. It gradually expanded over the next three weeks, achieving a widest release of 96 theatres by its fourth weekend. Its theatrical run lasted for 14 weeks, concluding with a total gross of $1,692,693. It grossed $830,094 internationally, making a total box office gross of $2,522,787.

It was released in DVD format on January 9, 2007. Extra features on the DVD included an audio commentary with Glatzer, Westmoreland and the film's actors, a "making-of" featurette, and a mock quinceañera home video made by Glatzer and Westmoreland.

== Reception ==
=== Critical response ===
Quinceañera received generally positive reviews from critics. On Rotten Tomatoes, the film holds a rating of 86%, based on 95 reviews, with an average rating of 7.1/10. The site's consensus reads, "This slice-of-life story of a teenage girl in Echo Park is both a sweet crowd-pleaser and a perceptive look at socioeconomic community issues." On Metacritic, the film has a score of 72 out of 100, based on reviews from 31 critics, indicating "generally favorable reviews".

Variety critic David Rooney summarized Quinceañera as "a fresh, spirited drama, charming and unpretentious" as well as a "small gem of a movie with a stirring soul". He praised the "subdued, natural performances" of the inexperienced teenaged actors as well as Chalo González's portrayal of Tomas. Stephen Holden of The New York Times described the film as "smart and warmhearted" with "a wonderfully organic feel for the fluid interaction of cultures and generations" in Los Angeles. Slate's Dana Stevens commended the film for avoiding clichés and for its "sharp-eyed analysis of class conflict". She singled out the performance of Emily Rios, who she said "carries the movie on her square broad shoulders".

Claudia Puig of USA Today awarded the film three out of four stars and described it as "spirited and poignant", with Rios' performance providing "the heart of the film". Wesley Morris, writing for The Boston Globe, found the film to be "a modest but remarkably poignant comedy" and believed that, despite the predictability of the broader story, "somehow it feels authentic in all its small details". The San Francisco Chronicle's Ruthe Stein commented that the film was "directed with obvious love" by Glatzer and Westmoreland and commended González for his "hypnotic performance" as Tomas. Gianni Truzzi, who reviewed the film for the Seattle Post-Intelligencer, wrote of its "charm, sensitivity and intelligence" as well as the "great authenticity" of Rios's portrayal of Magdalena.

Conversely, Lisa Schwarzbaum of Entertainment Weekly, who gave the film a C grade, found the plot "contrived" and melodramatic, and summarized it as "suds being sold as ethno-sensitive reality".. Emanuel Levy, who awarded the film a C+ grade, was also critical: Wearing its heart on its sleeves, "Quinceanera" is a crowd-pleasing indie that elevates the Latino characters to a saintly mythic level and depicts most of the white characters in a stereotypical manner www.EmanuelLevy.com.'The Christian Science Monitor's Peter Rainer felt that the Quinceañera "is best approached with lowered expectations", and that despite being "heartfelt and well-observed" it failed to adequately explore its contrasting themes of race, sexuality and religion.

=== Awards and nominations ===
Awards
Award	Category	Recipient(s) or nominee(s)	Result
ALMA Awards	Outstanding Motion Picture		Nominated
ALMA Awards	Outstanding Actor – Motion Picture	Jesse Garcia	Won
ALMA Awards	Outstanding Actress – Motion Picture	Emily Rios	Nominated
Atlanta Film Festival	Best Narrative Feature		Nominated
Atlanta Film Festival	Best Actor	Chalo González	Nominated
Casting Society of America	Best Independent Feature Film Casting	Jason L. Wood	Nominated
GLAAD Media Awards	Outstanding Film – Limited Release		Won
Humanitas Prize	Sundance Feature Film	Richard Glatzer, Wash Westmoreland	Won
Imagen Awards	Best Picture		Nominated
Imagen Awards	Best Director – Film	Richard Glatzer, Wash Westmoreland	Nominated
Imagen Awards	Best Actor – Film	Jesse Garcia	Nominated
Imagen Awards	Best Actress – Film	Emily Rios	Nominated
Imagen Awards	Best Supporting Actor - Film	Chalo González	Nominated
Independent Spirit Awards	John Cassavetes Award	Anne Clements, Richard Glatzer, Wash Westmoreland	Won
Independent Spirit Awards	Producers Award	Anne Clements	Nominated
Sundance Film Festival	Grand Jury Prize – Dramatic		Won
Sundance Film Festival	Audience Award – Dramatic		Won
Young Artist Awards	Best Leading Young Actress in a Feature Film	Emily Rios	Nominated

Awards
Preceded by Forty Shades of Blue	Sundance Grand Jury Prize: U.S. Dramatic; 2006	Succeeded by Padre Nuestro
