= Flamin' Hot =

2023 film directed by Eva Longoria

- Promotional release poster
- Directed by: Eva Longoria
- Screenplay by: Linda Yvette Chávez; Lewis Colick
- Based on: A Boy, a Burrito and a Cookie: From Janitor to Executive by Richard Montañez and the life stories of Richard and Judy Montañez
- Produced by: DeVon Franklin
- Starring: Jesse Garcia; Annie Gonzalez; Dennis Haysbert; Tony Shalhoub
- Cinematography: Federico Cantini
- Edited by: Liza D. Espinas; Kayla Emter
- Music by: Marcelo Zarvos
- Production companies: Searchlight Pictures; Franklin Entertainment
- Distributed by: Hulu; Disney+
- Release dates: March 11, 2023 (SXSW); June 9, 2023 (United States)
- Running time: 99 minutes
- Country: United States
- Languages: English; Spanish

Flamin' Hot is a 2023 American biographical comedy-drama film directed by Eva Longoria in her feature-length directorial debut. Written by Linda Yvette Chávez and Lewis Colick, it is based on the memoir A Boy, a Burrito and a Cookie: From Janitor to Executive by Richard Montañez, who claims to have invented Flamin' Hot Cheetos. The film stars Jesse Garcia, Annie Gonzalez, Dennis Haysbert, and Tony Shalhoub.

The film had its world premiere at South by Southwest on March 11, 2023. It was released on June 9, 2023, by Hulu and Disney+ to mostly positive reviews from critics. At the 96th Academy Awards, Flamin' Hot received a nomination for Best Original Song for "The Fire Inside" written by Diane Warren, but lost to “What Was I Made For?” from Barbie.

== Plot ==
In 1966 Southern California, Richard Montañez grows up as a hard-working child with a strict father and supportive grandfather. He meets his future wife Judy in school where he sells burritos to other children. He is arrested at a young age when nobody believes that he earned his money honestly. As adults, Richard and Judy marry but live as hoodlums in a gang, hustling to survive. They make an effort to turn their lives around once Judy gets pregnant with their first child. After one last arrest, the judge tells him to change his way of life. A second child later, Richard and his family struggle to make ends meet. Richard turns to his friend, former hoodlum Tony Romero, who helps him get a job at Frito-Lay. Despite lying on his resumé, he is hired by floor head Lonny Mason.

Richard pays attention to the nuances of the factory and asks engineer maintenance leader Clarence C. Baker to teach him about the machines. Baker teaches Richard how to operate all the machinery in the factory. Unfortunately, the Reagan administration severely affects low-paying jobs, and Frito-Lay's stocks go down. This results in some of the workers getting laid off. Frito-Lay CEO Roger Enrico releases a video encouraging the workers to "think like a CEO," which inspires Richard.

He takes his kids out for elotes (Mexican street corn). Noticing that his youngest son Steven likes the spicy flavor, he realizes that the way to save Frito-Lay is to pitch the brand to the Latino market. He convinces Baker and the rest of his coworkers to let him take some unflavored Cheetos home, but Judy suggests that he talk to his father Vacho first about a job. Vacho belittles Richard's plans, causing Judy to support Richard even more. The Montañezes work tirelessly trying to find the perfect spicy flavor for Cheetos, eventually getting the right concoction. Richard attempts to pitch his idea to Lonny only to be turned down, forcing him to sneak in and copy Enrico's phone number.

Richard gets through to Enrico, who is intrigued to learn that he saw his video and asks that he send his flavored Cheetos. He tastes them and is hooked, setting up a meeting at the factory. Richard speaks from the heart, and his pitch is accepted with the Flamin' Hot Cheetos being put into production. While this results in more jobs, the new flavor is not flying off the shelves. Richard's children point out that there are no advertisements for the flavor. Richard returns to work and implores everyone to use their skills to sell the new flavor from the street. The tactic works, and Enrico calls to ask that the factory produce an even bigger order.

While Baker gets the promotion he always desired, Richard is still a janitor. Lonny asks Richard to clean upstairs, only to find Enrico, who tells him that he understands his struggles growing up before revealing that he has been promoted to Director of Multicultural Marketing. Richard is applauded by his coworkers and happily calls Judy to tell her the good news.

== Cast ==
- Jesse Garcia as Richard Montañez
- Annie Gonzalez as Judy Montañez
- Emilio Rivera as Vacho Montañez
- Vanessa Martinez as Concha Montañez
- Hunter Jones as Lucky Montañez
- Dennis Haysbert as Clarence C. Baker
- Tony Shalhoub as Roger Enrico
- Pepe Serna as Abuelito
- Bobby Soto as Tony Romero
- Jimmy Gonzales as Hector Morales
- Matt Walsh as Lonny Mason
- Brice Gonzalez as Steven Montañez
- Peter Diseth as James Finley

== Production ==
In August 2019, it was reported Eva Longoria would direct Flamin' Hot, a film about Richard Montañez who claimed to have invented Flamin' Hot Cheetos, with DeVon Franklin producing under his Franklin Entertainment banner alongside Samuel Rodriguez, who served as the executive producer. Searchlight Pictures (then-named Fox Searchlight Pictures) also contributed to the making of this film.

Prior to the announcement, in April 2019, Franklin Entertainment was informed by Frito-Lay that Montañez's account of inventing Flamin' Hot Cheetos was disputed after an internal investigation had been prompted the previous year, but the producers elected to continue with the original premise. The script received rewrites prior to shooting due to the publication of a Los Angeles Times article in May 2021 disputing Montañez's account.

In May 2021, Jesse Garcia and Annie Gonzalez joined the cast of the film. The film completed production in August 2021, and the cast was announced at that time.

== Historical accuracy ==
Though Flamin' Hot is advertised as a true story, the authenticity of Montañez's account became doubtful after the Los Angeles Times published an in-depth article scrutinizing his claim, with later corroboration by NPR.

=== Creation of Flamin' Hot Cheetos ===
As portrayed in the film, Montañez claims to have been encouraged by Roger Enrico's "think like a CEO" message and invented the Flamin' Hot seasoning with his wife Judy as a DIY project, taking home unflavored Cheetos in garbage bags to experiment with when the machine broke and left them unseasoned. Montañez previously stated Enrico's phone number was listed in the company directory. He called Enrico, pitching his idea for a product aimed at Latinos, and arranged a sales presentation where he handed out homemade bags sealed with a clothing iron and hand-drawn logos. The presentation and a test market in Los Angeles happened in 1991, before a nationwide release in 1992. Reporting by the LA Times and NPR contradicts this account. Frito-Lay told the LA Times, "We value Richard's many contributions to our company, especially his insights into Hispanic consumers, but we do not credit the creation of Flamin' Hot Cheetos or any Flamin' Hot products to him," NPR was told, "We do not credit the product creation to him and him alone." McCormick developed the Flamin' Hot seasoning and sent initial samples to Frito-Lay on Dec. 15, 1989. Frito-Lay filed a trademark for Flamin' Hot in June 1990 and started testing spicy Lay's, Cheetos, Fritos and Bakenets in Chicago, Detroit and Houston beginning in August 1990, and Roger Enrico joined Frito-Lay at the start of 1991. Lynne Greenfeld is credited with managing the team that developed Flamin' Hot Cheetos, with contributions from Fred Lindsay. According to Al Carey, a former executive at Frito-Lay, and Patti Reuff, Enrico's former assistant, Montañez pitched a similar product, but this could not have been before 1992. Carey stated the product was approved and sold in California using seasoning from the Midwest. Montañez did in fact rise from a floor-level position to marketing executive, and he was involved in pitching new products such as Flamin' Hot Popcorn in 1993 followed by two types of Fritos — Flamin' Hot and Lime and Chile Corn Chips. Roberto Siewczynski, who worked with Frito-Lay as a Latino-focused consultant, clarified that events Montañez has described actually took place during the Sabrositas test market in 1994.

=== Other details and responses ===
Montañez has said he was a janitor during the development of Flamin' Hot Cheetos and is portrayed as such in the film, but he had actually been a machinist operator since 1977. The movie presents an economic downturn during Ronald Reagan's presidency leading to layoffs and prompting Enrico's message. In reality, the United States experienced a recession in the early 1980s that began prior to the 1980 presidential election, followed by consistent economic growth and decreasing unemployment until July 1990. Roger Enrico joined Frito-Lay in early 1991, two years after Reagan left office. Frito-Lay cut 1800 jobs later that year.

Clarence Baker, played by Dennis Haysbert, was based on a co-worker Montañez had at the plant. He died several years before production of the film and a different name was used for the character.

Montañez initially responded to the controversy by claiming he was pushed out of development before the test markets and his contributions were not documented due to his low level position at the time. He stated, "I think that [the film is] going to inspire people to do the right thing. Don't make the mistake Montañez made. Document everything." The week of the movie's release, Variety published an article where Montañez stated, "I've got letters, notes, and presentations, proving their faith in me and my creation," but did not make any documentation public. Co-writer Lewis Colick has stated, "I think enough of the story is true," adding, "I've written a lot of true stories, like October Sky. Not every single thing in the story is exactly true. I always stand behind the essence of the story." Director Eva Longoria responded to criticism of the movie's accuracy, "We've always been telling Richard Montañez's story, and we're telling his truth. We weren't making a movie about the history of the Flamin' Hot Cheeto. We're telling the story of Richard Montañez." She separately admitted that the scene where Montañez's coworkers clap and cheer for his promotion is "the one thing that did not happen." Addressing a screening of the film at the White House, an official speaking anonymously stated it is not a documentary, and was shown to reflect Americans of different backgrounds.

== Release ==
Flamin' Hot had its world premiere at 2023 South by Southwest Film & TV Festival (SXSW) on March 11, 2023. It was released in select theaters and on both Hulu and Disney+ on June 9, 2023. The movie was screened on the South Lawn of the White House on June 15, 2023. President Joe Biden and director Eva Longoria, a notable Democrat campaigner, delivered remarks at the event, promoting it as the first White House screening of a movie focused on Hispanic characters.

== Reception ==
=== Viewership ===
Whip Media, which tracks viewership data for the more than 25 million worldwide users of its TV Time app, calculated that Flamin' Hot was the seventh most-streamed film in the U.S. during the week of June 11, 2023. The film moved to ninth place a week later. The streaming aggregator Reelgood, which monitors real-time data from 5 million users in the U.S. for original and acquired streaming programs and movies across subscription video-on-demand (SVOD) and ad-supported video-on-demand (AVOD) services, reported that Flamin' Hot was the tenth most-streamed program during the week of June 8, 2023. Reelgood later reported that the film placed ninth the following week. Searchlight Pictures announced that Flamin' Hot became the studio's most-watched streaming movie of all time in June 2023.

=== Critical response ===
On the review aggregator website Rotten Tomatoes, 69% of 127 critics' reviews are positive, with an average rating of 6.1/10. The website's consensus reads: "Flamin' Hot may have a little more than its share of empty calories, but this fun feel-good story is still a decent cinematic snack." Metacritic, which uses a weighted average, assigned the film a score of 58 out of 100, based on 31 critics, indicating "mixed or average" reviews.

Carlos Aguilar of Los Angeles Times said, "Flamin' Hot turns out to be a surprisingly enjoyable crowd-pleaser. It mostly works because Garcia, Gonzalez and Longoria agree on a poignant, yet not sanctimonious approach that crystallizes the specific fortitude of mining hope from dire struggle." Brian Lowry of CNN said that Eva Longoria did an "admirable job of wringing as much mileage as she can out of this underdog tale," and wrote, "Playfully presented, it's the kind of mildly tasty cinematic snack that doesn't exactly stick to your ribs."

John Nugent of Empire gave the film a grade of three out of five stars, praised the performances of Jesse Garcia and Annie Gonzalez, and complimented Eva Longoria's direction. Clarisse Loughrey of The Independent gave Flamin' Hot a grade of three out of five stars, complimented the chemistry between Jesse Garcia and Annie Gonzales, and stated that the film " keep its audience on their toes" owing to Eva Longoria.

Brian Tallerico of RogerEbert.com wrote: "Flamin' Hot has so much to say about culture that it never gives its characters room to breathe outside the movie's 'message.' It makes for a film that doesn't seem to tell a true story as much as one that came off a product line from a Frito-Lay factory." Monica Castillo, also writing for RogerEbert.com, gave the movie two out of four stars: "Overall, Flamin' Hot is more cheesy than spicy. Its focus on the 'Si, se puede ... trabajar y ganar dinero' mantra dulls the flavors of what makes the movie enjoyable: the family at the center of Richard's drive to survive."

=== Accolades ===
Award	Date of ceremony	Category	Recipient(s)	Result	Ref.
Palm Springs International Film Festival	January 16, 2023	Directors to Watch	Eva Longoria	Won	
South by Southwest	March 19, 2023	Audience Award – Headliners	Flamin' Hot	Won	
Hollywood Music in Media Awards	November 15, 2023	Original Song — Feature Film	"The Fire Inside" – Diane Warren	Nominated	
Imagen Awards	December 3, 2023	Best Feature Film	Flamin' Hot	Won	
Imagen Awards	December 3, 2023	Best Director	Eva Longoria	Won	
Imagen Awards	December 3, 2023	Best Actor	Jesse Garcia	Won	
Imagen Awards	December 3, 2023	Best Actress	Annie Gonzalez	Nominated	
Celebration of Cinema & Television	December 4, 2023	Breakthrough Director Award (Film)	Eva Longoria	Won	
Society of Composers and Lyricists Awards	February 13, 2024	Outstanding Original Song for a Comedy or Musical Visual Media Production	"The Fire Inside" – Diane Warren	Nominated	
Satellite Awards	March 3, 2024	Best Original Song	"The Fire Inside" – Diane Warren	Nominated	
Academy Awards	March 10, 2024	Best Original Song	"The Fire Inside" – Diane Warren	Nominated	
