= Annie Gonzalez =

American actress

- Born: Los Angeles, California
- Occupation: Actress
- Years active: 2002–present
- Website: https://www.imdb.com/name/nm1638069/

Annie Gonzalez is an American actress. She is best known for playing Lidia Solis in the comedy drama series Gentefied and Nora in the sitcom Leanne.

== Early life ==
Gonzalez was born in Los Angeles, California to Mexican parents. She grew up not wanting to be Mexican due to getting remarks off people like you are a gardener or you clean houses. It wasn't until she attended East Los Angeles College where she got comfortable about her culture and realised how beautiful it was.

== Career ==
One of her first appearances came as a dancer in the film The JammX Kids. She has also made appearances in shows such as Showtime's Shameless, FX's American Horror Story and Amazon's Good Girls. Her first big role came playing Lidia Solis in the comedy drama series Gentefied. She was the winner of the inaugural Latin Heat Rising Star Award in 2021. Her biggest role so far has been playing Nora in the sitcom Leanne.

== Personal life ==
She is also a talented singer and has previously sung with the band Quetzal. She has her own YouTube channel which is dedicated to promoting spirituality, self-love, positivity and living life as a Latina.

== Filmography ==
=== Film ===
Year	Title	Role	Notes
2002	Esmeralda	Esmeralda	Short
2004	The JammX Kids	Annie	
2007	Girl Camp	Camper	Short
2008	Ninja Cheerleaders	Girl Scout	
2014	How to Break Up with Someone on Vine	Maria	Short
2016	Beauty School	Helga	
2017	A Violent Man	Server	
2018	Cafe Abundance	Ashley	Short
2019	Spies in Disguise	Additional Voice	
2021	East of the Mountains	Anita Romero	
2021	Mama Retreat	Mercedes	Short
2022	The Edge of Her Mind Anthology	Ashley	
2023	Flamin' Hot	Judy Montanez	
2023	Illegally Brown	Luna	Short
2024	Drive-Away Dolls	Carla	
2024	The Bad Shepherd	Megan	
2024	Body Language	Fay	
2024	A Heart for Christmas	Krystal Kane	
2024	Jenni	Jenni Rivera	
2026	Fade to Black	Victoria Barrera	
2026	Relationship Goals	Treese Moore	

=== Television ===
Year	Title	Role	Notes
2002–2003	Comedy Kids	Various Characters	5 episodes
2003	Without a Trace	Jammin	Episode: "A Three Falls"
2015	The Grounded	Jackie	Episode: "Dexter Destroys TV"
2017	I Want My Phone Back	Contestant	Episode: "Bother of the Bride"
2017	American Horror Story	Demonstrator	Episode: "Charles (Manson) in Charge"
2018	Legion	Cheerleader #3	Episode: "Chapter 11"
2018	Pink Collar Crimes	Roxane	Episode: "Minivan Mom Bank Robber"
2019	Shameless	Danica	Episode: "The Apple Doesn't Fall Far from the Alibi"
2019	Good Girls	Jan	Episode: "I'd Rather Be Crafting"
2020	Gentefied	Lidia Solis	9 episodes
2019–2020	Vida	Amanda	2 episodes
2021	Mr. Corman	Martha Padilla	Episode: "Mr. Corman"
2021	Go Off with Jess & Julissa	Rogue, Charlotte	2 episodes
2024	After We Wrap	Herself	Episode: "Annie Gonzalez"
2024	Doctor Odyssey	Deyja	Episode: "I Always Cry at Weddings"
2024	Lopez vs Lopez	Annie	2 episodes
2025	Leanne	Nora	3 episodes
2025	The Prophecy	Rosalinda	8 episodes
2026	Bucktown	Jessie	Episode: "Pilot"
2026	Once Upon a Time in Aztlan	Dolores Duran	Episode: "#1.1"
