= DeVon Franklin =

American film producer and writer (born 1978)

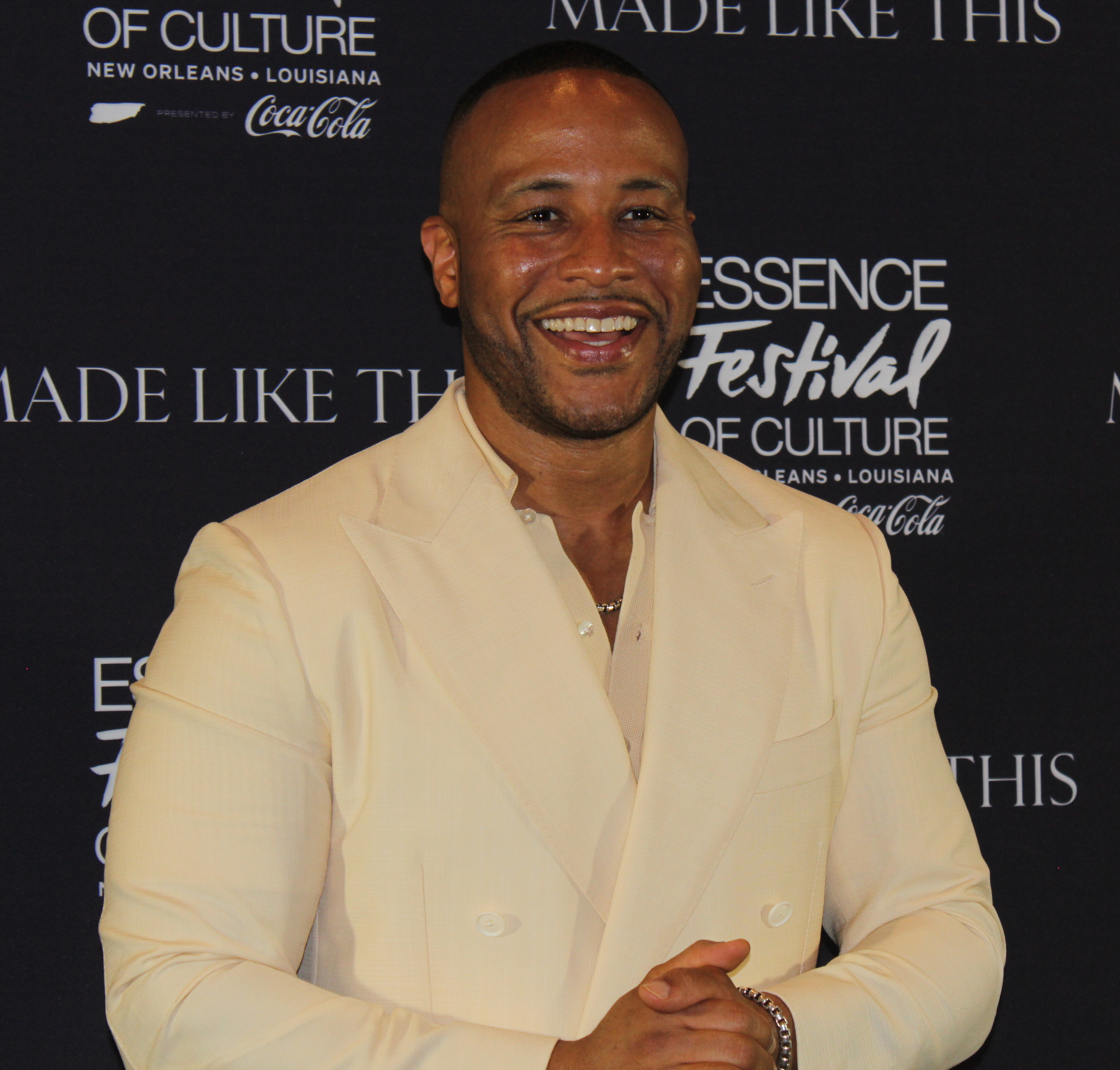
- DeVon Franklin at 2025 Essence Festival of Culture.
- Born: April 13, 1978 (age 48); Oakland, California, U.S.
- Education: University of Southern California
- Occupations: Producer, actor, author, television personality
- Works: Produced by Faith, The Wait, The Hollywood Commandments
- Spouses: Meagan Good (m. 2012; div. 2022) Maria Castillo (m. 2025)

DeVon Franklin (born April 13, 1978) is an American producer, actor, author, and television personality. He is best known for the films Miracles from Heaven, Heaven Is for Real, and The New York Times Best Seller book The Wait, which he co-wrote with his then-wife Meagan Good.

== Early life ==
Franklin was raised in Oakland, California, the son of Donald Ray Franklin and Paulette Franklin. Franklin has two brothers, Donald Ray and David Brandon. The couple would ultimately separate, and Paulette and her three young boys moved into her parents' home. A few years later, Franklin's father died at the age of 36 after suffering a heart attack. His mother, grandmother and her seven sisters formed what Franklin has called a "coalition" of strong women that guided him and his brothers in the absence of their father.

In a 2016 Mother's Day essay, Franklin wrote of his upbringing: "While she did make sure we had strong males in our life, like my grandfather and my pastor (who was also my uncle), my mother wanted to give us something more than that. My mother's answer was to bring together a coalition of women, the same women who she was raised with…. They were always an integral part of her life and naturally became an integral part of our life too, even more so after my father died. These nine women (my mother, Grandmother, Aunt Nuna, Aunt Jayne, Aunt Ida, Aunt Enis, Aunt Chrystal, Aunt Donna and Aunt Sondra) were not only the village that would raise us, but also formed the foundation of who we would become as men."

Following his father's death, Franklin threw himself into academics and activities as means of coping with the loss. This would ultimately lead to his interest in theater and his passion for movies and television. As a teenager, he would study different movies and television shows to figure out how stories and scenes were put together in the hope of understanding how to move and inspire people through entertainment, the way The Cosby Show and The Color Purple had inspired him. During this time, he also began helping out at his uncle's church and preached his first sermon at the age of 15.

== Education ==
Franklin graduated from the University of Southern California in 2000 with a major in business administration and a minor in Cinema-Television.

== Career ==
=== Early career ===
Franklin began his career while a student at University of Southern California as an intern at Overbrook Entertainment, working for Will Smith and James Lassiter. Upon graduation from USC, Franklin accepted a full-time position at Overbrook. Following this, he worked in Tracey Edmonds's company Edmonds Entertainment as a junior executive.

=== Studio positions ===
Franklin made the transition into Hollywood's studio system in 2003 when he took up a creative executive position at Metro-Goldwyn-Mayer. In his book, Produced by Faith, Franklin describes his time at MGM as critical in reaffirming his passion for filmmaking thanks to the creative input his new role afforded him in helping contribute to projects like John Travolta's 2005 crime-comedy Be Cool. "Following my policy of trying to add value and contribute wherever possible, I managed to make an impact despite being the lowest man on the corporate ladder."

His time at MGM, however, would be short-lived. In 2005, following months of rumors, Sony Pictures Entertainment bought out MGM. Following the sale, Franklin was offered a position and brought on as a Director of Development at Sony's Columbia Pictures.

In his new role at Columbia, Franklin oversaw a number of the studio's successful films, such as The Pursuit of Happyness, Hancock and Seven Pounds. His work on these projects led to a promotion to VP at Columbia, but also brought him full circle back to collaborating with his former boss and mentor from Overbrook Entertainment.

In an interview with Millennial magazine, Franklin discussed how The Pursuit of Happyness showed him what was possible for his work within Hollywood and so drove him to make films that trigger audiences to go after something. He explained: "I want people's hearts to be touched, their lives to be touched, and I want the evidence of that to show up at the box office."

During his time as VP at Columbia Pictures, Franklin supervised a variety of films. He helped produce The Pink Panther 2, the faith-based film Not Easily Broken, The Ugly Truth, and Whitney Houston's Sparkle (released in 2012). Not only did he champion box-office hits like The Karate Kid and Jumping the Broom, he was also recognized as one of the youngest and most influential executives under 35 years of age by The Hollywood Reporter. He was also given the title of a Top 10 Industry Impact Player by the NAACP.

In 2012, following these sweeping successes, Franklin continued to rise in the ranks at Columbia, becoming Senior Vice President of Production, which made him one of the youngest people in the industry to hold such a position. In this position, Franklin developed and supervised production of new commercial material, and honed his focus for urban and faith-based markets with films like the diversified remake of Annie and the sleeper hit Heaven Is For Real.

One of Franklin's first projects as Senior VP was adapting the New York Times bestseller Heaven Is for Real into a feature-length film. Reading the book in one sitting, Franklin was immediately engrossed by the material and the message; he helped develop the script and oversaw the entire project. "[I wanted the movie to be] a message of peace to those who have lost loved ones and who may be wondering what happens next", he stated. Having lost his own father at a very young age, DeVon wanted audience members who could relate to the Burpo family to walk away with a sense of hope, peace and inspiration. Produced on a modest $12 million budget, Heaven Is for Real outpaced all industry estimates and grossed more than $100 million at the box office, making it one of the highest-grossing faith-based films of all time.

One of Franklin's final projects during his time as a studio executive was the reimagining of the classic story Annie. Franklin served as an executive on the project alongside Sony's Ange Giannetti, who Franklin has since called a mentor in his time at the studio. In his role as an executive on the film, he developed the script, put the movie together, oversaw production, and even helped promote the film when it was being released.

In promoting the film, Franklin noted that what made the film unique is that "for the first time, we're doing Annie with a diverse cast, and capturing modern day New York with a different flavor. When you see the story, the whole idea of Annie believing that one day she will find her parents, and ultimately finding her family in a way that she never anticipated. I think that story is very resonant for today, as it has been for previous generations. Because Annie is one of those classic stories that throughout generations has always been a phenomenal story about faith, about the power of connection and community, and about family. This reimagining of the classic tale is going to be as relevant for this generation as it has been for previous generations."

=== Franklin Entertainment ===
Franklin started Franklin Entertainment in July 2014, with a first-look production deal at Sony Pictures Entertainment. Franklin Entertainment is a multimedia entertainment company in which Franklin currently serves as president and CEO. In 2016, the company signed a new multi-year, first-look, production deal with 20th Century Fox, where it is now based.

In 2016, Franklin produced the hit film Miracles from Heaven, based on the book Miracles from Heaven by Christy Beam. This American Christian drama stars Jennifer Garner, Queen Latifah, Kylie Rogers, Martin Henderson, John Carroll Lynch, and Eugenio Derbez. The movie recounts the true story of Beam's daughter who had a rare, incurable disease, but after a freak accident is miraculously cured. The movie was made for $13 million, and, although getting mixed reviews from critics, it grossed $73 million at the box office worldwide. It was nominated for Favorite Dramatic Movie in the People's Choice Awards, Best Actress in the Teen Choice Awards, and won the award for Best Movie for Drama in the Teen Choice Awards Choice .

Franklin executive-produced the animated film The Star, for Sony Pictures Animation. The Star was directed by Oscar nominee Timothy Reckart. This faith-based film inspired by the Nativity Story focuses on a donkey and his friends on an adventure as they follow The Star and become accidental heroes. The Star was released in 2017 and featured the voice of Kelly Clarkson as Leah the Horse, Oprah Winfrey as Deborah, Tyler Perry as Cyrus, Steven Yeun as Bo the donkey, Aidy Bryant as Ruth the sheep, Keegan-Michael Key, Kristin Chenoweth, Anthony Anderson, Gabriel Iglesias, Ving Rhames, Deliah Rene, Kris Kristofferson, Gina Rodriguez, Zachary Levi, Christopher Plummer, and Tracy Morgan.

Franklin also has several film projects in the works, including Breakthrough, for 20th Century Studios, which tells the true story of John Smith who at 14 drowned in Lake St. Louis and was unresponsive for nearly an hour. Smith's mother entered the room praying loudly and suddenly Smith had a pulse. He is also producing the film adaptation of the recently released memoir from Cathy Byrd The Boy Who Knew Too Much. Franklin is also at work on the reboot of He-Man and the Masters of the Universe franchise with Columbia Pictures, as well as the remake of the film Cooley High with Common at MGM. On the TV side, Franklin is producing a re-imagining of Foxy Brown at Hulu starring his then-wife Meagan Good.

=== Preacher and TV personality ===
According to Franklin, he began preaching at the age of 15. He is a regular on The Dr. Oz Show, offering his guidance on a range of topics including faith, relationships and spiritual wellness. He has made appearances on Dr. Phil, CBS This Morning, Entertainment Tonight, Oprah's Super Soul Sunday, and was named to Oprah's SuperSoul100 list of visionaries and influential leaders.

== Works ==
Franklin is the author of two best-selling books, Produced by Faith: Enjoy Real Success without Losing Your True Self and the New York Times best-seller The Wait: A Powerful Practice for Finding the Love of Your Life and the Life You Love. His book The Hollywood Commandments: A Spiritual Guide to Secular Success was released in 2017.

=== Produced by Faith ===
Produced by Faith: Enjoy Real Success without Losing Your True Self was released in June 2012 and emphasizes how faith, life and work all interact and are parallel. The book is a dynamic business model for building a thriving career without compromising your faith. In an interview with Deadline Hollywood, Franklin says: "The idea of the book is, you don't have to compromise your faith to pursue your career dreams." Franklin shows how to discover The Big Idea for your life, take your career to the next level, recognize the signs God sends you that indicate when it's time to move in a new direction, stand firm on your Christian principles without compromise, and choose a profession, industry, or company that is in tune with your purpose.

=== The Wait ===
Franklin co-wrote his second book, The Wait: A Powerful Practice for Finding the Love of Your Life and the Life You Love, with his then-wife Meagan Good. The book was released in February 2016 and quickly became a New York Times bestseller in several categories. In the book, the couple share their personal love story, and the message that waiting until marriage can help you find the person you are meant to be with. The book describes the most important moments from their relationship and advice on how waiting can transform relationships. KTTV says The Wait"…talks about finding true love through celibacy, as well as the benefits of delayed gratification in all walks of life (professional, personal, spiritual etc). They use their own personal story of waiting as an example."

=== The Hollywood Commandments ===
The Hollywood Commandments: A Spiritual Guide to Secular Success was released in September 2017. The book, published by HarperOne, is described as one that will encourage readers to pursue their passion in every area of life, including career, relationships, and faith.

=== The Truth About Men ===
In 2019, he published The Truth About Men: What Men and Women Need to Know.

== Personal life ==
Franklin is a Seventh-day Adventist. He currently lives in Los Angeles. In 2011, he began dating actress Meagan Good, whom he married on June 16, 2012, in Malibu, California. The couple stated they remained chaste prior to their marriage. In December 2021, it was announced that Franklin had filed for divorce after nine years of marriage. Their divorce was finalized in June 2022.

In 2024, Franklin began dating celebrity trainer Maria Castillo, whom he married on August 2, 2025, at Casa Lago Beverly Hills in California.

== Recognition ==
Beliefnet called him one of the "Most Influential Christians Under 40", Variety magazine named him one of the "Top 10 Producers to Watch", and Ebony magazine has named him one of the "Top 100 Influential African-Americans in America".

== Filmography ==
- Divorced Sistas
- Heaven Is for Real
- Miracles from Heaven
- Breakthrough
- The Pursuit of Happyness
- The Star
- Jesus Revolution
- Flamin' Hot
- On Fire
- King of the South
- Untitled Kirk Franklin Project
- Masters of the Universe
