= Fathers and Daughters =

2015 drama film by Gabriele Muccino

- Theatrical release poster
- Directed by: Gabriele Muccino
- Written by: Brad Desch
- Produced by: Nicolas Chartier; Sherryl Clark; Craig J. Flores
- Starring: Russell Crowe; Amanda Seyfried; Aaron Paul; Diane Kruger; Quvenzhané Wallis; Bruce Greenwood; Jane Fonda; Octavia Spencer
- Cinematography: Shane Hurlbut
- Edited by: Alex Rodríguez
- Music by: Paolo Buonvino
- Production companies: Lakeshore Entertainment; Andrea Leone Films; Busted Shark Productions; Fear of God Films; Voltage Pictures
- Distributed by: Vertical Entertainment; Elevation Pictures
- Release dates: October 1, 2015 (Italy); November 13, 2015 (United Kingdom); July 8, 2016 (United States)
- Running time: 116 minutes
- Countries: United States; Italy
- Language: English
- Budget: $22.4 million
- Box office: $5.1 million

Fathers and Daughters is a 2015 drama film directed by Gabriele Muccino, written by Brad Desch, and starring Russell Crowe, Amanda Seyfried, and Kylie Rogers. The film received mostly negative reviews from critics. It grossed over $5.1 million against a $22.4 million production budget.

== Plot ==
The film is told in alternating segments between the past with Katie as a child with Jake and as a young adult in relationships with others.

Jake Davis is a Pulitzer Prize-winning novelist with a wife and daughter Katie, whom he loves dearly. However, while they're driving home from a party, he argues with his wife over his flirting with a woman (he had cheated on her in the past, causing suspicion). This distracts him, causing their car's collision with a truck.

Jake is injured badly, while his wife dies. His injury leaves him with brain damage, causing him seizures. A doctor warns him he needs treatment, as otherwise they might turn into psychotic episodes. Jake reluctantly agrees, going to a hospital for treatment for seven months while Katie stays with her aunt Elizabeth and uncle William.

Upon his return, Elizabeth and William (who've become quite attached to Katie over her stay with them), propose to adopt her, an idea Jake flatly rejects. He struggles to cope as a single father, however, with his seizures returning (a fact he hides). Due to his brain damage, Jake's writing suffers, resulting in his next book being panned by critics, with his own publishing company choosing not to market it widely.

Due to his difficulties, Elizabeth and William sue Jake for custody, which he fears they can win. He writes an entire book with a burst of inspiration, angering Katie in the process by neglecting her. The lawsuit against Jake is dropped when William is revealed to have impregnated his secretary and Elizabeth files for divorce. Jake manages to finish writing his book Fathers and Daughters, but his seizures later result in his accidental death due to a head injury when he falls in the bathroom. His final book wins him a posthumous Pulitzer.

25 years later, Katie attends graduate school and is studying psychology. It's shown that she's quite promiscuous, taking a guy she's just met into the bathroom and having sex with him. She rebuffs any more intimate relationship.

Katie becomes a social worker and connects with a girl named Lucy. She, like her, has lost her mother and has refused to speak since her death. Katie continues her pattern of one-night stands before meeting Cameron, a man who has idolized her father's work, and they begin a relationship.

With Katie's help, Lucy improves greatly to the point that she's adopted, though Katie is hurt by hearing that they'll have no further contact. Though she grows closer to Cameron, Katie is still dealing with intimacy issues such as being afraid of losing Cameron.

Katie cheats on him, and when Cameron finds out he angrily breaks up with her. Katie goes to his apartment, declaring her love for him, but runs away after seeing another woman inside. When she returns home Cameron is there waiting; they embrace and kiss.

== Cast ==
- Russell Crowe as Jake Davis
- Amanda Seyfried as Katie Davis
  - Kylie Rogers as Young Katie Davis
- Aaron Paul as Cameron
- Diane Kruger as Elizabeth
- Quvenzhané Wallis as Lucy Carter
- Bruce Greenwood as William
- Janet McTeer as Carolyn
- Jane Fonda as Teddy Stanton
- Octavia Spencer as Dr. Korman
- Michelle Veintimilla as Woman at Cameron's Apartment
- Ryan Eggold as John
- Paula Marshall as Laura Garner

== Production ==
=== Development ===
In December 2012, Brad Desch's screenplay Fathers and Daughters was revealed to be on that year's "Black List" of the most-liked unproduced screenplays in Hollywood. Gabriele Muccino was hired to direct during the 2013 Cannes Film Festival. Russell Crowe was the first cast in October, with Amanda Seyfried joining the same month as Crowe's daughter. Kylie Rogers also joined the cast as the younger version of Crowe's daughter.

=== Casting ===
In November, Aaron Paul was cast as Seyfried's love interest. Actresses Diane Kruger, Octavia Spencer, and Quvenzhané Wallis were cast in the film during the Berlin Film Festival. The same month, Janet McTeer was cast. In April 2014, it was announced Jane Fonda, and Bruce Greenwood had joined the cast of the film.

=== Filming ===
Crew members scouted Pittsburgh, Pennsylvania, as a filming location, with production slated for an April start date. Principal photography officially began on March 14 in Pittsburgh.

== Music ==
Michael Bolton sings and wrote the song to this movie.

In May 2014, James Horner was announced to be composing the music for the film, but in September, he was replaced by Paolo Buonvino.

== Release ==
The film was released in Italy on October 1, 2015. It was then released in the United Kingdom on November 13, 2015, by Warner Bros. Vertical Entertainment distributed the film in the U.S. on July 8, 2016.

=== Critical response ===
The film received negative reviews from critics. Review aggregator Rotten Tomatoes reports a rating of 28% based on 50 reviews, with an average rating of 4.24/10; the site's consensus states: "Fathers and Daughters name-brand cast can't cover for a screenplay that makes a half-hearted effort at delving into family dynamics but falls back on melodrama." On Metacritic, the film has a score of 31% from 17 critics, indicating "generally unfavorable" reviews.
