= Kylie Rogers =

American actress (born 2004)

- Born: February 18, 2004 (age 22)
- Occupation: Actress
- Years active: 2012–present

Kylie Rogers (born February 18, 2004) is an American actress best known for playing the role of Minx Lawrence in The Whispers. She also stars as Anna Beam in Miracles from Heaven.

== Career ==
From 2018 to 2024, Rogers had a recurring role as the younger version of the main character Beth Dutton in the American television series Yellowstone.

Alongside acting, Rogers also provided her voice as part of the soundtrack for the film Skin.

In April 2024, Rogers joined Amazon MGM Studios' sci-fi thriller entitled Mercy.

== Filmography ==
Key
†	Denotes films that have not yet been released

=== Film ===
Kylie Rogers' film credits
Year	Title	Role	Notes
2014	Space Station 76	Sunshine	
2014	Boys of Abu Ghraib	Daughter	Uncredited
2014	Finders Keepers	Claire Simon	
2015	Mojave	Sophie	
2015	Fathers and Daughters	Young Katie Davis	
2016	Miracles from Heaven	Anna Beam	
2016	Collateral Beauty	Allison Yardsham	
2018	Skin	Sierra	
2019	Run with the Hunted	Young Peaches	
2022	Cheaper by the Dozen	Ella Baker	
2023	Beau Is Afraid	Toni	
2023	Landscape with Invisible Hand	Chloe Marsh	
2026	Mercy	Britt Raven	

=== Television ===
Kylie Rogers' television credits
Year	Title	Role	Notes
2012	Days of Our Lives	Pamela	Episode: "No. #1.11948"
2012	Private Practice	Sarah Nelson	2 episodes
2013	The List	Lily Dunston	Television film
2013	The Gates	Chloe Baxley	Television film
2013	CSI: Crime Scene Investigation	Molly Goodwin	Episode: "Backfire"
2013	Deadtime Stories	Madison Tyler	Episode: "Terror in Tiny Town"
2013	Mob City	Peggy O'Donnell	2 episodes
2013–2014	Once Upon a Time in Wonderland	Millie	2 episodes
2015	All I Want for Christmas	Rebecca Patterson	Television film
2015	The Whispers	Minx Lawrence	13 episodes
2016	Chicago P.D.	Polly Carlson	Episode: "She's Got Us"
2018–2020, 2022	Yellowstone	Young Beth Dutton	Recurring role, 7 episodes
2019	Into the Dark	Riley	Episode: "Treehouse"
2020–2021	Home Before Dark	Izzy Lisko	Main role, 20 episodes
