= Lewis Colick =

American screenwriter

Lewis Colick (born January 10, 1951) is an American screenwriter born in Brooklyn, New York. He attended Baruch College in New York and got his MFA in Theatre Arts from the UCLA Film School.

== Filmography ==
=== Film ===
Year	Title	Writer	Producer
1983	The Dirt Bike Kid	Yes	No
1992	Unlawful Entry	Yes	No
1993	Judgment Night	Yes	No
1996	Bulletproof	Yes	No
1996	Ghosts of Mississippi	Yes	No
1999	October Sky	Yes	No
2001	Domestic Disturbance	Yes	No
2004	Beyond the Sea	Yes	No
2004	Ladder 49	Yes	No
2010	Charlie St. Cloud	Yes	No
2023	Flamin' Hot	Yes	No

Uncredited revisions

- Dante's Peak (1997)
- Along Came a Spider (2001)
- Hardball (2001)

=== Television ===
Year	Title	Writer	Notes
1982	Archie Bunker's Place	Yes	Episode "Love Is Hell"
1983	Three's Company	Yes	Episode "Star Struck"
1988	Crossing the Mob	Yes	Television Film
1996	Radiant City	Yes	Television Film
