= Karrie Martin =

American actress

- Born: March 3, 1989 (age 36); Louisiana, U.S.
- Occupation: Actress
- Years active: 2014–present

Karrie Martin (born March 3, 1989) is an American actress and entrepreneur best known for her role as Ana Morales on the Netflix series Gentefied. Martin grew up in a Honduran-American family and did not speak English until she started school. She attended Louisiana State University for college, where she was in Phi Mu sorority. Prior to acting, she worked in casting.

== Filmography ==
Film
Year	Film	Role
2017	Dawning of the Dead	Los Angeles Victim
2019	Roommates (TV Movie)	Karrie

Television
Year	Series	Role	Notes
2015	Pretty Little Liars	Lindsay	Episode: "Fresh Meat"
2015	Freak Out	Karrie	Episode: "Rodents Freak Me Out!"
2017	The Arrangement	Girl #2	Episode: "Pilot"
2018	The Purge	Maria	Episode: "The Urge to Purge"
2020	Gentefied	Ana Morales	Main role
2022	The Proud Family: Louder and Prouder	College Lacienega (Voice)	Episode: “When You Wish Upon a Roker”
