= Roger Enrico =

American businessman

- Born: November 11, 1944; Chisholm, Minnesota, U.S.
- Died: June 1, 2016 (aged 71); Cayman Islands
- Education: Babson College
- Known for: CEO of PepsiCo; Caffeine-Free Pepsi

Roger Anthony Enrico (November 11, 1944 – June 1, 2016) was an American businessman who is best known for his lengthy service as chief executive officer of PepsiCo.

== Early life ==
Enrico was born on November 11, 1944, to Italian immigrants parents Anthony and Rose Marie (Parucci) Enrico in the Mesabi Range mining town of Chisholm, Minnesota. His father worked in the local industrial/iron-ore sector. He was awarded a scholarship to Babson College where he studied business administration. Enrico enlisted in the United States Navy and served in Vietnam.

== Business career ==
Enrico started his business career with General Mills as a brand manager for Wheaties. In 1971, he joined PepsiCo to help market Funyuns. He later served as brand manager for Cheetos and Fritos before heading operations in Japan and South America. He was appointed CEO of the beverage division of PepsiCo in 1983 at the age of 38. That year he signed Michael Jackson to a multimillion-dollar marketing deal. Lionel Richie was later signed. Enrico became CEO of Frito-Lay in 1991, followed by vice chair of PepsiCo in 1994.

Enrico was the Chairman of PepsiCo from 1996 to 2001, and Chairman of DreamWorks Animation SKG Inc from 2004 to 2012. He was well known for his business rivalry with fellow businessman Roberto Goizueta, CEO of Coca-Cola during his tenure as Pepsi's CEO.

He served on the board of directors of the National Geographic Society, the Environmental Defense Fund, the Solar Electric Light Fund, and the American Film Institute.

Enrico later credited his father with shaping his management style—specifically seeking ideas from front-line plant workers after his father noted that bosses rarely listened to his own advice.

== Death ==
Enrico died June 1, 2016, aged 71, while snorkelling in the Cayman Islands, where he had a home.

In 2023, Enrico was portrayed in the film Flamin' Hot by Tony Shalhoub.

== Memoir ==
Enrico, Roger; Kornbluth, Jesse (1986). The Other Guy Blinked: How Pepsi Won the Cola Wars. Bantam. ISBN 9780553051773.
