= Miracles from Heaven (book) =

2015 memoir by Christy Beam

Miracles from Heaven: A Little Girl, Her Journey to Heaven, and Her Amazing Story of Healing
- First edition
- Author: Christy Beam
- Language: English
- Genre: Religious Drama
- Publisher: Hachette Books
- Publication date: April 14, 2015
- Publication place: United States
- Media type: Print (Paperback, hardcover)
- ISBN: 0316381810

Miracles from Heaven: A Little Girl, Her Journey to Heaven, and Her Amazing Story of Healing is a memoir written by an American author Christy Beam, released on April 14, 2015. The author wrote the book about her daughter Annabel Beam.

== Plot ==
The book is about the author's then-10-year-old daughter, Annabel Beam, who was diagnosed with a rare terminal stomach disorder. During a visit home from the hospital, she fell; while climbing a tree with her older sister, a branch gave away, sending Annabel 30 feet headfirst into the hollow trunk of a cottonwood tree. She was inside the trunk of the tree for several hours, where she visited with Jesus, who told her she would be fine. She was finally rescued and taken to a hospital. She woke up at the hospital without any broken bones or internal injuries. After this incident, she no longer felt pain from her stomach disorder, and her doctor confirmed that her rare disease was somehow miraculously cured.

== Film adaptation ==
Sony Pictures Entertainment has produced a film adaptation, starring Jennifer Garner, Kylie Rogers, Queen Latifah, Martin Henderson, and Eugenio Derbez. It is directed by Patricia Riggen and scripted by Randy Brown. The film received mixed to positive reviews, with Garner's performance as Christy earning praise.
