= Ludwig Hurtado =

Filmmaker, writer and journalist

Ludwig Hurtado is an American filmmaker, writer, and multidisciplinary artist. Hurtado currently hosts MOLD Magazine's "Food Futures" podcast, and is an editor at The Nation. Hurtado's writing has been featured in The New York Times, New York Magazine, Bon Appétit, The Atlantic’s City Lab, Vice, Pitchfork, Rolling Stone, i_D, Them, The Face, and various other outlets.

== Work ==
Ludwig is a noted filmmaker and journalist, specializing in documentary storytelling. At NBC News, he served as a producer, where he created and directed a range of documentary shorts and video pieces featured across NBC's various platforms. His work included producing award-winning segments for the network's prominent newsmagazine, Dateline, and NBC's streaming service, NBC News NOW. He also appeared as an on-camera correspondent for NBC Latino, NBC Out, and NBC LX.

His achievements have earned him multiple awards, including the prestigious Edward R. Murrow Award, a GLAAD Media Award, and a Webby Award. He is an active member of several professional organizations, including the National Association for Hispanic Journalists, the Queer Producers Network, and the Video Consortium.

In 2021, the filmmaker and writer was selected as one of 17 emerging filmmakers for DOC NYC’s Storytelling Incubator, a program designed to support up-and-coming documentarians.

Beyond filmmaking, Ludwig has shared his expertise by delivering talks at various academic institutions such as Columbia University, UCLA, Bard College, and The City University of New York.
