= The Unit season 3 =

The Unit
- Season 3
- DVD cover
- No. of episodes: 11

Release
- Original network: CBS
- Original release: September 25 – December 18, 2007

Season chronology
- ← Previous; Season 2 Next → Season 4

The third season of The Unit started on September 25, 2007, with a hiatus, which ended in the season being cut short, occurring after the 11th episode due to the 2007–08 Writers Guild of America strike.

== Cast and characters ==
=== Main cast ===
- Dennis Haysbert as Sergeant Major Jonas Blane, a.k.a. Snake Doctor
- Scott Foley as Staff Sergeant (Note: In the season finale, Side Angle Side, Brown is promoted to sergeant first class) Bob Brown, a.k.a. Cool Breeze
- Max Martini as Master Sergeant Mack Gerhardt, a.k.a. Dirt Diver
- Michael Irby as Sergeant First Class Charles Grey, a.k.a. Betty Blue
- Robert Patrick as Colonel Thomas Ryan, a.k.a. Dog Patch
- Demore Barnes as Sergeant First Class Hector Williams, a.k.a. Hammerhead (Note: In episode 7, Five Brothers, Williams dies.)

=== Supporting cast ===
- Regina Taylor as Molly Blane
- Audrey Marie Anderson as Kim Brown
- Abby Brammell as Tiffy Gerhardt
- Rebecca Pidgeon as Charlotte Ryan
- Kavita Patil as Sergeant Kayla Medawar

=== Recurring cast ===
- Susan Matus as Sergeant Sarah Irvine
- Angel Wainwright as Betsy Blane
- Alyssa Shafer as Serena Brown

== Episodes ==
No. overall	No. in season	Title	Directed by	Written by	Original release date	Prod. code	US viewers (millions)	Rank (week)
37	1	"Pandemonium (Part 1)"	Vahan Moosekian	Sharon Lee Watson	September 25, 2007	3ALF01	10.70	30
Jonas is pursued by a mysterious assassin, and meets up with Mariana, a CIA operative from the 2nd season. Colonel Ryan meets up with his wife, who has sold out secrets about the unit that prompted the investigation and subsequent shutdown of the unit. Finally, Jonas makes a shocking discovery.
38	2	"Pandemonium (Part 2)"	Steven DePaul	Todd Ellis Kessler	October 2, 2007	3ALF02	11.31	24
Jonas, Bob, and Charles return to Washington, D.C., and rendezvous with Colonel Ryan. They try to find the person responsible for the dismantling of the Unit and try to clear their name. Meanwhile Hector is being transported to a Senate subcommittee hearing to testify against the Unit and Mack is held at a secret prison.
39	3	"Always Kiss Them Goodbye"	Michael Zinberg	Eric L. Haney	October 9, 2007	3ALF03	11.03	24
A VX nerve agent bomb has been stolen from a nearby military arsenal. While Mack mans the TOC, Jonas leads the other Team members on an attempt to recover the stolen bomb. When the bomb is loaded on a plane, Bob pursues it on another plane. On base, an accident between Mack and Tiffy in the garage is misinterpreted as a domestic dispute and Ryan orders Mack to move to the BEQ. Kim tries to start a military talk show at the radio station.
40	4	"Every Step You Take"	Helen Shaver	Lynn Mamet	October 16, 2007	3ALF04	12.35	22
Bob, Mack, and Hector rescue embassy personnel and their families who are under attack in Abidjan. After learning that his daughter wants to enlist, Jonas takes her on a trip to prepare her for boot camp.
41	5	"Inside Out"	Bill L. Norton	Dan Hindmarch	October 23, 2007	3ALF05	10.84	27
The Unit must retrieve a computer chip being carried by a mule that contains information on undercover agents within terrorist networks. On base, Bob tries to care for his family after Kim needs bed rest due to her pregnancy. To make ends meet after getting fired from her teaching job, Tiffy goes to work at a bar, first as a waitress and then as an exotic dancer.
42	6	"MPs"	James Whitmore, Jr.	David Mamet	October 30, 2007	3ALF06	10.72	N/A
Jonas, Mack and Grey protect a troublesome pop star during her trip to Iraq. Bob is tasked to escort a foreign prisoner for extradition to his home country. Williams dates a waitress where Tiffy works.
43	7	"Five Brothers"	Steve Gomer	Frank Military	November 6, 2007	3ALF07	11.08	27
On a mission in Beirut to rescue a kidnapped reporter who endangers the team, Grey is shot. The wives insist on helping a reluctant Tiffy against an unscrupulous tow truck operator. Williams is killed by a sniper during the mission.
44	8	"Play 16"	James Whitmore, Jr.	Daniel Voll	November 13, 2007	3ALF08	11.04	27
Jonas goes on a solo mission to seek out the leader of the group responsible for Williams' death. Bob lobbies the rescued journalist to keep the mission a secret.
45	9	"Binary Explosion"	Steven DePaul	Randy Huggins	November 20, 2007	3ALF09	10.76	28
Jonas, Grey, and Bob work to uncover gang members in the Army who are selling weapons. Meanwhile, Mack and Col. Ryan track down football players who caused Tiffy to get into an auto accident.
46	10	"Gone Missing"	Terrence O'Hara	Eric L. Haney & Lynn Mamet	November 27, 2007	3ALF10	10.56	28
In Macedonia, Bob's operation capability becomes questionable after he starts to see visions of people whom he killed during missions. Tiffy and Kim discover a shocking story about Molly's father.
47	11	"Side Angle Side" (Note: The title "Side Angle Side", commonly abbreviated in mathematics as SAS, refers to the British Special Air Service, also abbreviated SAS.)	Seth Wiley	Todd Ellis Kessler	December 18, 2007	3ALF11	10.74	10
Jonas is in London working on discovering the connection between a Russian uranium dealer and his old friend from MI5. On the home front, Kim is confronted by a suicidal caller on her talk show, Bob gets a promotion to Sergeant First Class, and Charles is having an internal struggle about dating his late-friend-and-teammate Hector Williams' ex-girlfriend.
