= The Unit season 2 =

The Unit
- Season 2
- DVD cover
- No. of episodes: 23

Release
- Original network: CBS
- Original release: September 19, 2006 – May 8, 2007

Season chronology
- ← Previous; Season 1 Next → Season 3

The second season of The Unit originally aired between September 19, 2006 and May 8, 2007; it introduces several new characters to the series. Tiffy has trouble with the law when she covers for Colonel Ryan's wife, Charlotte, and The Unit is investigated by the CIA over infractions that could result in criminal charges.

== Cast and characters ==
=== Main cast ===
- Dennis Haysbert as Sergeant Major Jonas Blane, aka Snake Doctor
- Scott Foley as Staff Sergeant Bob Brown, aka Cool Breeze
- Max Martini as Master Sergeant Mack Gerhardt, aka Dirt Diver
- Michael Irby as Sergeant First Class Charles Grey, aka Betty Blue
- Robert Patrick as Colonel Thomas Ryan, aka Dog Patch
- Demore Barnes as Sergeant First Class Hector Williams, aka Hammerhead

=== Supporting cast ===
- Regina Taylor as Molly Blane
- Audrey Marie Anderson as Kim Brown
- Abby Brammell as Tiffy Gerhardt
- Rebecca Pidgeon as Charlotte Ryan
- Kavita Patil as Sergeant Kayla Medawar

=== Recurring cast ===
- Susan Matus as Sergeant Sarah Irvine
- Angel Wainwright as Betsy Blane
- Summer Glau as Crystal Burns
- Daniel Wisler as Jeremy Erhart
- Alyssa Shafer as Serena Brown
- Jon Hamm as Wilson James
- Lindsay Frost as US Senator Elizabeth Webb
- Ricky Jay as CIA Agent Kern
- Conor O'Farrell as General Heath

== Episodes ==
No. overall	No. in season	Title	Directed by	Written by	Original release date	Prod. code	US viewers (millions)	Rank (week)
14	1	"Change of Station"	Steven DePaul	David Mamet	September 19, 2006	2ALF01	11.81	28
Mack and Tiffy prepare to leave the Unit, but she begins to feel conflicted when one of her former students, who claims to be physically abused, comes to her for help. The rest of the team are sent to Pakistan to prevent a plan to spread a deadly disease throughout the western world.
15	2	"Extreme Rendition"	Terrence O'Hara	Sharon Lee Watson	September 26, 2006	2ALF03	11.96	27
The team must help a rogue former Unit operator escape from a Bulgarian prison in order to have him help assassinate the world's leading arms dealer. On base, Molly takes a one time recruiting job to hire someone away from the Unit so she can put her sick mother in a nursing home.
16	3	"The Kill Zone"	Steve Gomer	Lynn Mamet	October 3, 2006	2ALF02	13.22	23
The team is sent to Paraguay to eliminate a militia rebel leader, but the mission is put on hold when they must rescue two operators trapped by a sniper. On base, the wives help the fiancée of a deceased Unit member gain custody of her two would be step-daughters.
17	4	"Manhunt"	Michael Zinberg	Emily Halpern	October 10, 2006	2ALF04	13.03	23
The team must find a terrorist who is planning to attack a nuclear waste train. On base, Kim becomes upset when she sees a strange man talking to her daughter, Serena, outside of school.
18	5	"Force Majeure"	James Whitmore, Jr.	Daniel Voll	October 17, 2006	2ALF05	12.94	25
The team must evacuate an exiled dictator from an American hospital during a hurricane, but discover that other patients have been left behind. On base, Molly struggles over whether to honor Jeremy's request to be sent to Iraq and Tiffy and Mack decide to have another baby.
19	6	"Old Home Week"	David Mamet	David Mamet	October 31, 2006	2ALF07	11.49	30
The team is sent to Africa on a mission to track down smuggled diamonds. On base, the wives organize "Old Home Week" to raise funds to help those in service in Iraq. Kim discovers an undelivered letter written by a soldier to someone he deeply loved, shortly before he was killed in action in 1944. She attempts to find the soldier's widow through his friend-in-arms and deliver the letter to her.
20	7	"Off the Meter"	Alex Zakrzewski	Lynn Mamet & Eric L. Haney	November 7, 2006	2ALF08	11.34	35
Jonas enlists Bob to take part in an unofficial operation to extract Ron Cheals' illegitimate daughter from a religious cult whose members are about to flee the U.S. On base, Tiffy covers for Charlotte Ryan when she is questioned by the police after she sees her driving erratically and discovers pills in her car.
21	8	"Natural Selection"	Helen Shaver	Sharon Lee Watson	November 14, 2006	2ALF09	11.84	30
Bob and his translator are stranded in the Russian wilderness after their helicopter crashes. As Bob fights to save his translator's life, he remembers his experience during Unit selection through a series of flashbacks.
22	9	"Report by Exception"	Gwyneth Horder-Payton	Todd Ellis Kessler	November 21, 2006 (Note: "Report by Exception" was originally to be aired on October 24, 2006, but was preempted.)	2ALF06	12.39	22
The team are sent to assassinate a prominent Latin American official who threatens the U.S. oil supply, but the mission is made difficult for Jonas when the woman posing as his wife begins to take her role very seriously. Colonel Tom Ryan travels to Washington, D.C. and is questioned about the Unit's mission during a congressional briefing.
23	10	"Bait"	Jean de Segonzac	Randy Huggins	November 28, 2006	2ALF10	12.56	23
Colonel Ryan is shut down by his contacts in Washington when Jonas becomes a prisoner of war in Georgia. Since his contacts refuse to cooperate with him, Colonel Ryan sends the team to rescue Jonas. On base, Tiffy learns she may face time in prison for her involvement in covering up Charlotte's reckless driving.
24	11	"Silver Star"	Bill L. Norton	David Mamet	December 12, 2006	2ALF14	13.74	N/A
Jonas' father is awarded the Silver Star for his actions in Korea. Jonas recalls his father's actions to his nephew, also a soldier, after he learns that his nephew beats his young wife. In the TOC at the base, Mack and Bob must help land a plane that has flown into a restricted area.
25	12	"The Broom Cupboard"	Karen Gaviola	Emily Halpern	January 16, 2007	2ALF11	11.93	19
The team is assigned to protect a U.S. Senator who plans to meet a rebel leader wanting to overthrow his government. Jonas receives a top secret mission from the President of the United States to evaluate the rebel leader. Molly, Tiffy, and Kim help Jeremy with a surprise engagement party for Crystal.
26	13	"Sub Conscious"	Steven DePaul	Daniel Voll	February 6, 2007	2ALF13	12.41	25
Kim is overheard discussing a dream she had which inexplicably contains secret details of the team's dangerous mission to North Korea. Colonel Ryan learns of the dream and believes Bob told Kim about the plan. Meanwhile, Jonas has to deal with the captain of a South Korean submarine.
27	14	"Johnny B. Good"	Vahan Moosekian	Todd Ellis Kessler	February 6, 2007	2ALF12	10.54	32
The team is sent into Iran to deploy sensors for detecting nuclear weapons, but the mission becomes complicated when civilians become involved. On base, Tiffy considers whether she should help a soldier who went AWOL and Molly visits Jeremy in the burn unit. She becomes disappointed when Crystal does not come to visit him.
28	15	"The Water is Wide"	Krishna Rao	Lynn Mamet	February 13, 2007	2ALF15	11.86	26
The team is sent on a mission to protect a Middle Eastern dignitary at the United Nations, but must defuse a bomb found in the office of the U.N. Secretary General. Meanwhile, Molly and Tiffy visit Vietnam to honor the soldiers who fought there. On base, Crystal tries to seduce Mack and threatens to tell Tiffy about their relationship.
29	16	"Games of Chance"	Terrence O'Hara	Sharon Lee Watson	February 20, 2007	2ALF16	11.70	23
The team competes against other elite military forces from around the world in counter-terrorism games staged in Hamburg, Germany, but the games turn deadly when someone tries to use them to stage a real act of terrorism. Meanwhile, Kim meets a former boyfriend while on a business trip and learns that he is now a multimillionaire and recently divorced.
30	17	"Dark of the Moon"	Michael Zinberg	Eric L. Haney	February 27, 2007	2ALF17	13.05	21
The team captures three Pakistani men from a Waziristan village to take in for questioning, but they are pursued by the local militia. After arriving at an Army support base in a remote area of Afghanistan, the team find the base in a state of disarray and must prepare the troops against an attack from the militia.
31	18	"Two Coins"	Bill L. Norton	David Mamet	March 20, 2007	2ALF18	11.97	17
Grey becomes involved in a relationship with a female Israeli soldier when the team travels to Israel to study advanced desert warfare. When the two go off into the desert alone, they become surrounded by hostile Arab militia. On base, Tiffy stumbles upon a windfall which makes her question her motives.
32	19	"Outsiders"	Alex Zakrzewski	Randy Huggins	April 3, 2007	2ALF19	9.83	33
Brown and Williams are sent to Papua New Guinea to retrieve an aircraft's black box. Back on base, Mack discovers that Crystal may be talking to a reporter about the Unit.
33	20	"In Loco Parentis"	Michael Offer	Clayton Surratt & Todd Ellis Kessler	April 10, 2007	2ALF20	10.37	24
The team must work with a SWAT unit to rescue the students of an elite international private school in the Washington suburbs who have been taken hostage by unknown captors. On base, Lissy becomes interested in the son of an Officer.
34	21	"Bedfellows"	Dean White	Emily Halpern	April 24, 2007	2ALF21	9.83	27
Bob's loyalty to Jonas and the Unit is challenged when he is recruited to work with the CIA on a covert mission. On base, Mack becomes convinced that Tiffy is having an affair.
35	22	"Freefall"	James Whitmore, Jr.	Daniel Voll & Sara B. Cooper	May 1, 2007	2ALF22	9.70	32
Mack, Grey and Williams protect a Thai prince on American soil and uncover scandalous family secrets that include murder. Meanwhile, Bob's life is endangered when a parachute jump goes awry.
36	23	"Paradise Lost"	Vahan Moosekian	Eric L. Haney & Lynn Mamet	May 8, 2007	2ALF23	10.74	24
The team is investigated by a government agency that is probing into possible infractions that could result in criminal charges. Mack confronts Tiffy about Wilson and the CIA continues to try and recruit Bob.
