= The Unit season 1 =

The Unit
- Season 1
- DVD cover
- No. of episodes: 13

Release
- Original network: CBS
- Original release: March 7 – May 16, 2006

Season chronology
- Next → Season 2

The first season of The Unit originally aired between March 7, 2006, and May 16, 2006, it introduces the members of The Unit and their families. As the season progresses various plots and story arcs are explored, such as Tiffy Gerhardt's affair with Colonel Tom Ryan and Molly Blane's mission to find the army widow who conned her out of her savings. In the United States, the first season of The Unit averaged 15.5 million viewers and was the fourteenth most watched show during the 2005–2006 television season.

== Cast and characters ==
=== Main cast ===
- Dennis Haysbert as Sergeant Major Jonas Blane, a.k.a. Snake Doctor
- Regina Taylor as Molly Blane, Jonas Blane's wife
- Robert Patrick as Colonel Thomas Ryan, a.k.a. Dog Patch
- Audrey Marie Anderson as Kim Brown
- Max Martini as Master Sergeant Mack Gerhardt, a.k.a. Dirt Diver
- Abby Brammell as Tiffy Gerhardt
- Michael Irby as Sergeant First Class Charles Grey, a.k.a. Betty Blue
- Demore Barnes as Sergeant First Class Hector Williams, a.k.a. Hammerhead
- Scott Foley as Staff Sergeant Bob Brown, a.k.a. Cool Breeze

=== Recurring cast ===
- Alyssa Shafer as Serena Brown
- Michael O'Neill as Ron Cheals
- Christina Gianaris as Mandy
- Danielle Hanratty as Lissy Gerhardt
- Kavita Patil as Sergeant Kayla Medawar
- Sammi Hanratty as Jenny Gerhardt
- Gale Morgan Harold III as Rory
- Karl Makinen as Coots
- Mary B. McCann as Ruth Cheals

== Episodes ==
No. overall	No. in season	Title	Directed by	Written by	Original release date	Prod. code	US viewers (millions)	Rank (week)
1	1	"First Responders"	Davis Guggenheim	David Mamet	March 7, 2006	1ALF79	18.50	10
The Unit's newest member, Bob Brown, quickly learns the ropes from the team after terrorists hijack a business jet in Idaho. On base, Bob's wife adjusts to the shock of learning that her husband is part of the team trying to rescue the airline hostages.
2	2	"Stress"	Guy Ferland	David Mamet	March 14, 2006	1ALF01	18.07	5
The team, except for Bob, is deployed to Africa to retrieve a radiological component of a crashed Chinese satellite. On base, Bob must deal with his family, who are still settling in, and interrogation from an FBI agent. Meanwhile, the wives comfort the wife of a soldier who was killed in action.
3	3	"200th Hour"	Steve Gomer	Sharon Lee Watson & Carol Flint	March 21, 2006	1ALF04	15.50	10
Jonas is sent to rescue a group of missionaries in Indonesia, while Bob must prove to the team that he is up to the job, after making a mistake in training. On base, the wives prepare to host a visiting senator who holds the power to increase financing for the Unit's military training.
4	4	"True Believers"	Oz Scott	Shawn Ryan & Eric L. Haney	March 28, 2006	1ALF02	16.08	13
The team is sent to Los Angeles to protect Mexico's Drug Minister who has been threatened with assassination. The team is able to prevent an attempt the minister's life, but his wife and two young sons are kidnapped. On base, a former Unit wife returns to recruit their husbands into the private sector.
5	5	"Non-Permissive Environment"	Ron Lagomarsino	Lynn Mamet & Paul Redford	April 4, 2006	1ALF03	15.44	10
The team is forced to escape Spain when their mission to assassinate a terrorist is called off by the government. On base, Molly learns that her daughter, Betsy, wants to drop out of college. Kim considers signing up for courses at the local college.
6	6	"Security"	David Mamet	David Mamet	April 11, 2006	1ALF06	14.12	12
The team is sent to Beirut to prevent the Russians from selling nuclear information to the Iranians. On base, Colonel Tom Ryan tries to end his affair with Tiffy, but she will not listen. Kim begins to ask Molly questions after she sees Tiffy enter a motel room.
7	7	"Dedication"	Helen Shaver	Paul Redford & Sharon Lee Watson	April 18, 2006	1ALF07	15.62	10
While on a mission in Afghanistan to assassinate a high-ranking member of the Taliban, the team attempts to rescue other Unit members when their helicopter experiences engine problems. On base, Molly confronts Ron Cheals about his addiction to painkillers and Kim tries to land a job at a radio station.
8	8	"SERE"	Steven DePaul	Lynn Mamet & Carol Flint	April 25, 2006	1ALF08	13.87	18
The team participates in a SERE (Survival, Evasion, Resistance, Escape) training drill in which they are treated as prisoners of war. The drill pushes them to their mental and physical limits when the doctor who runs SERE places their lives in danger. On base, Kim struggles with her faith in God, while Molly tries to help her find it again.
9	9	"Eating the Young"	J. Miller Tobin	Sterling Anderson	May 2, 2006	1ALF05	14.06	18
The team must recover seven Stinger missiles from a Brazilian arms merchant, who uses children as guards, before he sells them to Islamic militants. On base, Kim causes trouble when she tries to bring about change in the family-readiness group and Hector's girlfriend discovers what his real job is in the Army.
10	10	"Unannounced"	Bill L. Norton	Paul Redford & Emily Halpern	May 9, 2006	1ALF09	14.18	18
Bob's cover is compromised while guarding the U.S. Secretary of State in Africa. On base, Molly is conned when she agrees to purchase a home from an army widow and Kim receives an unwelcome visit at the radio station from an admirer she spoke to on the phone.
11	11	"Exposure"	Guy Norman Bee	Sharon Lee Watson & Dan Hindmarch	May 9, 2006	1ALF10	12.33	26
During the Unit's annual "Day of the Dead" celebration, Jonas must deal with a young man who wants to know the truth about his father's (Mark Pellegrino) death. Meanwhile, Molly tracks down the woman who conned her and Bob is faced with a dilemma when a Unit widow insists that he sleep with her.
12	12	"Morale, Welfare and Recreation"	Félix Enríquez Alcalá	Sterling Anderson & Paul Redford	May 16, 2006	1ALF11	14.04	14
The team is sent to Atlanta to defuse a bomb. Kim discovers that her vacation with Bob to Cancún, Mexico is actually cover for a mission. Bob asks for her help to catch a spy who is selling top-secret files to the Chinese government.
13	13	"The Wall"	David Mamet	Eric L. Haney & Lynn Mamet	May 16, 2006	1ALF12	13.08	22
The team is sent to assist French-led United Nations peace keeping forces in capturing a former Yugoslavian general for war crimes. On base, Jonas learns that Molly has lost their savings and Tiffy considers divorcing Mack after she reads a letter indicating that he has re-enlisted.
