= The Unit season 4 =

The Unit
- Season 4
- DVD cover
- No. of episodes: 22

Release
- Original network: CBS
- Original release: September 28, 2008 – May 10, 2009

Season chronology
- ← Previous; Season 3

The fourth and final season of The Unit started on September 28, 2008, and concluded on May 10, 2009. The season included 22 episodes and introduced Bridget Sullivan (Nicole Steinwedell) and Sam McBride (Wes Chatham), new members to the unit and the team.

A fifth season was planned as the show's last. However, on May 19, 2009, a week after the season finale, CBS declined to renew the series along with Without a Trace.

For the 2008-09 U.S. television season, the fourth season of The Unit ranked #43 with an average of 10 million viewers.

== Cast and characters ==
=== Main cast ===
- Dennis Haysbert as Sergeant Major Jonas Blane, a.k.a. Snake Doctor
- Scott Foley as Sergeant First Class Bob Brown, a.k.a. Cool Breeze
- Max Martini as Master Sergeant Mack Gerhardt, a.k.a. Dirt Diver
- Michael Irby as Sergeant First Class Charles Grey, a.k.a. Betty Blue
- Robert Patrick as Colonel (Note: In the season finale, Unknown Soldier, Ryan is promoted to brigadier general) Thomas Ryan, a.k.a. Dog Patch
- Nicole Steinwedell as Warrant Officer One Bridget Sullivan, a.k.a. Red Cap

=== Supporting cast ===
- Wes Chatham as Staff Sergeant Sam McBride, a.k.a. Whiplash
- Regina Taylor as Molly Blane
- Audrey Marie Anderson as Kim Brown
- Abby Brammell as Tiffy Gerhardt
- Bre Blair as Joss Grey
- Rebecca Pidgeon as Charlotte Ryan
- Kavita Patil as Sergeant Kayla Medawar

=== Recurring cast ===
- Susan Matus as Sergeant Sarah Irvine
- Angel Wainwright as Second Lieutenant Betsy Blane
- Alyssa Shafer as Serena Brown

== Episodes ==
| No. overall | No. in season | Title | Directed by | Written by | Original release date | Prod. code | US viewers (millions) | Rank (week) |
|---|---|---|---|---|---|---|---|---|
| 48 | 1 | "Sacrifice" | David Mamet | Frank Military | September 28, 2008 | 4ALF01 | 9.71 | 29 |
After completing a five-month-long assignment, the team is called upon to stop an assassination plot targeting the president-elect and vice president-elect. The situation raises suspicion among high-level government officials. Back at the base, the Unit wives are relocated for their own safety due to the sensitive nature of their husbands' mission.
| 49 | 2 | "Sudden Flight" | Steven DePaul | Sharon Lee Watson | October 5, 2008 | 4ALF02 | 9.46 | 26 |
The team is tailing an important scientist en route from Argentina to South Africa on a commercial flight, when unidentified hijackers take over. Meanwhile, Kim and Bob's baby is ill, while the spouses continue their adjustment to their new lives.
| 50 | 3 | "Sex Trade" | Jesús Salvador Treviño | Todd Ellis Kessler | October 12, 2008 | 4ALF03 | 9.10 | 29 |
While the team is in Kosovo negotiating the purchase of weapons-grade plutonium, Jonas discovers aspiring models forced into prostitution. At home, Kim starts her cover job as an in-home nanny and Tiffy as a teacher at the local school.
| 51 | 4 | "The Conduit" | Michael Zinberg | David Mamet | October 19, 2008 | 4ALF04 | 8.28 | 36 |
Bob is held hostage by a drug cartel after he poses as a chemist who can turn cocaine into paint for easy smuggling. Meanwhile, Mack penetrates the group posing as a prize fighter in an illegal betting ring to help bring them down.
| 52 | 5 | "Dancing Lessons" | Steve Gomer | Lynn Mamet & Ted Humphrey | October 26, 2008 | 4ALF05 | 9.17 | 36 |
A nuclear scientist insists on making a deal with the team before revealing information about an imminent terrorist attack on a major U.S. city; Kim, Molly and Tiffy are asked to work undercover with Jonas.
| 53 | 6 | "Inquisition" | David Paymer | Patrick Moss & Shannon Rutherford | November 2, 2008 | 4ALF06 | 8.98 | 40 |
Hoping to con a terrorist into exposing his accomplices before they escape, the team produces phony evidence of an attack.
| 54 | 7 | "Into Hell (Part 1)" | Krishna Rao | Daniel Voll | November 9, 2008 | 4ALF07 | 9.87 | 27 |
Jonas' daughter, Betsy, is kidnapped in Iraq, and Jonas and the team go in to rescue her. When they arrive, they learn she has been taken into Syria and that crossing the border is forbidden by the U.S. military because to do so is an act of war. Col. Ryan joins the mission and Mack plots his revenge against him for having an affair with Tiffy.
| 55 | 8 | "Into Hell (Part 2)" | Fred Gerber | Frank Military | November 16, 2008 | 4ALF08 | 10.23 | 27 |
Jonas and the team attempt to rescue Jonas' daughter, Betsy, from her Syrian kidnappers, who now also hold Col. Ryan. Back at home, Molly is summoned to Washington, D.C., to meet with a government psychologist (Linda Hunt), who believes Molly can help her daughter through the power of thought.
| 56 | 9 | "Shadow Riders" | Vahan Moosekian | Sharon Lee Watson | November 23, 2008 | 4ALF09 | 9.99 | 30 |
Jonas and his team attempt to keep a truce intact between two warring Afghanistan tribes by delivering a bride to her groom, but it requires going through enemy territory. Back at home, Bob and Kim try to expose a man who may be linked to terrorists.
| 57 | 10 | "Misled and Misguided" | Steven DePaul | Todd Ellis Kessler | November 30, 2008 | 4ALF10 | 9.56 | 15 |
When the team is ordered to raid an anthrax lab in Uzbekistan, they find themselves fighting against their ally, a political official who thinks that high-tech gadgetry is better than field logic. On the home front, Kim finds herself in a life-threatening situation when her boss tells her to help him cover up a murder.
| 58 | 11 | "Switchblade" | Oz Scott | David Mamet | December 21, 2008 | 4ALF11 | 8.24 | 19 |
Jonas and the team force an arrogant Department of Defense official, who jeopardized a previous mission due to his lack of field experience, into joining them on an assignment so he will observe war up close and personal. Back at home, Kim is secretly reunited with her kids.
| 59 | 12 | "Bad Beat" | Bill L. Norton | Ted Humphrey | January 4, 2009 | 4ALF12 | 9.73 | 9 |
A CIA agent, who's gone over to the other side, plays a game of Baccarat with Jonas; if Jonas wins, the man will help out on their current mission. The team is working with the CIA and their success may have implications for one of their own who is in trouble.
| 60 | 13 | "The Spear of Destiny" | Scott Foley | Lynn Mamet & Benjamin Daniel Lobato | January 11, 2009 | 4ALF13 | 10.16 | 24 |
Mack gets badly wounded while on a mission with Jonas and they must seek refuge in a monastery. On the home front, Bob is assigned to a mission which gives Kim a glimpse into the darker side of his job.
| 61 | 14 | "The Last Nazi" | Michael Offer | David Mamet | February 15, 2009 | 4ALF14 | 8.36 | 18 |
The President orders the team to capture a Nazi war criminal and bring him to The Hague in the Netherlands. In D.C., Colonel Ryan confronts his past when he is offered a promotion to brigadier general.
| 62 | 15 | "Hero" | Terrence O'Hara | R. Scott Gemmill & Randy Huggins | March 8, 2009 | 4ALF15 | 9.38 | 33 |
The unit initiates a new team member while Jonas coaches his daughter, Betsy, on how to respond to media questions about her kidnapping and rescue without blowing the cover story.
| 63 | 16 | "Hill 60" | James Whitmore, Jr. | Ted Humphrey | March 15, 2009 | 4ALF16 | 10.87 | 21 |
When a deadly gas is released into the air, the men and their families are trapped in their homes. Without access to the outside world, they must find a way to survive this attack.
| 64 | 17 | "Flesh & Blood" | Dennis Haysbert | Lynn Mamet & Pete Blaber | March 22, 2009 | 4ALF17 | 8.14 | 35 |
The Unit is sent in to rescue an old friend and finds themselves in trouble. On the home front, Tom finds a lead in a terrorist attack and implements some extreme measures to get the information from a suspect.
| 65 | 18 | "Best Laid Plans" | Dean White | Benjamin Daniel Lobato & Patrick Moss | March 29, 2009 | 4ALF18 | 9.46 | 14 |
Things go wrong when Jonas and Mack go undercover in an attempt to find the terrorists who killed the vice president.
| 66 | 19 | "Whiplash" | Seth Wiley | Dan Hindmarch | April 12, 2009 | 4ALF19 | 9.05 | 28 |
One of the Unit members attacks their own and the team must deal with them.
| 67 | 20 | "Chaos Theory" | Gwyneth Horder-Payton | Sharon Lee Watson | April 26, 2009 | 4ALF20 | 8.84 | 14 |
A well-thought-out and planned mission is affected by a random event, leaving Jonas and Bob to plan a new mission.
| 68 | 21 | "End Game" | Lesli Linka Glatter | Ted Humphrey | May 3, 2009 | 4ALF21 | 9.97 | 15 |
Molly is kidnapped and used as bait, while Jonas is looking into a possible Russian terrorist cell.
| 69 | 22 | "Unknown Soldier" | Vahan Moosekian | Todd Ellis Kessler | May 10, 2009 | 4ALF22 | 9.64 | 14 |
The Unit must locate and defuse three sets of dirty bombs headed for unknown locations across the United States. Meanwhile, the team prepares for the wedding of one couple and the end of a marriage for another.
