= Ian Fried =

Ian Fried may refer to:

- Ian Fried (screenwriter), American screenwriter
- Ina Fried, formerly Ian Fried, American journalist and former child actor
