= List of The Unit characters =

This is a list of characters from American television series The Unit.

== Main characters ==
=== Jonas Blane ===
Sergeant Major Jonas Blane
- First appearance: First Responders
- Last appearance: Unknown Soldier
- Portrayed by: Dennis Haysbert

In-universe information
- Aliases: Top, Snake Doc(tor)
- Occupation: U.S. Army Special Forces
- Family: George Blane
- Spouse: Molly Blane
- Children: Betsy Blane

Sergeant Major Jonas Blane (United States Army, call sign: Snake Doctor) is the protagonist in the series. He is portrayed by Dennis Haysbert. He is presumed to be in his 40s and has a daughter, Betsy, and a wife named Molly Blane.

Blane is a former Ranger and Green Beret, leading Alpha Team of the 1st Special Actions Group (official cover as the "303rd Logistical Studies Group"). He and his wife, Molly, have one daughter. He is competent in Spanish, French, German, Portuguese, Arabic, and Persian.

Jonas is Alpha Team's Non-Commissioned Officer in Charge. He is frequently referred to as Top by his team, and many members of his team try to do what he would do in any given situation.

During the series pilot of The Unit, Blane takes down a private jet with five terrorists on board, incurring the wrath of the FBI for violating the Posse Comitatus Act. However, Blane and his team are let off the hook. At the end of the first episode, when a mechanical speaking toy repeats an Arabic phrase, he pivots around and fires two rounds from his pistol into a bedroom mirror, a reaction presumably caused by stress. When the incident is uncovered, his wife states that she fired the rounds in an attempt to eliminate a rat.

In other episodes, Blane and his team recover a radioactive component of a Chinese satellite, rescue American missionaries in Indonesia, rescue the drug minister of Mexico, assassinate a terrorist financier in Spain, bug an Iranian official's car at their embassy in Beirut, recover seven Stinger missiles from Brazilian arms dealers, and the apprehend a Serbian war criminal in the Balkans.

Blane's wife, Molly, becomes the victim of con artists and loses the money of several other Army wives. She recovers some of the money and pays back the victims. She is unable to recover her own money though, and this causes tension between herself and Jonas. Molly urges Jonas to join a private military company in order to help their financial situation, but he states that he is not interested in a job as a mercenary.

While in the Balkans, the war criminal that Blane's team apprehends gets a good look at Blane. When the criminal escapes from UN custody, he tracks Blane back to Fort Griffith, the 303rd's headquarters. When Alpha Team leaves post to celebrate the marriage of unit commander Colonel Tom Ryan, the war criminal kills a few workers and injures Mrs. Ryan and Blane.

A few months later (during the second season), after being assigned to active duty once again, while in Pakistan, Blane and his team prevent the spread of weaponized smallpox by members of al-Qaeda. His team is also responsible for the downfall of the world's foremost illegal weapons dealer.

In the Season 4 episode "Sex Trade", in the midst of an operation to recover weapons-grade plutonium and a Russian arms dealer in Kosovo, Jonas encounters a prostitute named Dava to whom he promises to deliver from her owner if she will aid him and the team in gathering intel on Petrov the arms dealer. After one unsuccessful attempt to conduct the transaction, they are given another opportunity which results in the teams procurement of the plutonium and the elimination of Petrov, but the prostitute was offered to Petrov in order to complete the transaction and she was taken over the Kosovo border before Jonas could intercept her. This leaves him with a heavy conscience after failing to keep his end of the bargain.

At the end of season 2, Blane was targeted by the Central Intelligence Agency due to unnamed crimes that he may have committed. These are mentioned to Bob Brown by a CIA handler who wishes to recruit Brown to the Agency. After returning from a mission in Cyprus, Blane and his team find that the United States Army Criminal Investigation Division is investigating Alpha Team, and has shut down the 303rd completely. After finding that the CIA is behind the investigation, Blane fakes his abduction and disappears to Panama City. His official duty status is "Missing" though in reality he is AWOL.

The Season 3 premiere had him changing his appearance by shaving his head and growing a goatee (similar to Dennis Haysbert's famous character in the Major League series, Pedro Cerrano). Blane was found out by Brown who had him in sight through the scope of a sniper rifle. Brown was then surprised by a gun to his head by Charles Grey, who himself had gone AWOL upon the Unit being shut down. Grey brought Brown to Blane's boat where Brown insisted he was not trying to kill Blane, despite being caught by Grey in the compromising position he was in. Blane tests Brown by asking him to put a spoonful of rice cereal into his mouth and spit it out if he was not trying to kill him. Brown did this successfully and Jonas believed him, citing that when humans lie, saliva is not produced in enough quantity to spit out rice.

Blane, through his networked contacts, learned about how the Oil Minister of Venezuela was assassinated. Earlier in Season 2, Blane was ordered to kill the oil minister until Colonel Ryan had a change of heart after talking to a Congressman of another political party, and realizing it was a conspiracy by the big oil lobby to get rid of an actor in the oil market they could not control. Blane and his local CIA contact (whom he actually slept with to preserve his cover) were eventually found out and Blane barely got out of there alive. It was this contact that Blane sought to find out to figure out what happened to the oil minister, whom a Congressional review panel believed was killed by Blane after watching some doctored security footage.

Shortly after Blane found the contact in her apartment, they were visited by a CIA assassin. They barely escaped and decided to link up with a CIA agent who was her contact. On the drive over to the agent's house, she revealed to Blane that there was a thermal imaging map she was supposed to obtain for the CIA. She told Blane that she informed the CIA that he was the one with the map so that they would nt kill her for knowing about it. She explained that she used him as the scapegoat because she felt the Unit was secure enough to not have the government go after it and told him that the location of the map was in a secure safe deposit box in Dallas. When they reached the agent's house, the CIA agent shot her and was then subsequently killed by Blane. Blane, assuming the agent's identity, doctored his passport and returned to the United States with the coffins of both bodies.

After returning Stateside, Blane knew he had to use a woman to pose as the girl to retrieve the map. He correctly deduced that Bob Brown's wife Kim was going to be in Texas staying with her parents and contacted her. As Kim went to retrieve the document while Blane waited outside, he was approached by a local police officer who suspected him of being a jewel thief. Blane gave the officer the doctored passport of the CIA agent he had killed as Kim was returning with the documents. When the officer found out the passport was a fake, he tried to take Blane into custody. Blane eventually struggled free before taking the document from Kim and driving off in Kim's car, making it look like he and Kim did not know each other.

Blane later met up with Grey and Brown and figured out the map was of a location in the ocean off the coast of South America. When the three got there, Blane uncovered a CIA dump site of human bodies.

The Unit later found out that the bodies were of prisoners at the terrorist detention camp at Guantánamo Bay. A rogue group of CIA agents who had ties to the military-industrial complex had been illegally killing the terrorist prisoners and dumping them at this location. The Oil Minister had found out about the grave and thus the rogue group had put in motion the orders that eventually instructed the Unit to do its dirty work by assassinating the Oil Minister originally.

After rescuing Hector Williams and linking up with Colonel Tom Ryan, Blane and the rest of the Unit (without Mack Gerhardt, who was being tortured by the rogue CIA officers) devised a plan to get Mack returned safely. Ryan's wife, Charlotte Ryan, had links to important people in the military industrial complex who wanted to give Tom Ryan a good job and they used the opportunity to meet the man in person at a public dinner where he and the Unit ambushed the man. The two parties struck a deal, allowing the Unit to be reinstated and Mack Gerhardt returned safely in return for the Unit's silence about the grave.

In season 4 Jonas' daughter Betsy Blane was captured in Iraq whilst serving as an army officer there. He led a private mission to rescue her and succeeds in doing so. In the last few episodes of the season Jonas foiled a nuclear attack on Washington. At the end of Season 4, Molly decided to live away from Jonas after he refused to retire for her.

Jonas is Alpha Team's Non-Commissioned Officer in Charge. He is frequently referred to as Top by his team, and the members of his team try to do what he would do in any given situation. However, he is far from infallible and makes several mistakes during the course of the series. His sidearm of choice is a customized Colt .45 automatic but as an off-duty gun he uses a Smith & Wesson .380 pocket pistol. In tropical climates he wears a distinctive Australian slouch hat which he considers a lucky charm. He is a confidant of two different US Presidents who both use him for personal secret missions outside the normal chain of command. His hobbies seem to be collecting antique militaria and fishing. Outside of his teammates his best friend is Ron Cheals, a former member of the Unit who was crippled during a mission and forced into retirement. He is also a friend of Col. Ryan but this is stretched by Ryan's behavior in the later seasons. His radio call sign is Snake Doctor which is Southern US slang for a dragonfly (based on the myth that they follow snakes around and heal their injuries). Years of continual combat have left Jonas with numerous injuries including three pieces of shrapnel close to the spine that would enable him to retire on full disability benefits should he wish to do so. He refuses to retire, however, or take up lucrative private security work, contrary to his wife's wishes.

Jonas' personality is of a hard taskmaster. He effortlessly commands the respect of his men and is extremely patriotic, pushing himself hardest of all. However, this self-centeredness sometimes alienates people outside the Unit in a detrimental manner. He is also very ruthless, never hesitating to kill in cold blood and nearly always putting the mission first. On three occasions he has tortured enemies for information by shooting them in the kneecap and slashing them in the face with a knife. In the course of the series Jonas kills at least 58 people. His medal ribbons include a Bronze Star and Purple Heart although these were presumably awarded before he joined the Unit, whose members do not seem to receive decorations for their heroism. He also wears the Kuwait Liberation Medal, meaning that he began his military career as early at the late 1980s.

In the provisional storyline outlined by the writers for season 5, Jonas would begin an affair with fellow Unit member Bridget Sullivan. When she is killed on a mission mid-season the combat stress that affected him in the first episode resurfaces. Leaving Mack Gerhardt in charge of the team Jonas works through his feelings with the help of his daughter and father, both of whom also experience post traumatic stress disorder (his father also a soldier who earned the Silver Star for his actions during the Korean War), the storyline allowing the series to address the issue of the treatment of traumatized soldiers returning from Iraq and Afghanistan. The series would end with Jonas reuniting with Molly and retiring from the army to help her in her real estate business. According to an interview executive producer Shawn Ryan gave to The Futon Critic "[David] Mamet and I and our writers, we came up with a lot of great stuff," Ryan said about his pitch to CBS executives for a potential fifth season. "It was going to be a whole new show in the sense that we were going to be training some young people, Bob was going to be training some people for a whole new organization. Jonas was finally going to be seeing his run end. The final season was going to be, I figured the fifth season was going to be the last... It was going to be a long, sort of final mission for Jonas. He's not medically cleared, Mac has to go in and sort of change the medical records so that Jonas can keep on [going on missions]. We had a whole thing planned, it was going to be good."

==== Awards and decorations ====
The following are the medals and service awards fictionally worn by Sergeant Major Blane.

Personal decorations
	Distinguished Service Cross
	Defense Distinguished Service Medal
Width-44 white ribbon with width-10 scarlet stripes at edges, separated from the white by width-2 ultramarine blue stripes.	Distinguished Service Medal
	Defense Superior Service Medal
Width-44 crimson ribbon with a pair of width-2 white stripes on the edges	Legion of Merit with one bronze oak leaf cluster
	Bronze Star Medal with one bronze oak leaf cluster and V Device
	Purple Heart with one silver and one bronze oak leaf cluster
Width-44 crimson ribbon with two width-8 white stripes at distance 4 from the edges.	Meritorious Service Medal with one bronze oak leaf cluster
	Joint Service Commendation Medal with one bronze oak leaf cluster and V Device
Width-44 myrtle green ribbon with width-3 white stripes at the edges and five width-1 stripes down the center; the central white stripes are width-2 apart	Army Commendation Medal with two bronze oak leaf clusters and V Device
Unit awards
	Presidential Unit Citation
Width-44 Old Glory red ribbon surrounded by gold frame. The ribbon has a central width-3 Old Glory red stripe flanked by pairs of stripes that are respectively width-3 white, width-3 ultramarine blue, width one-half white and width-2 ultramarine blue.	Valorous Unit Award
	Meritorious Unit Commendation
Service Awards
	Army Good Conduct Medal
Campaign and service medals
	National Defense Service Medal with bronze service star
	Armed Forces Expeditionary Medal with three bronze service stars
	Southwest Asia Service Medal with bronze service star
	Kosovo Campaign Medal
	Global War on Terrorism Expeditionary Medal
	Global War on Terrorism Service Medal
	Humanitarian Service Medal
Service, training, and marksmanship awards
	NCO Professional Development with award numeral 4
	Overseas Service Ribbon with award numeral 3
Foreign awards
	Kuwait Liberation Medal (Saudi Arabia)
	Kuwait Liberation Medal (Kuwait)

Other accoutrements
Combat Infantryman Badge (3rd award)
Master Parachutist Badge
Diver insignia
Air Assault Badge
Pathfinder Badge
United States Army Special Forces Combat Service Identification Badge
Special Forces tab
Ranger tab
5 Overseas Service Bars (reflecting 2½ years of overseas service in combat zones)
7 Service Stripes (reflecting 21 years of service)

=== Molly Blane ===
Molly Blane
- First appearance: First Responders
- Last appearance: Unknown Soldier
- Portrayed by: Regina Taylor

In-universe information
- Occupation: Realtor, Recruiter
- Spouse: Jonas Blane
- Children: Betsy Blane
- Nationality: American

Molly Blane (Regina Taylor) is the wife of Jonas Blane; they have one daughter, Betsy Blane (Angela Wainwright).

In the beginning of the series, she works in real estate. Later on, she works for a private military company called Blackthorne Security.

In a parallel of her husband's leadership position in the Unit, Molly is the de facto matriarch of wives who live on the base. She serves as an adviser and confidant, and tries to help the wives and other soldiers through various personal struggles.

In the penultimate episode, Molly is kidnapped by terrorists, and in the series finale, Molly leaves Jonas, because he does not want to leave the unit.

=== Bob Brown ===
Robert Davis Brown
- First appearance: First Responders
- Last appearance: Unknown Soldier
- Portrayed by: Scott Foley

In-universe information
- Nicknames: Whippoorwill, Cool Breeze, Bob
- Title: Sergeant First Class
- Occupation: U.S. Army Special Forces
- Spouse: Kim Brown
- Children: Serena Brown, Theodore "Teddy" Roosevelt Brown, Emily Brown
- Nationality: American

Sergeant First Class Robert Davis "Bob" Brown (United States Army, call sign: Cool Breeze) (portrayed by Scott Foley) was the newest member of the Unit, after first passing selection, Bob was a little shy, not talking if not addressed; however Bob soon proved himself and is now a valuable member of the Unit. He is married to Kim Brown and they have three children—two daughters, Serena, Emily, and a son, Theodore "Teddy" Roosevelt Brown.

Bob's skills, among other things, include proficiency in a number of fixed-wing and rotary aircraft, due to his prior service in the Air Corps. It is stated twice in the early seasons that Bob has three college degrees.

Brown was a relatively new member of the Unit. He has a wife, Kim, two daughters, Serena and Emily, and a son, Theodore. He is a licensed pilot in both fixed wing aircraft and helicopters and is one of the more skilled marksmen in the Unit, frequently serving as a sharpshooter and sniper. He is competent in Spanish and a Pashto/Urdu dialect. Before entering the Unit, he served in the Air Cavalry and is also Ranger qualified.

During Season 1, upon Brown's first day after Selection and the Unit's Operator Training Course (referred to as OTC Training), as staff sergeant, assisting Sergeant Major Jonas Blane, in laying out a new training course for extended deployment with pack animals. On the same day, terrorists hijack an airplane in the fictional city of Wyndham, Idaho. Brown was a part of the operation to reclaim the airplane, doing his part by eliminating terrorist spotters in the nearby woods.

Brown was responsible for saving the Secretary of State from assassination by radicals in Africa, as well as capturing a United States Air Force cryptologist who was selling secrets to the Chinese. He assisted in the capture of a Bosnian war criminal, which came back to haunt him in the Season 1 finale, as the criminal escaped UN custody and tracked the Unit to their headquarters at Fort Griffith, attacking them while they celebrated Colonel Tom Ryan's marriage.

During Season 2, Brown had become more confident in his skills as a military operator, instructing trainees in the art of being a sniper, during the Unit's Operator Training Course. He was responsible for helping to eliminate one of the world's foremost arms dealers.

Brown's membership in the Unit has at times strained his marriage, such as when he was late returning from a mission in Spain, conducted a mission under the guise of taking his wife on a vacation, and became hospitalized during a SERE exercise.

Near the closing of Season 2, Brown was targeted by the Central Intelligence Agency for recruitment. They used the platform of apparent crimes committed by Jonas Blane to try to recruit them, and ironically, Blane signed off on it, saying that the Unit could use a man within the CIA. After returning from a mission in Cyprus, Brown and Alpha Team found that the United States Army Criminal Investigation Division was investigating Alpha Team, and had shut down the 303rd completely. After finding that the CIA was behind the investigation, Brown was given a choice-join the CIA, or go to prison. His wife, Kim, convinced him to join the Agency. Brown's first assignment: find and bring back to custody the disappeared Jonas Blane.

At the beginning of Season 3, Brown was in pursuit of Jonas Blane at the behest of the CIA, but later teamed up with Jonas & other team members to successfully break the CIA conspiracy.

During "Five Brothers" Brown was left no choice but to kill a Lebanese teenager to avoid detection. In the episode "Gone Missing", he started to see visions of people whom he killed during previous missions, involving that boy in particular. When the Unit is tasked with an assassination mission in Eastern Europe, Brown makes an obvious mistake that could have compromised the mission. Jonas begins to question Bob's capability; however, Bob was soon able to defeat his emotions by accepting he liked killing and the mission was carried out as planned after Gerhart, Blane and Grey were all unable to take the shot on the target. Afterwards he seems to lose any hesitation and even kills an unarmed couple in cold blood in front of his wife. It is also revealed he was abused by his father when he was young, when Brown and Blane were in their position scouting the target area, Brown witnessed a small boy being beaten with his father. After the mission had been carried out and the unit was regrouping, Brown held back a second and tracked down the abusive father. He broke into their house and beat the father, telling him that he 'Brown' is watching and to never lay another hand on the boy again—leaving with the father a rifle round as a reminder. It is also revealed he was abused by his father when he was young, a trait he shares with Colonel Tom Ryan, many Special Forces soldiers having notably overcome adversity at a young age. Bob develops an addiction to heroin having been forcibly injected with it during a mission but with Kim's help he kicks the habit

During "Side Angle Side," Brown was promoted to the rank of Sergeant First Class.

Bob is possibly the most level-headed member of the team, persuading Mack to consult the team over Tiffy's affair with Colonel Ryan rather than just immediately shooting him. Bob is also the only Unit member to not have the Purple Heart. Although wounded numerous times during the course of the series member of the Unit are never awarded medals (his decorations including a Bronze Star stem from 2 tours in Iraq with the Air Cavalry). In the course of the series he kills at least 30 people. Bob used the call signs Moreno and Whippoorwill in early operations; however, they appear to have been compromised so he currently goes by the call sign "Cool Breeze". Bob drives a vintage Mustang with just the primer coat, which he sells in order to better provide for his family. Before being accepted into the Unit Bob and Kim were planning on him attending law school. He is unusual in having a son, as most Unit members tend to have only daughters.

According to the writers if the series continued into a fifth season, the plan was Bob would have been badly injured in a parachute training jump leaving him with a permanent limp. He would have been aided in his recuperation by veteran Ron Cheals and Crystal Burn's badly scarred ex-boyfriend Jeremy, allowing the series to tackle the controversy over the Army's treatment of injured soldiers. He would eventually leave the Army and be recruited by the CIA as an instructor and their official liaison with the Unit, their intention being that he can provide them with inside information on the organization. In fact he is still working for Colonel Ryan and providing them with disinformation, acting as the Unit's man within the CIA. According to an interview executive producer Shawn Ryan gave to The Futon Critic "[David] Mamet and I and our writers, we came up with a lot of great stuff," Ryan said about his pitch to CBS executives for a potential fifth season. "It was going to be a whole new show in the sense that we were going to be training some young people, Bob was going to be training some people for a whole new organization"

==== Awards and decorations ====
The following are the medals and service awards fictionally worn by Sergeant First Class Brown.

Personal decorations
	Bronze Star Medal with V Device
Width-44 crimson ribbon with two width-8 white stripes at distance 4 from the edges.	Meritorious Service Medal
	Joint Service Commendation Medal
Width-44 myrtle green ribbon with width-3 white stripes at the edges and five width-1 stripes down the center; the central white stripes are width-2 apart	Army Commendation Medal with three bronze oak leaf clusters
Service Awards
	Army Good Conduct Medal
Campaign and service medals
	National Defense Service Medal with bronze service star
	Southwest Asia Service Medal with bronze service star
	Global War on Terrorism Expeditionary Medal
	Global War on Terrorism Service Medal
Service, training, and marksmanship awards
	Army Service Ribbon
	Overseas Service Ribbon

Other accoutrements
Combat Infantryman Badge
Master Parachutist Badge
Army Expert Marksmanship Badge
Ranger tab
3 Overseas Service Bars (reflecting 1½ years of overseas service in combat zones)
2 Service Stripes (reflecting 6 years of service)

=== Kim Brown ===
Kimberly Brown
- First appearance: First Responders
- Portrayed by: Audrey Marie Anderson

In-universe information
- Nickname: Kim
- Occupation: College Student, Radio DJ (part-time), Stay-at-Home Mom
- Spouse: Bob Brown
- Children: Serena Brown, Theodore "Teddy" Roosevelt Brown, Emily Brown
- Nationality: American

Kim Brown (portrayed by Audrey Marie Anderson) is the loyal wife of the now Sergeant First Class Bob Brown. In the first season, she and Bob, then a staff sergeant, are new arrivals to the Unit. At first, she is confused by the new rules of the wives of Unit team members, but soon Jonas Blane's wife, Molly, takes Kim under her wing and shows her the ropes.

In the first season, Kim becomes pregnant with her second child; she and Bob also have a daughter named Serena. In order to help to provide for their growing family, and to keep herself occupied, she takes a job at a local radio station known as KTML "The Missile". Between the 1st and 2nd seasons of the show their son, Theodore "Teddy" Roosevelt Brown, is born.

Her closest friend in the group is Tiffy Gerhardt, although Kim sometimes will distance herself from Tiffy due to the bad decisions that Tiffy continually seems to make.

Between season 3 and 4 Kim and Bob's 2nd daughter, Emily, was born. In the series finale, Bob met Emily in person, to his joy.

=== Mack Gerhardt ===
MacDonald James Gerhardt
- First appearance: First Responders
- Last appearance: Unknown Soldier
- Portrayed by: Max Martini

In-universe information
- Nicknames: Mack, Dirt Diver
- Title: Master Sergeant
- Occupation: US Army Special Forces
- Spouse: Tiffy Gerhardt
- Children: Lissy Gerhardt, Jenny Gerhardt
- Nationality: American

Master Sergeant MacDonald James "Mack" Gerhardt, call sign: Dirt Diver (portrayed by Max Martini), is a former United States Army Ranger and paratrooper with the 101st Airborne, and a senior Unit operator. He holds the rank of Master Sergeant (E-8). His wife, Tiffy, and he have two daughters.

Gerhardt is second in command of Alpha Team, 1st Special Actions Group (official cover name "303rd Logistical Studies Group"). He is fluent in Italian and German; and while competent at submarine lock in/lock-out procedures, is slightly claustrophobic.

Gerhardt has worked as an operator with Blane and his team on a multitude of missions, including the recovery of a radioactive component of a Chinese satellite, the rescue of the drug minister of Mexico, the assassination of a terrorist financier in Spain, the bugging of an Iranian official's car at their embassy in Beirut, the recovery of seven Stinger Missiles from a Brazilian arms dealer, and the apprehension of a Serbian war criminal in the Balkans.

During the third episode of the first season, 200th Hour, Mack is accidentally shot during a live fire training course by Bob Brown. It is later discovered that the incident occurred because Mack had entered Brown's sector without Brown noticing. He also has an altercation with his wife. The reactions of Mrs. Blane and the Colonel suggest something similar might have happened before.

During the seventh episode of the first season, Dedication, Mack is offered charge of his own team by Ryan, but turns the offer down, instead preferring to continue serving with his friend Jonas.

At the end of the first season, the Unit assisted a UN military unit in apprehending General Razlan Dragovich, a Yugoslavian war criminal. During the raid, the General's wife was shot and killed by a UN soldier; however from the General's position, it appeared that Blaine fired the fatal shot. After Dragovich escaped UN custody, he tracked the Unit back to their home base at Fort Griffith. When the team and their families went off post to celebrate the marriage of Unit commander Colonel Tom Ryan, Dragovich and his men attacked. They killed several restaurant employees and injured both Blane and the newly married Mrs. Ryan.

A few months later, during the second season, Gerhardt prepared to leave the Unit at the behest of his wife, but Tiffy decided to rescind her request and ripped up Gerhardt's transfer papers. Since then, he and the Unit took down the world's foremost weapons dealer, and helped take out a rebel leader in Paraguay.

In the episode Johnny B. Goode, Mack and the team were in Iran to determine its Weapons of Mass Destruction capability. Mack killed a goatherd who would have compromised the mission, as well as their local contact after an explosion's debris pinned her to the ground to spare her from imminent capture, torture and death. When he returned home, he and Tiffy have an argument and Mack goes to a bar and gets drunk. While there, he punches a patron and before a fight breaks out, he is led outside by Crystal Burns, the young fiancée of a former Alpha Team support staffer. Crystal offers to drive Mack home, but after discussing their sorrows with each others, they end up having sex in her car in the bar's parking lot.

The next day, she shows up at his home, hoping to pursue an affair with him, but Mack rejects her, telling her the one night stand was a mistake and he doesn't want to risk losing his marriage over it. She attempts to get revenge by contacting a reporter and telling him about the Unit. The reporter starts poking around the base, trying to learn more about Mack to try to build a story, but is quickly shut down once SGM Blane gets involved. He has the reporter arrested, which leads to the discovery of (possibly planted) top secret documents in his car. He then threatens to send him to Guantanamo Bay, Cuba as a national security threat. Ultimately, after convincing the reporter that Crystal is psychologically unstable (with fake medical records), he gives him the option to drop the story and leave for good. After this defeat, Mack convinces Crystal to also leave the base for good, which she does as she has no interest in taking care of her disabled fiancée.

At the end of the second season, Gerhardt and Williams were placed in prison for unnamed actions which they committed on a mission. Brown manages to escape this fate by becoming a double agent to the CIA; while Grey disappears and Blane goes into hiding.

At the start of the third season, Gerhardt was brutally tortured by the CIA, but later released soon after other team members threatened members of the CIA.

Like Jonas, he uses a customized Colt .45 as his sidearm, he is obviously a fan of the weapon, complimenting Bridget Sullian for using one and recommending Sam McBride do the same. His off-duty gun is a Colt .32 pistol and he also has a Smith & Wesson .38 'throwaway gun'.

In many ways Mack is the toughest and most ruthless member of the Unit, never hesitating to kill in cold blood and even going undercover as a bare knuckle fighter. His weak spot is his volatile relationship with Tiffy. Mack was nearly dismissed from the Unit several times due to their behaviour.

When Mack suspects that Tiffy is having an affair with a lawyer she has been working with, he obtains an untraceable gun and plots to kill him. When he finally discovers that she has been having an affair with Colonel Ryan, teammate Bob Brown has to physically restrain him from killing the Colonel. He later tries to kill Ryan while on a combat mission but eventually cannot bring himself to do so, mindful of his own adultery with Crystal, as well as a threesome he had with a pair of Russian prostitutes while on foreign assignment. Eventually Mack and Tiffy reconcile after he confesses his own affairs to her.

Kim Brown suggests that the reason Tiffy loves Mack so deeply is that she had an abusive upbringing and is therefore attracted to violent men. In her husband she found a violent man who could control his impulses by channeling them into his work. Over the course of the series Mack kills at least 35 people.

According to the writers in the provisional storyline for the planned fifth season, Mack would take over command of the team after Jonas succumbs to combat stress. However, when Tiffy becomes pregnant with their third child he would apply to become an officer and at the end of the season he would leave the Unit for a non-combat training post in order to better provide for his family. According to executive producer Shawn Ryan

The final season was going to be, I figured the fifth season was going to be the last... It was going to be a long, sort of final mission for Jonas. He's not medically cleared, Mac has to go in and sort of change the medical records so that Jonas can keep on [going on missions]. We had a whole thing planned, it was going to be good.

==== Awards and decorations ====
The following are the medals and service awards fictionally worn by Master Sergeant Gerhardt.

Personal decorations
	Silver Star
	Bronze Star Medal with one bronze oak leaf cluster and V Device
	Purple Heart with three bronze oak leaf clusters
Width-44 crimson ribbon with two width-8 white stripes at distance 4 from the edges.	Meritorious Service Medal with two bronze oak leaf clusters
	Joint Service Commendation Medal
Width-44 myrtle green ribbon with width-3 white stripes at the edges and five width-1 stripes down the center; the central white stripes are width-2 apart	Army Commendation Medal
Width-44 ribbon with two width-9 ultramarine blue stripes surrounded by two pairs of two width-4 green stripes; all these stripes are separated by width-2 white borders	Army Achievement Medal
Unit awards
	Presidential Unit Citation
Width-44 Old Glory red ribbon surrounded by gold frame. The ribbon has a central width-3 Old Glory red stripe flanked by pairs of stripes that are respectively width-3 white, width-3 ultramarine blue, width one-half white and width-2 ultramarine blue.	Valorous Unit Award
	Meritorious Unit Commendation
Service Awards
	Army Good Conduct Medal
Campaign and service medals
	National Defense Service Medal with bronze service star
	Armed Forces Expeditionary Medal
	Kosovo Campaign Medal
	Global War on Terrorism Expeditionary Medal
	Global War on Terrorism Service Medal
	Humanitarian Service Medal
Service, training, and marksmanship awards
	NCO Professional Development
	Army Service Ribbon
	Army Sea Duty Ribbon

Other accoutrements
Combat Infantryman Badge (2nd award)
Master Parachutist Badge
Diver insignia
Army Expert Marksmanship Badge
101st Airborne Division Combat Service Identification Badge
Ranger tab
8 Overseas Service Bars (reflecting 4 years of overseas service in combat zones)
5 Service Stripes (reflecting 15 years of service)

=== Tiffy Gerhardt ===
Tiffany Gerhardt
- First appearance: First Responders
- Last appearance: Unknown Soldier
- Portrayed by: Abby Brammell

In-universe information
- Nickname: Tiffy
- Occupation: Teacher (Season 1); Stripper
- Spouse: Mack Gerhardt
- Significant other: Tom Ryan
- Children: Lissy and Jenny Gerhardt
- Nationality: American

Tiffany "Tiffy" Gerhardt is (portrayed by Abby Brammell) is the wife of Mack Gerhardt. She and her husband have two daughters, Lissy and Jenn. Mack and Tiffy have a very strained relationship; Mack's quick temper causes violent and abusive outbursts, while Tiffy is a serial philanderer, most notably in an affair with the Unit's commander, Colonel Tom Ryan.

When first Kim, then Lissy, discovers Tiffy's infidelity, Tiffy's life begins to unravel: although she ended the affair before either of them learned of it, Mack eventually discovers a photograph of Tiffy with Colonel Ryan. After Tiffy's tearful confession and threats of suicide, Mack has to be physically restrained from killing the Colonel.

Knowing that she has jeopardized her marriage, Tiffy files for divorce and takes a job as an exotic dancer to pay the bills, although she and Mack slowly resolve their differences. Eventually, Tiffy and Mack salvage their marriage, but not before an accident in their garage (unrelated to their marital problems), forces Colonel Ryan to move Mack into the BEQ (Bachelor Enlisted Quarters), with orders that he is not to return to the Gerhardt home unless under escort by base personnel.

=== Charles Grey ===
Charles Lewis Grey
- First appearance: "First Responders"
- Last appearance: "Unknown Soldier"
- Portrayed by: Michael Irby

In-universe information
- Nicknames: Betty Blue, Carlito
- Title: Sergeant First Class
- Occupation: U.S. Army Special Forces
- Significant other: Joss Morgan
- Nationality: American

Sergeant First Class Charles Lewis Grey (United States Army, call sign Betty Blue) (portrayed by Michael Irby) is a Unit operator whose specialty is electronics, engineering, and explosives, and is also trained as a medic. He is proficient in many other languages, including Spanish, French, Arabic, and Korean. Before his service in the Army, he was a member of a Latino gang called the "Byz-Lats" based in Farmington, Los Angeles.

According to an interview with Michael Irby, Grey has been an operator with the Alpha Team of the 1st Special Actions Group (official cover as the "303rd Logistical Studies Group") for roughly six years, and is single. He is also something of a womanizer, as well as a bit of a hothead; during Season 1, Episode 7, "SERE", upon learning that Alpha Team had been "captured" and were prisoners of war, Grey rushed and struck the guard, an action he repeated later in the episode.

Grey's appearance makes him ideal for undercover operations, particularly in the Middle East and in Latin America. He can speak conversational Spanish, Portuguese, French, Arabic, and Korean, in addition to English. Like all Unit members, he is HALO qualified, and is qualified in submarine lock in/lock out procedures. Despite serving as the team's primary engineer/demolition specialist (possibly having been an 18 Charlie "United States Army Special Forces Engineer Sergeant"), he is also cross-trained as a medic.

During Season 1, Grey participated in an operation in the fictional town of Wyndham, Idaho, to recover hostages taken by Islamic terrorists. The action incurred the wrath of the FBI, as the Alpha Team LSU members had violated the Posse Comitatus Act. However, Grey and the remainder of Alpha Team were cleared of any wrongdoing.

Grey, in conjunction with Alpha Team, was also responsible for the recovery of a radioactive component of a Chinese satellite, rescuing the drug minister of Mexico, the assassination of a terrorist financier in Spain, the recovery of seven Stinger missiles from Brazilian arms dealers, and the apprehension of a Serbian war criminal in The Balkans.

Grey is also a demolitions expert-during Episode 1x12, "Morale, Recreation, and Welfare", Grey, Blane, and Williams were sent to Atlanta, Georgia, to advise the FBI on a bomb threat, possibly a nuclear bomb. Grey did most of the bomb inspections, and was the one that determined that the bomb was not nuclear-the bomb maker had sprinkled plutonium around the bomb in order to set off the Geiger counter.

While in the Balkans, the aforementioned war criminal got a good look at team leader Jonas Blane. When the criminal escaped from UN custody, he tracked Blane back to Fort Griffith, the Alpha Team's headquarters. When Alpha Team went off post to celebrate the marriage of Unit commander Colonel Tom Ryan, the war criminal struck, killing a few workers and injuring Charlotte Ryan and Sergeant Major Blane.

During Season 2, Grey helped prevent the spread of weaponized smallpox throughout the world by members of al-Qaeda. He was also responsible for helping Sergeant Major Blane's wife, Molly, train a young Unit support staffer in offensive driving in order to qualify him for a job with Blackthorne Security, a private military company. Along with Hector Williams, he instructed a SWAT unit in advanced closed quarters battle tactics, and designed the deliberate assault plan for the Braydon School takedown in "In Loco Parentis". He along with Mack Gerhardt, served as a spotter, for Bob Brown and Hector Williams, who were snipers, when they engaged vehicles and personnel at 2320 m during the "Dark of the Moon" episode.

When the Unit was on lockdown pending an Article 32 hearing, Grey decided to escape Federal uniform and civilian custody by going AWOL. His whereabouts were unknown until the Season 3 premiere, where it turns out he linked up with Jonas in Panama City, Panama.

In the episode "Five Brothers" Grey was severely wounded by a gunshot but survived until the team was extracted by Marines. Though he survived, his best friend Hector Williams was killed when trying to aid him.

In the episode "Binary Explosion" it was revealed that Grey had past history with the Hispanic gang "Byz-Lats" and that his late mother had been the last of his only real family.

In season 4 he meets Joss Morgan and falls in love with her. Though it becomes hard for the two of them to marry because of her Russian relations, he and Joss do get married in the series finale.

He customarily uses a SIG Sauer 9mm pistol, the same weapon as Hector. His fighting style is based on the Israeli martial art of Krav Maga, a trait based on actor Michael Irby who is a student of it in real life. As a hobby Grey writes poetry. According to Grey his old roommate Hector Williams considered him 'cheap'. In the course of the series he kills at least 28 people.

According to the writers in the provisional storyline for season 5, Grey's marriage to Joss Morgan would cause difficulties as she is an independent woman and not prepared to submit to the normal restrictions of a Unit member's wife. With Jonas' retirement and Mack leaving the Unit for a training post, Grey is promoted to team leader at the end of the season and trains up new recruits in order to bring the squad up to full strength.

==== Awards and decorations ====
The following are the medals and service awards fictionally worn by Sergeant First Class Grey.

Personal decorations
Width-44 crimson ribbon with two width-8 white stripes at distance 4 from the edges.	Meritorious Service Medal with two oak leaf clusters
	Joint Service Commendation Medal
Width-44 myrtle green ribbon with width-3 white stripes at the edges and five width-1 stripes down the center; the central white stripes are width-2 apart	Army Commendation Medal with oak leaf cluster
	Joint Service Achievement Medal
Width-44 ribbon with two width-9 ultramarine blue stripes surrounded by two pairs of two width-4 green stripes; all these stripes are separated by width-2 white borders	Army Achievement Medal with oak leaf cluster
	Army Good Conduct Medal with two service loops
Unit awards
	Presidential Unit Citation
	Meritorious Unit Commendation
Campaign and service medals
	National Defense Service Medal with bronze service star
	Iraq Campaign Medal
	Global War on Terrorism Expeditionary Medal
	Global War on Terrorism Service Medal
	Humanitarian Service Medal
Service, training, and marksmanship awards
	NCO Professional Development
	Army Service Ribbon
	Overseas Service Ribbon

Other accoutrements
Combat Infantryman Badge
Master Parachutist Badge
Diver insignia
Army Expert Marksmanship Badge
United States Army Special Forces Combat Service Identification Badge
Special Forces tab
3 Overseas Service Bars (reflecting 1 and 1/2 years of overseas service in combat zones)
3 Service Stripes (reflecting 9 years of service)

=== Hector Williams ===
Hector Lucian Williams
- First appearance: First Responders
- Last appearance: Five Brothers
- Portrayed by: Demore Barnes

In-universe information
- Nickname: Hammerhead
- Title: Sergeant First Class
- Occupation: U.S. Army Special Forces
- Family: George and Carol Williams (parents); oldest son in his family
- Significant others: Fiancee (Season 1), Annie (Season 3)
- Nationality: American

Sergeant First Class Hector Lucian Williams (United States Army, call sign: Hammerhead) (portrayed by Demore Barnes) was a Unit operator assigned to Alpha Team of the 1st Special Actions Group (official cover as the "303rd Logistical Studies Group"). He was an experienced marksman, and frequently served as a sharpshooter for the team. According to his uniform, he was both Ranger and Special Forces qualified. Williams was likely the most diverse member of Alpha Team. He served as one of the team's medics, and was possibly an SF medical sergeant prior to joining the Unit. He was also cross trained in breaching demolitions. He, along with Charles Grey, also served as an instructor in close quarters battle for a SWAT unit, and designed the deliberate assault plan for the Braydon School Takedown in the "In Loco Parentis" episode. He was fluent in Arabic and Spanish, as well as Papuan Tok Pisin, and could speak German, Portuguese and a Pashto/Urdu dialect. Hector's cover was that of a "logistics clerk".

In Season 1, Hector was engaged to the daughter of a retired paratrooper who looked upon Hector with disdain due to his career in "logistics". The paratrooper was familiar with Colonel Tom Ryan, and asked for Hector to be transferred to the 82nd Airborne Division. Ryan let the father know subtly that Hector was not in logistics but actually a counter-terrorist. The father's attitude toward Hector changed, which Hector's fiancée noticed. He came clean to her that he was in counter-terrorism, and she, not seeing job security out of the Army in his future, ended the relationship.

In Season 3, Hector met a woman named Annie at a local bar. She was a waitress and former US Army medic who happened to know Tiffany. They went on a date and then shortly thereafter (with some encouragement from the other Unit women) met up at a local motel in a nearby town. While there, Hector discovered Tiffy and Colonel Ryan having an affair.

During the Season 3 episode "Five Brothers," Hector was killed when he was hit in the neck with a bullet fired by a sniper as the team made its escape from Hezbollah during the rescue mission in Beirut; the sniper's bullet ricocheted from a bone in Hector's neck into his chest whilst caring for injured teammate Charles Grey. The irony of this is that during the episode, and also during the episode's promotional spots, Hector's roommate, Charles, was speculated as being killed, but survives the ordeal due to Williams' medical efforts.

In "Play 16", the cover for his death was that he was transporting documents across an airfield in Turkey when unexploded ordnance blew up, rolling his jeep and killing him instantly. This scenario is called "Play 16." His tombstone gives his dates of birth and death as February 12, 1981 - November 6, 2007.

Williams' death caused controversy with fans. None of the cast, including actor Demore Barnes who portrayed Hector Williams, were aware that his character would be killed off until they received the script for the episode. The character was a fan favorite, and the writers and producers chose to kill off Williams to retain an air of believability in the storylines that some times, the good guys and heroes do get killed in combat. There was also a significant number of fans who at first believed that Williams was killed off in secret on the orders of Colonel Tom Ryan by an unknown assassin, due to Williams accidentally catching Ryan dead to rights in an affair with Tiffy Gerhardt (Mack's wife) at a hotel they coincidentally all wound up staying at off post. It was theorized that Williams was killed off by Ryan to keep the affair secret, though the idea of Ryan killing off Williams was disproven in the series plot later.

==== Awards and decorations ====
The following are the medals and service awards fictionally worn by Sergeant First Class Williams.

Personal decorations
	Silver Star
	Bronze Star Medal
	Purple Heart
Width-44 myrtle green ribbon with width-3 white stripes at the edges and five width-1 stripes down the center; the central white stripes are width-2 apart	Army Commendation Medal
Width-44 ribbon with two width-9 ultramarine blue stripes surrounded by two pairs of two width-4 green stripes; all these stripes are separated by width-2 white borders	Army Achievement Medal
	Army Good Conduct Medal with two loops
Unit awards
	Presidential Unit Citation
	Meritorious Unit Commendation
'Campaign and Service medals
	National Defense Service Medal with bronze service star
	Southwest Asia Service Medal with two bronze service stars
	Global War on Terrorism Expeditionary Medal
	Global War on Terrorism Service Medal
	Overseas Service Ribbon with award numeral 4

Other accoutrements
Combat Infantryman Badge
Master Parachutist Badge
Air Assault Badge
Army Expert Marksmanship Badge
United States Army Special Forces Combat Service Identification Badge
Special Forces tab
Ranger tab
4 Service Stripes (reflecting 12 years of service)

=== Tom Ryan ===
Thomas R. Ryan
- First appearance: First Responders
- Last appearance: Unknown Soldier
- Portrayed by: Robert Patrick

In-universe information
- Nicknames: Tom, dog patch 06
- Title(s): Colonel (Seasons 1 - 4), Brigadier General (final episode)
- Occupation: U.S. Army Special Forces
- Spouse: Charlotte Canning Ryan
- Significant other: Tiffy Gerhardt (Season 1)
- Nationality: American

Brigadier General Tom Ryan (portrayed by Robert Patrick) is the colonel on the series.

During Season 1, Colonel Ryan was having an affair with Tiffy Gerhardt, the wife of Mack Gerhardt, but breaks that off before Season 2 and marries Charlotte Canning, a Washington insider. The newly wed Charlotte was shot twice in the back when a Serbian war criminal discovered the Unit's headquarters and attacked Alpha Team at Ryan's post-wedding celebration. In early Season 3, Ryan finds out that his wife, Charlotte, has been selling secret information about his unit and rogue CIA agents use it against him and his unit. After successfully breaking out the CIA's conspiracy, he decides to end his marriage. He joined the army after being beaten by his stepfather, just as Bob Brown did, many Special Forces soldiers having overcome adversity at a young age.

His middle name was listed as starting with an R, indicated by the initial both on the Unit's sign and when Colonel Ryan was attempting to mail orders to discreet locations, but a police detective gave Ryan's full name as "Thomas Culver Ryan". This discrepancy has not been explained.

In the last episode, Ryan accepted that he must leave the Unit having lost the trust of his men due to his affair with Tiffy and subterfuge with Sam McBride. Instead he accepted promotion to become a brigadier general.

In the course of the series, he kills 8 people.

According to the writers had the series continued into a fifth season, the now Brigadier General Ryan would realize that his promotion had actually sidelined him into a meaningless staff post. He would eventually resume his relationship with his ex-wife Charlotte and at the end of the series, call in the numerous favors owed to him in order to resume control of the Unit.

==== Awards and decorations ====
The following are the medals and service awards fictionally worn by General Ryan.

Personal decorations
Width-44 white ribbon with width-10 scarlet stripes at edges, separated from the white by width-2 ultramarine blue stripes.	Distinguished Service Medal
	Silver Star
Width-44 crimson ribbon with a pair of width-2 white stripes on the edges	Legion of Merit
	Bronze Star Medal with V Device
	Purple Heart
	Defense Meritorious Service Medal
Width-44 crimson ribbon with two width-8 white stripes at distance 4 from the edges.	Meritorious Service Medal with one bronze oak leaf cluster
	Joint Service Commendation Medal with one bronze oak leaf cluster
Width-44 myrtle green ribbon with width-3 white stripes at the edges and five width-1 stripes down the center; the central white stripes are width-2 apart	Army Commendation Medal with two bronze oak leaf clusters
Width-44 ribbon with two width-9 ultramarine blue stripes surrounded by two pairs of two width-4 green stripes; all these stripes are separated by width-2 white borders	Army Achievement Medal with one silver oak leaf cluster
Unit awards
	Presidential Unit Citation
	Joint Meritorious Unit Award
	Meritorious Unit Commendation
Campaign and service medals
	National Defense Service Medal
	Southwest Asia Service Medal with two bronze service stars
	Kosovo Campaign Medal
	Afghanistan Campaign Medal with bronze service star
	Iraq Campaign Medal
	Global War on Terrorism Expeditionary Medal
Foreign awards
	United Nations Medal
	Multinational Force and Observers Medal
	Kuwait Liberation Medal (Saudi Arabia)
	Kuwait Liberation Medal (Kuwait)

Other accoutrements
Combat Infantryman Badge (2nd award)
Master Parachutist Badge
Army Expert Marksmanship Badge
1st Infantry Division Combat Service Identification Badge
United States Army Forces Command Combat Service Identification Badge
Ranger tab
4 Overseas Service Bars (reflecting 2 years of overseas service in combat zones)

=== Bridget Sullivan ===
Bridget Sullivan
- First appearance: Sacrifice
- Last appearance: Unknown Soldier
- Portrayed by: Nicole Steinwedell

In-universe information
- Nickname: Red Cap
- Title: Warrant Officer
- Occupation: U.S. Army Special Forces
- Family: 4 brothers
- Nationality: American

Warrant Officer 1 Bridget Sullivan (United States Army, call sign "Red Cap") is a United States Army soldier who joined the Unit during the events of the Season 4 episode "Sacrifice". While undercover with an arms dealer for 18 months, Bridget was instrumental in the Unit's success in eliminating the dealer's threat. En route back to the United States the team is called back into action to answer an attack on the presidential line of succession. Terrorists had penetrated the military itself, posing as National Guard troopers and even going so far as to obtain the day's safety word.

In the Season 4 episode "Into Hell, Part 2", she risks her career by ordering helicopters to cross the border into Syria to rescue the rest of the Unit, the team later blackmailing the CIA in order to get her reinstated.

While the men of the Unit accept her, the attitude of the Unit wives to Bridget is less certain, especially as she is instrumental in having them rehoused as a security measure at the beginning of season 4. It is noticeable the women do not seem to socialize with her or welcome her to the group as they do with the new male Unit members and their families.

She is almost raped by Sam McBride, who only did so to provide a convincing cover for himself to leave the Unit in disgrace and be recruited as a mercenary for a terrorist group. In the last episode he apologizes to her and she seems to accept it whilst keeping distance between them.

She often serves in the TOC and is often used in the undercover role but not in straight combat missions. She carries a Colt .45 automatic pistol as a sidearm (something which impresses Mack Gerhardt) and a .22 derringer as a backup weapon. She also uses a Colt .32 to rescue Bob Brown in 'Misled and Misguided'. She is highly intelligent and speaks fluent Arabic and French, and like the rest of the team is willing and able to kill in cold blood if ordered to, such as the assassination she executes in "Best Laid Plans".

According to the writers; in season 5, Bridget would have discovered that Sam was gay and become his confidant. She would have entered into a relationship with Jonas Blane, but eventually break it off as she would fear that his feelings for her are clouding his tactical judgement. She is instrumental in helping Colonel Ryan recruit and train more women into the Unit. In the mid-season, she would be mortally wounded on a mission, her dying words forgiving Sam for the fake rape, her death in turn aggravating Jonas' combat stress. One of her brothers would refuse to accept the cover story surrounding her death and ally himself with the human rights group attempting to expose and prosecute the Unit.

=== Sam McBride ===
Samuel McBride
- First appearance: Hero
- Last appearance: Unknown Soldier
- Portrayed by: Wes Chatham

In-universe information
- Nickname: Whiplash
- Title: Staff Sergeant
- Occupation: U.S. Army Special Forces

Staff Sergeant Sam McBride (United States Army, call sign "Whiplash") joins the Unit in the middle of the fourth season and is put through a nerve-shredding final test of loyalty where he is apparently arrested by the ATF who hold him responsible for the death of a judge during a training exercise. We later learn this is due to him having a reputation among his peers as being something of a loner. He passes the test and takes part in five operations as part of the Unit's Alpha Team with great success, including helping to kill the sniper who shot dead his predecessor.

However, he appears to develop an obsession with fellow Unit member Bridget Sullivan, which takes a serious turn. Little is known about his background, as only one ex-girlfriend has resurfaced and he appears to have a very casual, shallow relationship with her. He uses a Glock 9mm pistol, despite Mack Gerhardt trying to persuade him to switch to a Colt 45. He appears to be very skilled in the art of freerunning, jumping from object to object without ever touching the ground. He is very resourceful and technically adroit, specifically in the practice of escape and evasion. He is also extremely ruthless when he needs to be."

According to the writers; in season 5, it was planned that Bridget Sullivan would discover that Sam is actually gay, hence his reputation as a loner and his lack of long term relationships with women. He agonizes over whether or not to come out to his macho colleagues, allowing the series to tackle the controversy over the US military's "Don't ask, don't tell" policy on homosexuality. Ironically given their history Bridget would become his trusted confidant and when she is mortally wounded on a mission her dying words are to forgive him for the fake rape he made her endure. At the end of the season Sam would have been promoted to assistant team leader and aid Charles Grey in training new recruits in order to bring Alpha Team up to full strength.

== Supporting characters ==
=== Betsy Blane ===
2nd Lieutenant Elizabeth "Betsy" Blane, United States Army (Angela Wainwright) is the daughter of Jonas and Molly Blane. She is smart and very independent minded.

Betsy enlisted in the Army in "Every Step You Take" (2007, episode 3.4). After completing basic training, she was selected for Officer Candidate School in "Gone Missing" (2007, episode 3.10). By "Into Hell, Part 1" (2008, episode 4.7), Betsy is a platoon leader for the 505th Transportation Supply Corps, attached to the 101st Airborne Division. She was taken prisoner along with three other members of her platoon in Iraq and taken across the border into Syria. She was rescued by the Unit, and in "Hero" (2009, episode 4.15), she was awarded the Purple Heart and POW Medal. She was also offered the Bronze Star, but turned it down because she did not feel she had earned it.

She appears in: "Non-Permissive Environment" (2006, episode 1.5), "Silver Star" (2006, episode 2.11), "Every Step You Take" (2007, episode 3.4), "Gone Missing" (2007, episode 3.10), "Into Hell, Part 1" (2008, episode 4.7), "Into Hell, Part 2" (2008, episode 4.8), and "Hero" (2009, episode 4.15).

==== Awards and decorations ====
The following are the medals and service awards fictionally worn by Lieutenant Blane.

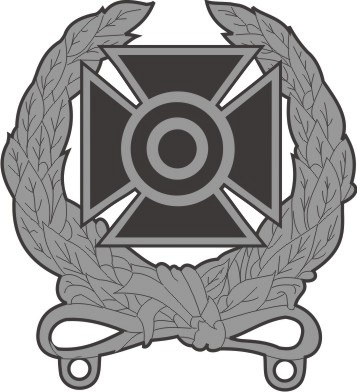
Purple Heart
Prisoner of War Medal
National Defense Service Medal
Global War on Terrorism Service Medal
Army Service Ribbon
Army Expert Marksmanship Badge

=== Joss Morgan ===
Joss Morgan (Bre Blair) is the love interest, and then wife of Charles Grey. In Season 4, this aviation company heiress meets and falls in love with Charles Grey. Though it becomes hard for the two of them to marry because of her Russian relations, she and Charles do get married in the series finale. According to the writers in the provisional storyline for season 5, Grey's marriage to Joss would cause difficulties, as she is an independent woman and not prepared to submit to the normal restrictions of a Unit member's wife.

She appears in: "Switchblade" (2008, episode 4.11), "The Last Nazi" (2009, episode 4.14), "Flesh & Blood" (2009, episode 4.17), "Best Laid Plans" (2009, episode 4.18), "Unknown Soldier" (2009, episode 4.22),

=== Charlotte Ryan ===
Charlotte Canning (Rebecca Pidgeon), a Washington insider, marries Colonel Tom Ryan at the end of season 1 (in "The Wall" (2006, episode 1.13)). The newly wed Charlotte is shot twice in the back when a Serbian war criminal discovers the Unit's headquarters and attacks Alpha Team at Ryan's post-wedding celebration.

In Season 2, Charlotte is on the brink of legal trouble when she runs another driver off the road while under the influence of drugs, a crime that Tiffy Gerhardt takes the heat for.

In early Season 3, Col. Ryan discovers that Charlotte, has been selling secret information about his unit, and rogue CIA agents use it against him and his unit. After successfully breaking out the CIA's conspiracy, he decides to end the marriage. In a later episode, he appears to have an affair with his ex-wife, but is still pining for Tiffy.

According to the writers, had the series continued into a fifth season the now Brigadier General Ryan would realize that his promotion had actually sidelined him into a meaningless staff post. He would eventually resume his relationship with his ex-wife Charlotte.

She appears in: "The Wall" (2006, episode 1.13), "Change of Station" (2006, episode 2.1), "The Kill Zone" (2006, episode 2.3), "Old Home Week (2006, episode 2.6),"Off the Meter" (2006, episode 2.7), "Report by Exception" (2006, episode 2.9), "Bait (2006, episode 2.10), "Bedfellows" (2007, episode 2.21), "Paradise Lost" (2007, episode 2.23), "Pandemonium: Part 1" (2007, episode 3.1), "Pandemonium: Part 2" (2007, episode 3.2), "Side Angle Slide" (2007, episode 3.11), "The Spear of Destiny" (2009, episode 4.13), "The Last Nazi" (2009, episode 4.14).
