= Sex trade (disambiguation) =

The sex trade consists of businesses which either directly or indirectly provide sex-related products and services.

Sex trade may also refer to:

- Russian Dolls: Sex Trade, a Flemish television programme
- "Sex Trade" (The Unit), a 2008 television episode
