= Cool Breeze =

Cool Breeze may refer to any of the following:

- Cool Breeze (rapper), born 1971
- Cool Breeze (film), 1972 MGM blaxploitation film
- Cool Breeze (real name Roger Williams), a member of Ken Kesey's Merry Pranksters featured in the 1968 Tom Wolfe book The Electric Kool-Aid Acid Test
- Cool Breeze, callsign of fictional character Bob Brown (The Unit)
