= Edge (TV pilot) =

2015 TV film

- Based on: Edge series by George G. Gilman
- Written by: Shane Black; Fred Dekker
- Directed by: Shane Black
- Starring: Max Martini
- Theme music composer: Brian Tyler
- Country of origin: United States
- Original language: English

Production
- Producers: Shane Black; Johnny Dawkins; Fred Dekker; David Greenblatt; Barry Josephson; Tony Mark; Ellen Stafford
- Cinematography: Dante Spinotti
- Editor: Harry B. Miller III
- Running time: 62 minutes
- Production company: Amazon Studios

Original release
- Network: Amazon Video
- Release: November 4, 2015

Edge is a 2015 television pilot produced by Amazon Studios. It is a Western set in Kansas based on the Edge book series by George G. Gilman.

== Premise ==
Josiah Hedges, also known as Edge, is a half-Mexican hired gunslinger who sets out for vengeance after his younger brother is killed by a group of his former comrades in the Union Army. The group is led by Edge's nemesis, Merritt Harknett, a psychotic sadist who delights in inflicting pain on others and who also seeks something in Edge's possession.

== Cast ==
- Max Martini as Edge
- Ryan Kwanten as Harknett
- Yvonne Strahovski as Beth
- Alicja Bachleda as Pilar
- William Sadler as Big Bill
- Beau Knapp as Little Bill
- Robert Bailey, Jr. as Benny
- Noah Segan as Deputy Bean
- Jerry Vahn Knight as Young Josiah Hedges
- Alex Sawunyama as Young Benny
- Nate Warren as Jamie Hedges
- Leo Martini as Young Jamie Hedges
- Christopher Hagen as Preacher
- Dylan Kenin as Deputy Trickett
- Kevin Owen McDonald as Cyrus
- Chad Randall as Graves
- William Paul Brown as Cobb
- Jacob Browne as Benny's Father
- Nathaniel Augustson as Union Guard
- Eva Dolezalova as Annie

== Production ==
Edge was released as a pilot for a potential TV series but was not picked up by Amazon.

== Reception ==
In general, critics appreciated the action and effects of the pilot but were critical of the writing and story.

Robert Lloyd of the Los Angeles Times called the action "well staged" but called the film an uncomfortable combination in which the supposedly realistic brutality "is contradicted by the super-anti-heroic invincibility of its death-dealing central character."

Neil Genzlinger of The New York Times called it "an ultraviolent western that starts out with promise but degenerates into gore for gore's sake." He further wrote that the only reason to produce something so over the top "is to appeal to bloodlust" and that "by the pilot's end, it barely matters who is killing whom or why."

Barry Lowry of Variety.com wrote that "too much of the writing misses the bull's-eye."
