= Dancing Lessons =

Dancing Lessons may refer to:

== Television ==
An episode of the American action-drama television series The Unit.

== Theater ==
A play by American playwright Mark St. Germain.
