= Spectral =

2016 military science fiction action film

- Title card and logo of Spectral
- Directed by: Nic Mathieu
- Screenplay by: George Nolfi
- Story by: Ian Fried; Nic Mathieu
- Produced by: Thomas Tull; Jillian Share
- Starring: James Badge Dale; Max Martini; Emily Mortimer; Clayne Crawford; Bruce Greenwood
- Cinematography: Bojan Bazelli
- Edited by: Jason Ballantine
- Music by: Junkie XL
- Production companies: Legendary Pictures; Universal Pictures; Netflix; Mid Atlantic Films
- Distributed by: Netflix
- Release date: December 9, 2016 (Worldwide)
- Running time: 107 minutes
- Countries: United States; Hungary
- Languages: English; Russian; Romanian; Slovenian
- Budget: $70 million (estimated)

Spectral is a 2016 military science fiction action film co-written and directed by Nic Mathieu. Written with Ian Fried and George Nolfi, the film stars James Badge Dale as DARPA research scientist Mark Clyne, with Max Martini, Emily Mortimer, Clayne Crawford, and Bruce Greenwood in supporting roles.

The film is set in a civil war–ridden Moldova as invisible entities slaughter any living being caught in their path. The film was released worldwide on December 9, 2016 on Netflix. On February 1, 2017, Netflix released a prequel graphic novel of the film called Spectral: Ghosts of War which was made available digitally through the website ComiXology.

== Plot ==
DARPA engineer Mark Clyne is sent to an American military airbase in Chișinău, to investigate the death of Delta Force operator Chris Davis, who is sent there as part of General James Orland's initiative to support the Moldovan government against anti-government insurgency in an ongoing civil war. The military forces involved are equipped with Clyne's latest invention, a line of hyperspectral imaging goggles, which picks up an unknown entity that is invisible to the naked eye and kills almost instantaneously. The signal intelligence ops initially wrote it off as interference, but Clyne believes the sightings to be legitimate, while CIA Case Officer Fran Madison believes the sightings to be local insurgency members wearing an advanced form of active camouflage technology and has orders from her superiors to retrieve any sample of it.

Orland assigns Clyne and Madison to a Delta Force team led by Major Sessions on an extraction mission to locate their missing Utah team at Durlești. There they find Comstock, one of the few survivors of the team, hiding under a bathtub, when a group of entities — who are impervious to firearms and explosives — attack the group. However, as they retreat, their vehicles run over a landmine, killing Comstock and forcing them to take shelter in an abandoned factory inhabited by another surviving Utah team member, Chen, and two Slovene siblings; Sari and Bogdan. Their late father had surrounded the factory with iron filings to deter the entities, known locally as "Aratare", from entering the premises.

After establishing radio contact with the airbase, the team construct IEDs and grenades laced with iron filings and set out to an alternate extraction point on foot as the entities bypass the surrounding filings. Reaching an alternate extraction point at an abandoned plaza, the group barely manages to escape, but not before Bogdan loses his life to the entities.

The group are redirected to a Moldovan-controlled civilian bunker as the airbase was evacuated after being overrun by the entities. Using information gathered from Sari, Clyne deduces the apparitions are made of Bose–Einstein condensate, making them incapable of passing through iron and ceramic materials, which explains Comstock’s initial survival and the entities' difficulty in passing through tank armor plating. Working overnight with Orland and surviving military engineers, he constructs ceramic armored suits and makeshift pulse weapons. The next morning, Clyne, Madison, and the remaining Delta operators head out for the power plant in Masrov, where Clyne deduces it can generate enough electricity to power the condensate and is also where all the entity encounters first started.

While the troops mount an offensive distraction on the roof of the plant, Clyne and Madison descend into a laboratory underneath it. There they discover the former regime's scientists had mass-produced the condensate entities as molecular copies of human test subjects' remains, whose peripheral nervous systems were hooked up to a central machine that keeps the copies alive. When the civil war broke out, the facility was damaged and some of the entities escaped, killing everyone inside and leading to a current situation. With the battle above threatening to release the remaining condensates, Clyne manages to activate the failsafe that deactivates them. He also unplugs the human remains from the machine, finally letting them die in peace.

With the apparitions gone, the U.S. and allied Moldovan military resume their work of taking control of the city from the insurgents while the DoD considers reverse engineering the condensate machine for wartime purposes. Clyne bids goodbye to Orland, Sari, and Madison, and is airlifted back home.

== Cast ==
- James Badge Dale as Mark Clyne, a DARPA scientist
- Emily Mortimer as Fran Madison, a CIA officer who runs Delta Force operations in Moldova's war-torn capital
- Max Martini as Major Sessions, the leader of the Delta Force team
- Bruce Greenwood as General James Orland, the leader of U.S. Army troops deployed to fight in the Moldovan War
- Clayne Crawford as SGT Toll
- Gonzalo Menendez as CPT Cabrera
- Ursula Parker as Sari
- Louis Ozawa Changchien as SGT Chen
- Cory Hardrict as Alessio
- Aaron Serban as Bogdan
- Dylan Smith as Talbot
- Jimmy Akingbola as McFadden
- Ryan Robbins as SGT Comstock
- Stephen Root as Dr. Mindala
- Philip Bulcock as SGT Davis
- Royce Pierreson as Diaz
- Declan Hannigan as Hayden
- Mark O'Neal as Lewis
- Michael Bodie as Efrem
- Jonny Hughes (Biscuits) as Gormless Brit Tourist
- Rich Moore (Cupcakes) as Lazar Mattheus

== Production ==
During the summer of 2014, Legendary Pictures and Universal Pictures announced that commercials director Nic Mathieu would make his feature debut directing Fried's screenplay for the supernatural action film Spectral which would star James Badge Dale, Max Martini, Bruce Greenwood and Emily Mortimer. Described as a supernatural Black Hawk Down, Spectral centers on a special-ops team dispatched to fight supernatural beings who have taken over a European city.

Ian Fried wrote the original script, which was re-written by Mathieu, Jamie Moss, John Gatins and George Nolfi, who received sole screenwriting credit, with Mathieu and Fried receiving story credit.

=== Principal photography ===
Principal photography began on August 7, 2014. Shooting started on August 28, 2014 in various streets and buildings in Budapest, Hungary, relying extensively on practical effects and locations for an authentic, gritty atmosphere. Locations included Buda Castle, which served as the location of the landing zone scene, and Gellért Hill. Filming was completed in August 2015. Peter Jackson’s Weta Workshop produced the futuristic weapons and Weta Digital created the visual effects for the film. Universal Pictures anticipated a release in August 2016 but decided against this and transferred the rights to Netflix which released it on December 9, 2016.

== Release ==
Initially, Universal Pictures was going to distribute the film, setting an August 12, 2016 release date for the film. In June 2016, the film was pulled from the schedule. Netflix later acquired distribution rights to the film and released the film worldwide on December 9, 2016.

On February 1, 2017, Netflix released a prequel comic of the movie called Spectral: Ghosts of War made available digitally through the website ComiXology.

=== Critical reception ===
Rotten Tomatoes gives the film an approval rating of 78% based on 9 reviews, with an average rating of 5.70/10.

Writing for The Verge, Tasha Robinson summarises "It’s understandable that Netflix jumped at the chance to grab what was intended as a big-screen, large-scale thriller. But Spectral winds up feeling like a much smaller film, like something that was intended for a casual streaming experience all along."
