= Clayne Crawford =

American actor (born 1978)

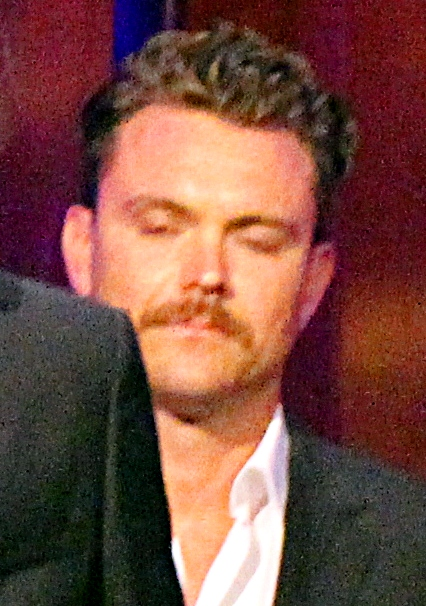
- Crawford with the cast and crew of Rectify in May 2015
- Born: William Joseph Crawford; April 20, 1978 (age 48); Clay, Alabama, U.S.
- Occupation: Actor
- Years active: 1997–present

Joseph "Clayne" Crawford (born April 20, 1978) is an American actor. He is best known for his roles as Martin Riggs on the Fox series Lethal Weapon (2016–2018) and Teddy Talbot on the SundanceTV series Rectify (2013–2016), the latter earning him a nomination for the Critics' Choice Television Award for Best Supporting Actor in a Drama Series. He has also had supporting roles in the films A Walk to Remember (2002), Swimfan (2002), A Love Song for Bobby Long (2004), The Great Raid (2005), and Wristcutters: A Love Story (2006). He began the Clayne Crawford Foundation to raise awareness and funds for non-profits that empower veterans, children and women of his home state, Alabama.

== Early life ==
Joseph Crawford was born in Clay, Alabama, on April 20, 1978, the son of Lennie Crawford and Brian Crawford. He graduated from Hewitt-Trussville High School, where he was on the football and wrestling teams.

== Career ==
In 1996, Crawford moved to Los Angeles to look for acting work. He took construction jobs to support himself while appearing in small theaters. In 2000, to distinguish himself from others with a similar name, he stopped using the name "Joey Crawford" and began appearing with the name "Clayne Crawford". He created his new first name by taking the name of his hometown (Clay, Alabama) and combining it with the word "clan" in honor of an ancestor. He had a recurring role in the first season of Jericho as Mitchell "Mitch" Cafferty. In 2008, he appeared on Life in the episode "Evil ... and His Brother Ziggy". Crawford was the protagonist in the 2010 straight-to-DVD prequel to Smokin' Aces, Smokin' Aces 2: Assassins' Ball. In 2010, he had a recurring role in the eighth season of 24 as Kevin Wade, a young, mysterious man. He also appeared in the first and second season of the A&E series The Glades.

Crawford played the role of Ted "Teddy" Talbot Jr. in the first SundanceTV original series, Rectify, which was aired for four seasons from 2013 to 2016. The series, exploring a man who is released from prison after 19 years on death row after DNA evidence appears to support his innocence, also looks at the effects on his family and town. It received critical praise and won a Peabody Award in 2014, also receiving notice for its treatment of issues in criminal justice. In 2015, Crawford played the role of Cade LaSalle, older brother to Christopher LaSalle on NCIS: New Orleans.

Beginning in 2016, Crawford portrayed Martin Riggs in the Fox television reboot Lethal Weapon. Crawford was fired after two seasons, in May 2018, amid reports of conflicts between cast and crew on the show's set, and replaced with a new character played by Seann William Scott.

His career also includes different projects aimed at streaming services, such as a supporting actor role in Netflix original film Spectral, and the role of protagonist in one of the episodes of Hulu's anthology series Into the Dark. In 2026, Crawford starred in season 2 of Showtime's The Agency as the primary antagonist.

From 2019 to present, Crawford has started focusing mostly on independent filmmaking, starring in acclaimed drama films The Killing of Two Lovers and The Integrity of Joseph Chambers, action movie The Channel, and thriller films Finestkind and The King Tide.

== Filmography ==
=== Film ===
Year	Title	Role	Notes
2001	One Blood Planet	Cady	
2002	A Walk to Remember	Dean	
2002	Swimfan	Josh	
2004	A Love Song for Bobby Long	Lee	
2004	Evil Remains	Tyler	Direct-to-video
2005	The Great Raid	PFC Aldridge	
2005	Trust	Jim	Short film
2006	Steel City	Ben Lee	
2006	Wristcutters: A Love Story	Jim	
2006	False Prophets	Wade Carpenter	
2006	F8	Driver	Short film
2006	Unknown	Detective Anderson	
2006	Feel	Jeremy	
2007	7-10 Split	Mike	
2007	Walk the Talk	Reed	
2007	God's Beach	Adam	Short film
2007	On the Doll	Wes	
2007	X's and O's	Simon	
2009	The Donner Party	William Eddy	
2010	The Perfect Host	John Taylor	
2010	Baby	Jonas Carter	
2010	Kingshighway	Billy Jones	
2010	Smokin' Aces 2: Assassins' Ball	Agent Baker	Direct-to-video
2011	Pox	Julius	
2012	The Baytown Outlaws	Brick Oodie	
2012	The Truth in Being Right	Carl Weintraub	Short film
2013	N.Y.C. Underground	Siman	Direct-to-video
2014	The Lachrymist	The Disc Jockey of 94.9 KLAS (voice, as William Westhoven)	Short film
2015	A Fighting Season	Mason	
2015	Convergence	Ben	
2016	Warrior Road	Charlie	
2016	Spectral	Sergeant Toll	
2017	Above Ground	Thad	
2018	Tinker!	Grady Lee Jr.	
2020	The Killing of Two Lovers	David	
2022	The Integrity of Joseph Chambers	Joe	
2023	The Channel	Jamie Sheridan	
2023	The King Tide	Bobby	
2023	Finestkind	Pete Weeks	
2023	Drawn	Wolcott	Short film; also executive producer
2023	You & I	Joseph	Also Producer
2025	Stone Creek	Karl Harding	

=== Television ===
Year	Title	Role	Notes
1997	Buffy the Vampire Slayer	Rodney Munson	Episode: "Inca Mummy Girl" (as Joey Crawford)
2001	CSI: Crime Scene Investigation	Henry McFadden	Episode: "Chaos Theory"
2001–02	Roswell	Billy Darden	2 episodes
2003	CSI: Miami	Chaz	Episode: "Freaks and Tweaks"
2006	Thief	Izzy	Episode: "Pilot"
2006–07	Jericho	Mitchell Cafferty	5 episodes
2007	The Barnes Brothers	Jerry Barnes	Television film
2007	Women's Murder Club	Dale Peterson	Episode: "Maybe Baby"
2008	Gemini Division	Sampson	2 episodes
2008	Life	Eval	Episode: "Evil... and His Brother Ziggy"
2009–12	Leverage	Mr. Quinn	2 episodes
2009	CSI: Crime Scene Investigation	Tommy Ruby	Episode: "Miscarriage of Justice"
2009	Cold Case	Darren Malloy '76	Episode: "Jackels"
2009	Dark Blue	Jack Walsh	Episode: "K-Town"
2009	Criminal Minds	C. Vincent	Episode: "Hopeless"
2010	Burn Notice	Ryan Johnson	Episode: "A Dark Road"
2010	24	Kevin Wade	9 episodes
2010	Law & Order: Criminal Intent	Jeremy Parks	Episode: "Lost Children of the Blood"
2010–11	The Glades	Ray Cargill	7 episodes
2010	All Signs of Death	Chev	Television film
2011	CSI: NY	Wes Dillon	Episode: "Exit Strategy"
2011	Memphis Beat	Derek Simon	Episode: "Lost"
2012	Justified	Lance	3 episodes
2013–16	Rectify	Ted "Teddy" Talbot Jr.	30 episodes Nominated — Critics' Choice Television Award for Best Supporting Actor in a Drama Series
2013	Graceland	Donnie Banks	2 episodes
2014	Rogue	Danny "Cheat" Chetowski	5 episodes
2015	NCIS: New Orleans	Cade LaSalle	3 episodes
2016–18	Lethal Weapon	Martin Riggs	Main cast (seasons 1–2, 41 episodes); Also director: "Jessie's Girl"
2019	Into the Dark	Nathan	Episode: "They Come Knocking"
2025	Chad Powers	Coach Dobbs	8 episodes
2026–present	The Agency	Vernon Crawford	9 episodes

== Awards ==
2016 Critics' Choice Television Award for Best Supporting Actor in a Drama Series (nominated)
