= Sgt. Will Gardner =

- Theatrical release poster
- Directed by: Max Martini
- Written by: Max Martini
- Produced by: Michael Hagerty; Matthew Hanson; Tanya Hill; Max Martini
- Starring: Max Martini; Omari Hardwick; Dermot Mulroney; Gary Sinise; Robert Patrick
- Cinematography: Corey Weintraub
- Edited by: Tim Silano
- Production company: Mona Vista Productions
- Distributed by: Cinedigm Entertainment Group
- Release date: January 11, 2019 (USA)
- Running time: 124 minutes
- Country: United States
- Language: English

Sgt. Will Gardner is an American film directed and written by Max Martini. The film stars Martini, Omari Hardwick, Dermot Mulroney, Gary Sinise, and Robert Patrick, telling the story of a disabled Iraq War veteran, Will Gardner, who is suffering from traumatic brain injury (TBI) and posttraumatic stress disorder (PTSD) he sustained while in combat. After a series of setbacks, he goes on a cross-country motorcycle journey to reassemble his life and his family.

== Cast ==
- Max Martini as Will Gardner
- Dermot Mulroney as Buddy
- Robert Patrick as Tony
- Lily Rabe as Mary Anne Mackey
- Luis Bordonad as Charlie Burrows
- Gary Sinise as Larry
- Omari Hardwick as Samuel 'Top' Gallegos
- JoBeth Williams as Sherry
- Stuart Margolin as Mr. Glenn
- Elisabeth Röhm as Kimmy

== Production ==
Martini and Michael Hagerty produced the film under Mona Vista Productions. Martini has pledged 30% of the film's proceeds to three charities that support veterans suffering from TBI, PTSD, and veteran homelessness.

== Reception ==
On the review aggregator website Rotten Tomatoes, 22% of 9 critics' reviews are positive, with an average rating of 5.1/10. Metacritic, which uses a weighted average, assigned the film a score of 30 out of 100, based on 4 critics, indicating "generally unfavorable" reviews.
