= Another Day (2001 film) =

2001 film by Jeffrey Reiner

- Written by: Don MacLeod; Helen Frost
- Directed by: Jeffrey Reiner
- Starring: Shannen Doherty; Julian McMahon; Max Martini
- Countries of origin: Canada; United States
- Original language: English

Production
- Producers: Eric Norlen; Jean Desormeaux
- Cinematography: Gavin Smith
- Running time: 98 minutes

Original release
- Release: December 4, 2001

Another Day is a 2001 American-Canadian romantic drama film directed by Jeffrey Reiner and starring Shannen Doherty, Julian McMahon, and Max Martini. It was written by Don MacLeod and Helen Frost. It was produced by Eric Norlen and Jean Desormeaux, and released as a television film. It received 53% on Rotten Tomatoes.

== Plot ==
Kate has been working a job she doesn't like and saving up to go to medical school. She discovers she's pregnant. Her boyfriend is of good conduct, but she and her boyfriend Paul disagree with her decision not to settle down. She drives all day to David's place, her best friend since childhood. She learns the next day that Paul has died in a factory fire. She reaches the factory. It appears as though Paul ought not have been at the factory and that his death appears to be suicide. Years later Kate has moved on with her life and her new boyfriend is David. She has chosen to raise the child who has grown to be a four-year-old whom she has named Meghan after her mother. David talks about conversations he's had with her that Kate doesn't remember. Kate gets admission to an accounting school. David asks her why she's settled for accounting when she wanted to go to medical school. They have a minor argument in which she accuses David of not doing much with his life either. Meghan plays too close to the river and is swept away by the river current. David jumps into the gushing current to save her. Kate follows and jumps in too. Kate gets separated.

Kate is then swept ashore and saved by the river patrol police. She awakens to discover that she has gone back in time to before Paul's accident. She slowly gets used to the time when David is still her friend and Paul is her boyfriend. She extracts a promise from Paul to never go near the factory and to marry her soon. Paul leaves early the next morning in his river boat to go to his retreat to have time to himself to think it over. David and Kate get worried and go off in search of him. They do not find him, but during the excursion she learns that David wanted to make it big by selling art in the big city. She discovers David has feelings for her when he says he's not going to miss anything if he dies, but he's terrified of what he misses if he lives. On the way she asks to be dropped at the factory. David returns home, and tells a frantic Paul she's at the factory. Paul goes to get her. At the factory Kate discovers the fire was started by an acquaintance who works for security at the factory on account of negligence by lighting a cigarette on premises. She gets hurt as the fire intensifies with explosions. Paul arrives, however he gets fatally hurt by shrapnel as more blasts occur. Kate tries to drag Paul, but eventually has to save her own life. She sees her other self arrive from the factory windows. Her memory fades and the next thing she knows is that she's in the water.

Kate is again swept ashore. The river patrol police find her. She awakens and knows that she is back in her own time and understands all. David confirms that Meghan is safe. She confronts the acquaintance, and he asks her why she didn't tell anyone. Kate has now learned that one cannot change the past but one can decide how to live for the future and moves on to living happy with David and Meghan.

== Cast ==
- Shannen Doherty as Kate
- Julian McMahon as David
- Max Martini as Paul
- Courtney Kidd as Meghan
- David Ferry as Ray
- Kristina Nicoll as Gabby
- Chad Bruce as Ian

== Release dates ==
US	4 December 2001	
Greece	30 September 2003	(DVD premiere)
UK	8 February 2005	
Italy	20 April 2006	
Sweden	19 March 2010	
