= The Integrity of Joseph Chambers =

- Film poster
- Directed by: Robert Machoian
- Written by: Robert Machoian
- Produced by: Clayne Crawford; Kiki Crawford
- Starring: Clayne Crawford
- Cinematography: Oscar Ignacio Jiménez
- Edited by: Yvette M. Amirian
- Music by: William Ryan Fritch
- Production companies: Back40 Pictures; 433; Victorhouse Films
- Distributed by: Gravitas Ventures
- Release date: June 9, 2022 (Tribeca)
- Running time: 96 minutes
- Country: United States
- Language: English

The Integrity of Joseph Chambers is a 2022 American drama film written and directed by Robert Machoian and starring Clayne Crawford.

== Plot ==
Joe, an insurance salesman, decides to go into the woods alone to hunt deer. He borrows his friend Doug's pickup truck and drives to the forest. Once there, he wanders about until he comes across a deer in the distance. He chases the animal, but loses sight of it. A noise startles him and he shoots his rifle, finding that the bullet struck another man (credited as Lone Wolf) in the chest, seemingly killing him.

Horrified, Joe runs back to the pickup truck and sobs. He returns to the spot and digs a grave in which to bury the dead body. Lone Wolf, however, turns out to be alive, and flees in a panic. Joe chases after him, apologizing for shooting him and saying that he must be brought to a hospital. Lone Wolf refuses. Joe and Lone Wolf have a conversation in which Joe explains that he went deer hunting in order to be better prepared to look after his family. Lone Wolf is revealed to have been living in the woods. Lone Wolf insults Joe's masculinity, calls Joe a "phony," and says that there's "no point" in trying to survive. Lone Wolf dies, and Joe carries his corpse to the grave and buries it, finding a photograph of what appears to be Lone Wolf's wife and children in the process.

Joe then walks over to a stream and fantasizes about returning home to his wife and children and pretending that everything is normal. He then digs up Lone Wolf's corpse, puts it in the back of the pickup truck, drives back into town, and enters a police station, visibly shaken and in stunned silence. The Police Chief, after seeing the corpse in the truck, questions Joe about what happened, and Joe considers what to say before the screen cuts to black.

== Cast ==
- Clayne Crawford as Joe
- Jordana Brewster as Tess
- Michael Raymond-James as Lone Wolf
- Jeffrey Dean Morgan as Police Chief
- Carl Kennedy as Doug
- Colt Crawford as Son
- Hix Crawford as Son
- Charline St. Charles as Francine

== Production ==
Production began in Alabama in December 2020.

== Release ==
The film premiered in June 2022 at the Tribeca Film Festival.

== Reception ==
On the review aggregator website Rotten Tomatoes, 91% of 32 critics' reviews are positive. The website's consensus reads: "An absorbing and intelligent character piece, The Integrity of Joseph Chambers is further elevated by Clayne Crawford's outstanding performance." Metacritic, which uses a weighted average, assigned the film a score of 66 out of 100, based on 7 critics, indicating "generally favorable" reviews.

David Rooney of The Hollywood Reporter gave the film a positive review, calling it "Thin but compelling."

Piers Marchant of the Arkansas Democrat-Gazette also gave the film a positive review and wrote, “Not everything holds together exactly, storywise, but there remains more than enough filmmaking flair, and another strong, committed performance from Crawford, to anchor it down.”
