= The Channel (film) =

- Theatrical release poster
- Directed by: William Kaufman
- Written by: William Kaufman
- Story by: Paul Reichelt
- Produced by: Andrew Lewis; Isaac Lewis; Christian Sosa; Jon Wroblewski
- Starring: Clayne Crawford; Max Martini; Juliene Joyner; Jaren Mitchell; Nicoye Banks
- Cinematography: Mark Rutledge
- Edited by: Travis Medina
- Music by: John Roome
- Production companies: Appalachian Film; Denton Film.; Roosevelt Film Lab; TBD Post
- Distributed by: Brainstorm Media
- Release date: July 14, 2023
- Running time: 95 minutes
- Country: United States
- Language: English

The Channel is a 2023 American heist action-thriller film directed by and written by William Kaufman, about a desperate bank robber who, along with his brothers and accomplices, tries to escape New Orleans to evade FBI agents. The starring cast includes Clayne Crawford, Max Martini, Juliet Joyner, Jalen Mitchell and Nicoye Banks.

The film was a limited release and VOD release in the United States on July 14, 2023. The film received mixed reviews from critics and audiences.

== Plot ==
Jamie awakens with a start after a nightmare from his time as a United States Marine. He says goodbye to his daughter and is picked up by a van. Inside the van, Mic and three other men are putting on masks and body armour, and checking their firearms. The van arrives at its destination, which turns out to be a branch of the First National Bank. The gang assault the branch manager, who reveals the code to the bank's vault. The gang collects $1.5 million and tries to make their getaway, which is foiled by the New Orleans Police Department (NOPD) and SWAT. In the shootout, two members of the gang and their getaway driver are killed along with a number of police officers and SWAT team members. Jamie and Mic manage to escape and get away with Flea, the fifth member of the gang, who is severely injured.

Special Agent Frank Ross arrives at the bank branch, where he is briefed by Special Agent Mike Hayes and NOPD officers. Ross also briefly interviews some of the bank's staff. Meanwhile, Jamie, Mic and Flea go to Bill's house, who had agreed to launder the money. Mic suspects Bill tipped off NOPD but Bill blames Smalls, who was arrested by NOPD on the day prior to the robbery. Bill's contact is unable to launder the money because of the gang had killed police officers but suggests Nussy might be able to launder the money for a higher commission. Jamie and Mic ask Bill to set up a meeting and then take Flea to Clarence, an army buddy with medical training. Unknown to Jamie, Mic pays Clarence to kill Flea after learning about the severity of his injuries. Clarence lies to Jamie and says he'll get Flea to a hospital.

Jamie and Mic, along with Ava (Jamie's partner) agrees to meet Brill (Nussy's brother) to exchange the stolen money for laundered money. Mic's short temper gets the better of him and starts a shootout that ends with the death of Brill and his crew. Meanwhile Special Agents Ross and Hayes interview Smalls, who helps them to identify Jamie and Mic.

Jamie and Mic return to Bill's apartment to plan their escape, only to be kidnapped by Nussy and his crew. Jamie and Mic wake up to find themselves in the basement of Nussy's club, who threatens to kill Jamie, Mic and Ava in a tub of sulphuric acid as revenge for killing Brill. A fight ensues during which Jamie and Mic break free, kill Nussy and his crew and escape from the club. Once on the street, Mic and Jamie (joined by Ava) separate to make it harder for police to find them.

A police car happens to find Jamie and Ava but Mic kills the police officers and frees them. Mic is then chased through a New Orleans suburb by Special Agents Ross and Hayes, which ends with Hayes shooting Mic dead. Before he dies, Mic tells Hayes that Jamie is dead. Jamie and Ava catch a tram where they farewell each other, knowing that they will one day meet again. In the basement of Nussy's club, Hayes finds Jamie's pendant in the sulphuric acid, leading him to conclude that Mic was telling the truth and he is indeed dead.

A couple of days later, Special Agent Ross visits Ava at home to find out whether she knows where Jamie is. Ava's responses confirm Ross' suspicions that Jamie is dead and he decides not to prosecute Ava for her role in the robbery so Ava is able to take care of the daughter she had with Jamie.

Some years later, Jamie, Ava and their daughter meet again on the shores of a lake in Bolivia, as they promised each other on that fateful night.

== Cast ==
- Clayne Crawford as Jamie Sheridan
- Max Martini as Mic Sheridan
- Juliene Joyner as Ava Rishoto
- Nicoye Banks as Special Agent Frank Ross
- E.K. Spila as Special Agent Mike Hayes
- Jaren Mitchell as Nicotra
- Lucky Johnson as Nussy
- Michael Thomas as Stitches
- David Opegbemi as Brill Waynes
- Linds Edwards as Flea
- Mike Lobo Daniel as Vee
- Xander Gòmez as Oz
- Todd Jenkins as Clarence
- Gary Cairns as Smalls
- Paul Rae as Bill

== Production ==
This film was filmed in New Orleans, Louisiana in 2021.

== Release ==
In February 2022, Screen International reported that Grandave International was handling worldwide distribution sales rights for the film. On September 10, 2022, according to the Deadline Hollywood website, Brainstorm Media obtained the North American distribution rights of the film. It was planned to have a limited release and VOD release in April 2023. The film was finally released on July 14, 2023.

The Channel was a released in DVD and Blu-ray formats on October 10, 2023.
