= Ian Fried (screenwriter) =

American screenwriter (born 1986)

- Born: 1986 (age 39–40); Omaha, Nebraska, U.S.
- Education: USC School of Cinematic Arts
- Occupation: Screenwriter
- Years active: c. 2010s–present

Ian Fried (born 1986) is an American screenwriter. He studied filmmaking at the USC School of Cinematic Arts.

== Early life and education ==
Fried was born in 1986 in Omaha, Nebraska where he graduated from Westside High School.

He attended USC School of Cinematic Arts.

== Film career ==
Shortly after graduating, Fried's first screenplay, a fairy tale mash-up entitled The Ever After Murders was featured on Franklin Leonard's compendium of 2010's best unproduced screenplays, the Black List.

In late 2011, Fried's second screenplay Gaslight was also featured on the Black List. During the same month, Fried was featured on The Tracking Board's "best unproduced screenplay" roster, The Hit List. Shortly thereafter, Fried sold his first feature film pitch Spectral which was picked up by Legendary Pictures where it is currently in development for a tentative 2015 release. In February 2014, actor James Badge Dale was cast in the lead.

Following the surprise success of its horror movie The Woman in Black (2012 film), Exclusive Media’s genre arm Hammer Films purchased Fried's Gothic Horror Thriller, Gaslight. In Gaslight, Jack the Ripper, secretly imprisoned in a London insane asylum, is called upon to help Scotland Yard solve a series of murders that share the iconic death brand: dual puncture wounds to the neck.

In late 2013, Fried teamed with producer John Davis and Davis Entertainment (Chronicle) to sell his top-secret science fiction pitch Prism to Paramount Pictures.

During the summer of 2014, Legendary Pictures and Universal Pictures announced that commercials director Nic Mathieu would make his feature debut directing Fried's screenplay for the supernatural action movie Spectral which will star James Badge Dale, Max Martini, Bruce Greenwood and Emily Mortimer. Described as a supernatural Black Hawk Down, Spectral centers on a Special Ops team dispatched to fight supernatural beings who have taken over a European city.

In the fall of 2014, Fried partnered with Roy Lee’s Vertigo Entertainment to set up the feature film project Pentacle at Lionsgate. The story is described as a dark, Amblin-style thriller set in the world of magic.
