= Terry Harknett =

British author (born 1936)

- Born: 14 December 1936; Essex, England, United Kingdom
- Died: 23 January 2019 (aged 82); Dorchester
- Occupation: Writer
- Spouse: Jane Harman
- Writing career
- Language: English
- Genres: Western, crime
- Notable work: Edge western series

Terry Harknett (11 December 1936 - 23 January 2019) was a British author. He was author of almost 200 books, mostly pulp novels in the western and crime genres. He wrote under an array of pseudonyms, including George G. Gilman, Joseph Hedges, William M. James, Charles R. Pike, Thomas H. Stone, Frank Chandler, Jane Harman, Alex Peters, William Pine, William Terry, James Russell and David Ford. On at least one occasion he wrote as a ghostwriter for Peter Haining (for novel The Hero). Some bibliographies, e.g. Fantastic Fiction, list Adam Hardy as one of Harknett's pseudonyms, in fact a nom de plume of Kenneth Bulmer. This is an error resulting from incorrect copyright information printed in one of the Edge westerns.

Harknett wrote a number of fiction series including:

- Steve Wayne (9 books under his own name published between 1962 and 1971 by Robert Hale and Hammond)
- Crown (3 books under his own name)
- Edge (61 books as George G. Gilman)
- Adam Steele (49 books as George G. Gilman)
- Edge Meets Adam Steele (3 books as George G. Gilman)
- The Undertaker (6 books as George G. Gilman)
- The Revenger (12 books as Joseph Hedges)
- Apache (27 books as William M. James)
- Jubal Cade (3 books as Charles R. Pike)
- Chester Fortune (5 books as Thomas H. Stone)

Harknett's authorship of the Edge, Steele, Jubal Cade and Apache series, as well as his novelisation of the film A Fistful of Dollars (under the pseudonym Frank Chandler, Tandem Books [1972]) earned him the description of 'One of the authors of "Blood and Soil" Western fiction'.

Harknett's westerns have been identified as an influence by authors including Robert J. Randisi and Peter Brandvold.

George G. Gilman is one pseudonym, or pen name, of Terry Harknett. Under that name Harknett wrote three series of Western books: Edge, which his US publisher would brand "The Most Violent Westerns in Print", Adam Steele (this character and Edge appeared together in three books) and The Undertaker. The Gilman books were known for their sardonic and sarcastic humor and for their very violent content.

In 2015 Amazon Studios aired a TV pilot titled Edge based on the book series of the same name, adapted by Shane Black and Fred Dekker and directed by Shane Black.
