= Eva Vik =

Czech screenwriter and director

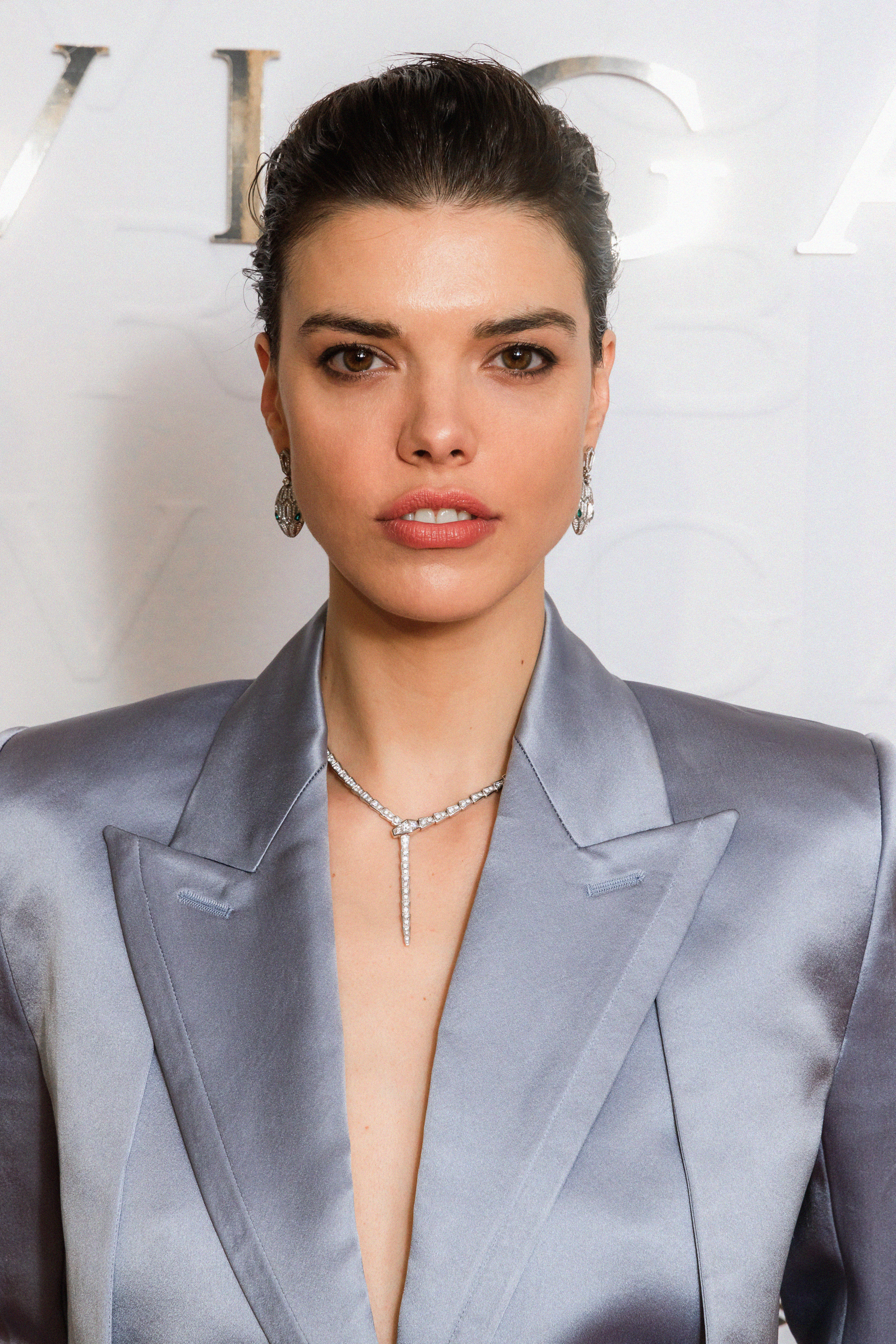
- EVA VIK at Serpentine Premiere in (2023)
- Born: May 5, 1991 (age 35); Prague, Czechoslovakia
- Education: Royal Academy of Dramatic Art
- Occupations: Film director; Film producer; screenwriter
- Years active: 2017–present
- Works: Full list
- Awards: Full list

Eva Vik (born Eva Doležalová May 5, 1991) is a Czech filmmaker, film director, screenwriter, and producer, represented by Ridley Scott Creative Group worldwide. She is known for films such as Serpentine (2023), Raven (2022) and Carte Blanche (2019). She has been recognized with numerous film awards for her rapidly rising career including the Breakout Director's Award at the Hollywood Film Festival, the Audience Award and the Best Genre Film Award at the Mammoth Film Festival, and Best Director at HollyShorts Film Festival. Eva Vik's short film Serpentine (2023) has been nominated at the Tribeca Film Festival for the X Award and has over 2 million views on Nowness. Moreover, Eva Vik was awarded at Centre Pompidou for her Transformational Trilogy Sounds of Sun, Somnio, Samice in 2019. In 2021, Forbes magazine ranked Eva Vik among the 30 most influential people under 30.

== Career ==
In 2017, Eva Vik moved to Los Angeles to pursue a career as a screenwriter and director and made her first short film called Sound of Sun starring Sean Penn and Suki Waterhouse.

Several other short films followed, including: Carte Blanche with Dylan Sprouse, Suki Waterhouse, and Jack Kilmer who won the Audience Award at the Mammoth Film Festival in 2019 and a Breakout Director Award at the Hollywood Film Festival in 2020. And Maestro, with Clara McGregor and Karel Dobrý, which awarded her the Best Director Award and the Grand Jury Prize at the Independent Shorts Awards in 2021.

In 2022 and 2023, Eva Vik wrote and directed two body-horror science fiction works: Serpentine featuring Barbara Palvin, Luke Brandon Field, and Soo Joo Park, which earned her a Premiere at the Tribeca Festival, a nomination for the Tribeca X Award, and the awards for Best Genre Short Film at the Mammoth Film Festival and HollyShorts Film Festival. Vik's short film Raven was released by Vogue magazine and awarded at Academy Awards-qualifying HollyShorts Film Festival in 2022.

Eva Vik directed two projects in collaboration with Bulgari, Serpentine, a short film starring Barbara Palvin, and a Bulgari Omnia campaign starring Cailee Spaeny.

== Personal life ==
In 2023, she declared that she would henceforth carry the maiden name, Vik, honoring her maternal grandmother. She expressed her intention to move away from the patronymic tradition, choosing instead to adopt the surname of a strong, self-made woman who had profoundly influenced her life.

== Filmography ==
Year	Film	Credited as			Notes	Distributor
Year	Film	Director	Writer	Producer	Notes	Distributor
2016	Sound of Sun	Yes	Yes	Yes	Short Film, starring Suki Waterhouse & Sean Penn	Centre Pompidou & Nowness
2017	Somnio	Yes	Yes	Yes	Short Film, starring Syrie Moskowitz	Centre Pompidou
2018	Good Looking by Suki Waterhouse	Yes	Yes	Yes	Music Video, starring Jordan Barrett & Suki Waterhouse	Vevo
2018	Les Inconnus: Escape	Yes	Yes	Yes	Video & Commercial, starring Jade Weber, Katty Ukhanova, Lauren Taylor	Vogue
2019	Butcher Boy	Yes	Yes	Yes	Short film, starring Jack Kilmer & Camille Rowe	Dazed
2019	Carte Blanche	Yes	Yes	Yes	Short film, starring Dylan Sprouse, Jack Kilmer, Suki Waterhouse, Johnny Whitworth	Amazon Prime Video
2019	Samice	Yes	Yes	Yes	Short film, starring Rainey Qualley, Ray Nicholson, Emily Labowe	Centre Pompidou
2020	Maestro	Yes	Yes	Yes	Short film, starring Karel Dobrý, Clara McGregor, Lucky Blue Smith, Annica Lilljeblad	Amazon Prime Video
2021	Anima Us	Yes	Yes	Yes	Short film, starring Inja Zalta & Dave Davis	Dazed
2022	Raven	Yes	Yes	Yes	Short film, starring Stanislav Majer, Barbora Podzimková, Hana Vagnerová, Adam Vacula	Vogue
2022	Oblivion	Yes	Yes	Yes	Music video, starring Remington Leith, Emerson Barrettt, Sebastian Danzig	Vevo
2022	Fletcher: Better Version	Yes	Yes	Yes	Music video, starring Ava Capri, Gavin Leatherwood, Fletcher	Vevo
2022	Broken	Yes	Yes	Yes	Music video, starring Inja Zalta, Remington Leith, Emerson Barrett	Vevo
2023	Serpentine	Yes	Yes	Yes	Short film, starring Barbara Palvin, Luke Brandon Field, Soo Joo Park	Nowness
2023	Bulgari Omnia	Yes	Yes	Yes	Short film, starring Cailee Spaeny	TVC

== Awards and recognition ==
=== Awards ===
Year	Nominated work	Category	Awarded by
2019	Carte Blanche	Audience Award	Mammoth Film Festival
2020	Carte Blanche	Breakout Director Award	Capri Hollywood Film Festival
2020	Maestro	Jury Prize Best Director	Independent Shorts Awards
2020	Maestro	Jury Prize for Outstanding Achievement	Independent Shorts Awards
2020	Maestro	Platinum Award Winner for Best Drama Short	Independent Shorts Awards
2020	Maestro	Best Women Short	Cyrus Film Festival
2022	Serpentine	Finalist	Tribeca Film Festival for the X Award
2022	Serpentine	Best Genre Film	Mammoth Film Festival

=== Recognitions ===
Year	Recognition	Category
2019	Award for Transformational Trilogy: Sound of Sun, Somnio, and Samice screened at the Centre Pompidou Foundation, Paris	Film/Arts
