= First Responders (The Unit) =

- The Unit episode
- Episode no.: Season 1 Episode 1
- Directed by: Davis Guggenheim
- Written by: David Mamet
- Original air date: March 7, 2006

Guest appearances
- Michael O'Neill as Ron Cheals; Mary B. McCann as Ruthie Cheals (credit as Mary McCann); Matt Malloy as Dr. Farris; Valerie Landsburg as Marge; Adam Lieberman as FBI Man; Brian Palermo as National Guard Commander

Episode chronology
← Previous —	Next → "Stress"
- The Unit (season 1)

"First Responders" is the pilot episode of the American drama series The Unit. It originally aired on CBS on March 7, 2006.

== Plot ==
The episode opens with The Unit assault team leader Jonas Blane and teammates Mack Gerhardt, Charles Grey and Hector Williams as they complete a mission involving destroying a factory in Afghanistan. At the end of the opening segment, the group escapes. Blane brings Bob Brown, the newest member of the unit, to meet Ron Cheals, a former member of the unit. Jonas describes Cheals as having gone from being "the best shot in the unit to the best gunsmith in the world." It is implied that Cheals' injury, as evidenced by his use of a wheelchair, was the reason for the end of his service with the Unit. At Blane's request, Cheals gives Brown a suppressed M2K handgun. While they are meeting with Cheals, a TV news report comes on, indicating that a business jet has been hijacked by terrorists in Idaho. Cheals supplies Blane and Brown with weapons and equipment. The team, minus Gerhardt, who is on another assignment, deploy for the operation.

While watching footage of National Guardsmen approaching the plane and subsequently being killed, Jonas notices that although the Guardsmen approach the plane from an angle such that no-one on the plane should be able to see them, the terrorists are nonetheless alerted to their presence. He concludes that the terrorist have a spotter, watching the scene from a hidden location in the nearby woods, and informing the terrorists when someone approaches. He sends Brown in to neutralize the spotter, which Brown does successfully.

Jonas and the team secure the area and breach the plane. Blane kills all the hostiles on board and detaches the bomb detonator. The team returns home and Bob discovers that his wife Kim Brown (who was adjusting to the shock of learning that her husband is part of the team trying to rescue the airline hostages through part of the episode) is pregnant with his second child. Due to the effects of combat stress, Jonas accidentally discharges his weapon in his home. It is revealed that Tiffany Gerhardt, Mack's wife, is having an affair with the Unit's commanding officer, Colonel Tom Ryan.

== Production ==
The program was created by David Mamet to feature both the domestic lives of the team members and their missions abroad, in addition to the effects their careers have on their home lives, wives, and girlfriends. It premiered in the United States on March 7, 2006, on CBS as a midseason replacement.

== Reception ==
The series premiere drew 18.50 million viewers and ranked as the tenth most watched program on CBS' 2005-06 television schedule.
