= Daniel Voll =

American journalist

Daniel Voll, a Rockford, Illinois native, is a journalist who has written for Esquire, Vanity Fair, and The New York Times. He has reported from Bosnia, South Africa, and covered the U.S. pullout from Iraq for Esquire magazine. He has also written extensively on hate crimes in America and produced the HBO documentary, Soldiers in the Army of God, about the violent wing of the anti-abortion movement. In television he has served as executive producer and writer on the prime time dramas, Lie To Me, The Unit, and Threat Matrix. For Oliver Stone, he adapted the screenplay Patriots, based on his reporting of a racially motivated murder in the 82nd Airborne; and for MGM, he wrote Fire Dogs, about a season he spent fighting forest fires with a convict crew. An Esquire contributing editor, Voll lives in Santa Monica, California, with his wife, Cecilia Peck, and their two children, Harper and Ondine.

On May 22, 2017, various entertainment journals reported Oliver Stone was attached to a television series about the Guantanamo detention camp, that had been created by Voll. Stone is reported to be scheduled to direct every episode of the first season.
