= Abby Brammell =

American actress

- Born: March 19, 1979 (age 47)
- Occupation: Actress
- Years active: 2002–present

Abby Brammell (born March 19, 1979) is an American television and stage actress.

== Career ==
Brammell has had recurring roles on Six Feet Under; and The Shield; Push, Nevada. In 2004, she received good reviews for her performance as Sabina Spielrein in the North American premier of Christopher Hampton's play, The Talking Cure, at the Mark Taper Forum in Los Angeles.

From 2006 to 2009, she appeared in The Unit as army wife Tiffy Gerhardt. She also appeared in NCIS season 8 episode three, "Short Fuse", as Marine Sergeant Heather Dempsey.

She played Tamara Moor in the thriller Playdate (2012), a made-for-television film produced in the United States, and has guest-starred on Medium, The Mentalist, Lie to Me, Criminal Minds, and Castle.

She appeared as the wife of Steve Jobs, played by Ashton Kutcher, in the film Jobs (2013).

On October 11, 2015, it was announced Brammell would voice the female protagonist in Call of Duty: Black Ops III for Microsoft Windows, PlayStation 4, and Xbox One.

== Filmography ==
=== Films ===
List of performances in film
Title	Year	Role	Notes
Sawtooth	2004	Bunny	
The Last Run	2004	Bar-Back Chick	
Like Dandelion Dust	2009	Beth Norton	
No Place, CA	2010	Sue	Short film
In the Black	2011	Ariadne	credited as Abby Brammel
Life Happens	2011	Shiva the Yoga Teacher	
Blind Justice 3D	2012	Donna, The X-Wife	aired at Channel 101 Short Film Festival
Jobs	2013	Laurene Powell Jobs	
North Blvd	2018	Elaine	

=== Television ===
List of performances in television
Title	Year	Role	Notes
Glory Days	2002	Veronica Roberts	Episode: "Everybody Loves Rudy"
CSI: Crime Scene Investigation	2002	Jane Gallagher	Episode: "Primum Non Nocere"
Fastlane	2002	Jade	Episode: "Girls Own Juice"
Push, Nevada	2002	Darlene Prufrock	Recurring role
Birds of Prey	2003	Claire	Episode: "Gladiatrix"
Star Trek: Enterprise	2004	Persis	3 episodes
The Shield	2005	Sara Frazier	4 episodes
Six Feet Under	2005	Kirsten	4 episodes
Crossing Jordan	2005	Marcie Holloman	Episode: "Judgment Day"
The Unit	2006–2009	Tiffy Gerhardt	Main cast (season 1), recurring role (seasons 3–4)
The Mentalist	2009	Constance 'Diamond' Hoyt	Episode: "Red Menace"
Medium	2009	Dana Carlow	Episode: "Baby Fever"
Lie to Me	2009	Poppy Wells	Episode: "Fold Equity"
Castle	2010	Carol Thornton	Episode: "Den of Thieves"
NCIS	2010	Marine Sergeant Heather Dempsey	Episode: "Short Fuse"
CSI: Crime Scene Investigation	2011	Debra	Episode: "Unleashed"
Chase	2011	na	Episode: "Seven Years"
Criminal Minds	2011	Pam	Episode: "The Bittersweet Science"
Playdate	2012	Tamara Moor	TV movie
NCIS: Los Angeles	2012	Megan Hendley	Episode: "Out of the Past: Part 1"
The Night Shift	2014	Ginger Brown	Episode: "Hog Wild"
Longmire	2014	Susan Taylor	Episode: "In the Pines"
Rizzoli & Isles	2015	Linda Hendrickson	Episode: "Bassholes"
J.L. Family Ranch	2016	Regan Landsburg	TV movie
9-1-1	2018, 2021	Eva Mathis	Recurring role (season 1), guest appearances (seasons 2, 5)
S.W.A.T.	2019	Lara Thomas	Episode: "Trigger Creep"
Bosch	2020	Heather Strout	Recurring role (season 6)
Found	2023	Veronica Burkhart	Episode: "Missing While Interracial"
On Call	2025	Jen Harmon	Episode: "L.A. Woman"

=== Video game ===
List of voiced performances in video games
Title	Year	Role
Call of Duty: Black Ops III	2015	Player (Female)
