= Lynn Mamet =

American screenwriter

- Occupations: Theatre director, playwright, screenwriter, and television producer
- Writing career
- Notable works: Law & Order; The Unit

Lynn Mamet (Lynn Mamet Weisberg) is an American theatre director, playwright, screenwriter, and television producer.

== Biography ==
Mamet has written screenplays, fiction, teleplays and short stories. She sold her first screenplay using her married name, Lynn Weisberg; the studio only learned her maiden name after purchasing it. In 1996, the Los Angeles Times described Mamet as "one of the busiest screenwriters in Hollywood."

Her latest and most notable work is as a producer and writer for Law & Order and The Unit. In addition to her work on television, she has also written and directed her own plays, including The Walking Wounded, The Fathers, The Job, The Divorce, and The Lost Years at Playwright's Kitchen Ensemble and the Sanford Meisner Theatres.

She is the sister of David Mamet.

== Selected works ==
=== Plays ===
- The Divorce
- The Job

=== Made for TV movies ===
- All Lies End in Murder

=== Short films ===
- On Hope (1994) written by Mamet, directed by JoBeth Williams Mamet won a 1994 Academy Award nomination for the play.
- "Leslie's Folly (1994) written by Mamet, directed by Kathleen Turner
