= Max Martini =

American actor (born 1969)

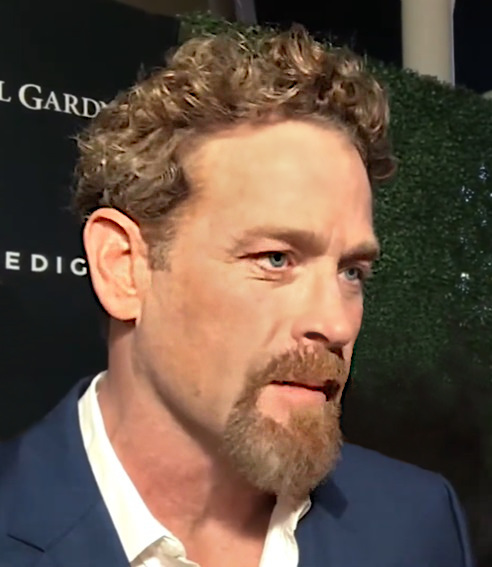
- Martini at Sgt. Will Gardner Premiere 2019
- Born: Maximilian Carlo Martini; December 11, 1969 (age 56); Woodstock, New York, U.S.
- Occupations: Actor; writer; director; producer
- Years active: 1981–present

Maximilian Carlo Martini (born December 11, 1969) is an American actor. He is known for his roles as Wiley in Level 9, First Sergeant Sid Wojo in The Great Raid, and as Master Sergeant Mack Gerhardt in the CBS military drama television series The Unit. He also starred in the film 13 Hours: The Secret Soldiers of Benghazi as Mark Geist. In recent years, Martini appeared in the sci-fi thriller Osiris (2025), and starred in the noir crime drama Hollywood Grit (2025), which he also produced.

== Career ==
=== Film ===
After college, Martini found steady work in film and television projects. His film roles include co-starring opposite Jodie Foster in Robert Zemeckis's Contact as Willie, a fellow scientist with an affinity for brightly colored shirts, and sharing the screen with Tom Hanks and Matt Damon in Saving Private Ryan as Corporal Henderson, ranking NCO of Pfc. James Ryan's unit, who helped Cpt. John H. Miller and his men in the brutal final shootout of the film. Martini later co-starred in John Dahl's The Great Raid as 1st Sgt. Sid Wojo.

He appeared in smaller independent films, working with Calista Flockhart in Jane Doe, Chris Penn and Jeffrey Wright in Cement and in the 2000 Sundance Film Festival fave Backroads. In 1999, Martini wrote, co-directed and starred in Desert Son. His younger brother, Christopher, co-directed the film with him, and his sister, Michelle, served as costume designer. He had a recurring role in the ABC drama Castle. In 2011, the Noor Iranian Film Festival in Los Angeles invited him to participate as an official festival judge. In 2013, he played the role of the U.S. Navy SEAL commander in Paul Greengrass's Academy Award-nominated film Captain Phillips.

In 2013, Guillermo del Toro cast Martini and Rob Kazinsky as the Australian father-son pilot duo in Pacific Rim. In 2014, Martini was cast in Legendary Pictures' supernatural thriller Spectral. Martini played Christian Grey's bodyguard in the film Fifty Shades of Grey (2015), and its two sequels. In 2016, Martini portrayed Mark "Oz" Geist in Michael Bay's 13 Hours: The Secret Soldiers of Benghazi.

Martini made his directorial debut in 2019 with a military drama, Sgt. Will Gardner, in which he also starred as Sgt. Will Gardner.

=== Television and theater ===
Martini's television credits include a lead role in the Sci-fi Channel's Emmy nominated mini-series Taken and appearances as Agent Steve Goodrich on the second season of 24. He was also cast in X-Files creator Chris Carter's Harsh Realm, and had a recurring role in the Canadian series Da Vinci's Inquest. He also appeared in Lie to Me.

After memorable guest-star turns in popular series, including Numb3rs, Walker Texas Ranger, CSI: Crime Scene Investigation and CSI: Miami, Martini landed a lead role in The Unit, a series about a tier-1 US Army special operations team created by David Mamet and produced by Shawn Ryan of The Shield. Martini remains active in the theater, having co-founded the Theatre North Collaborative in New York City, a company of American and Canadian actors dedicated solely to producing new works from both sides of the border. In 2011, he appeared in an episode of Criminal Minds, in which he played a Navy SEAL named Luke Dolan.

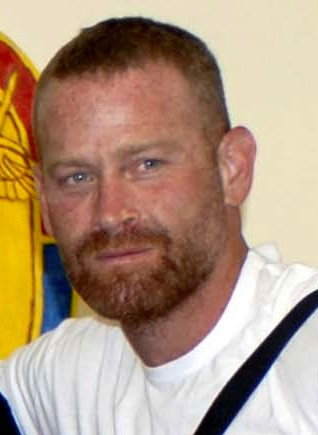
Martini in 2009

In 2015, Martini starred as the title character in Amazon Studios' Western series Edge, written and directed by Shane Black.

In April 2018, Martini was cast in the Netflix horror-drama series The Order.

In August 2022, Martini joined the cast in the second season of the Amazon Freevee Bosch spin-off series Bosch: Legacy as Detective Don Ellis, a hardened vice cop in the LAPD.

== Personal life ==
Martini was born in Woodstock, New York. He holds Italian citizenship through his father, who was born in Rome. He is the stepson of actor-director Stuart Margolin, who married Martini's mother Patricia Dunne Martini in 1982, and has two siblings—costume designer Michelle Martini and editor/ producer/ director Christopher Martini.

== Filmography ==
=== Film ===
Year	Title	Role	Notes
1985	The Glitter Dome	Steven	
1988	Paramedics	Wired Kid	
1995	Pictures of Baby Jane Doe	Charlie	
1997	Contact	Willie	
1998	Saving Private Ryan	Corporal Henderson	
1999	Cement	Mic	
2000	Backroads	Larry	
2001	Another Day	Paul	Television film
2005	Silver Bells	Officer Rip	Television film
2005	The Great Raid	1st Sergeant Sid Wojo	
2008	Redbelt	Officer Joe Collins	
2010	Mandrake	Darren McCall	Television film
2010	Troopers	Finn	
2011	Colombiana	FBI Special Agent Williams	
2013	Pacific Rim	Hercules "Herc" Hansen	
2013	Captain Phillips	U.S. Navy SEAL Commander	
2014	Sabotage	DEA Agent Tom "Pyro" Roberts	
2015	Fifty Shades of Grey	Jason Taylor	
2015	Edge	Josiah "Edge" Hedges	Television film
2016	Spectral	Major Sessions	
2016	13 Hours: The Secret Soldiers of Benghazi	Mark "Oz" Geist	
2017	Fifty Shades Darker	Jason Taylor	
2017	My Little Pony: The Movie	Boyle	Voice
2018	Fifty Shades Freed	Jason Taylor	
2018	Bigger	Jerry George	
2019	Eli	Paul Miller	
2019	Sgt. Will Gardner	Will Gardner	Also director, writer and producer
2020	What the Night Can Do	Marty Cole	Also executive producer
2021	The Tender Bar	Johnny Michaels	
2023	The Channel	Mic Sheridan	
2025	Osiris	Kelly	Also producer
TBA	Bethesda †	Norman	Post-production

Key
†	Denotes films that have not yet been released

=== Television ===
Year	Title	Role	Notes
1996	Walker Texas Ranger	Luke	Episode: "A Silent Cry"
1997	Nash Bridges	Larry Fortina	Episode: "Rampage"
1998–2002	Da Vinci's Inquest	Danny Leary	13 episodes
1999–2000	Harsh Realm	Mel Waters	5 episodes
2000	The Pretender	Todd Baxter	Episode: "Spin Doctor"
2000–2001	Level 9	Jack Wiley	11 episodes
2002	Taken	Colonel Breck	2 episodes
2003, 2011	CSI: Crime Scene Investigation	Jarrod Malone / Jason Kent	2 episodes
2003	The Division	Ryan Hollenbeck	Episode: "Cradle Will Rock"
2003	24	Agent Steve Goodrich	3 episodes
2003–2005	CSI: Miami	Bob Keaton	3 episodes
2004	Try to Remember	Joe O'Connor	Television film
2004	Without a Trace	Nathan Grady / Henry	Episode: "Thou Shalt Not..."
2005	Numb3rs	Billy Cooper	Episode: "Man Hunt"
2006–2009	The Unit	Mack Gerhardt	69 episodes
2008	Burn Notice	Gerard	Episode: "Rough Seas"
2008	Street Warrior	Jack Campbell	Television film
2010	Lie to Me	David Burns	3 episodes
2010	Dark Blue	Tim Rowe	Episode: "High Rollers"
2010	White Collar	U.S. Marshal John Deckard	Episode: "Prisoner's Dilemma"
2010	Hawaii Five-0	Nick Taylor	Episode: "Po'ipu"
2011	Castle	Hal Lockwood	2 episodes
2011	Flashpoint	Bill Greely	Episode: "Good Cop"
2011	Rizzoli & Isles	Dan Mateo	Episode: "Brown Eyed Girl"
2011–2012	Revenge	Frank Stevens	7 episodes
2011	Criminal Minds	Luke Dolan	Episode: "Dorado Falls"
2012	The Mentalist	Fletcher Moss	Episode: "Blood Feud"
2013	Republic of Doyle	Charlie "Big Charlie"	2 episodes
2013	Person of Interest	"RIP"	Episode: "Liberty"
2014	Crisis	Koz	13 episodes
2016	Real Detective	Detective Tommy Ray	Episode: "Darkness"
2016	Motive	James Lennathan	Episode: "Remains to Be Seen"
2017	Training Day	Agent Jack Ivers	3 episodes
2018–2019	NCIS: Los Angeles	Arlo Turk	5 episodes
2019	The Order	Edward Coventry	8 episodes
2019	Doom Patrol	Alistair	Episode: "Hair Patrol"
2019	The Purge	Ryan Grant	Season 2: 10 episodes
2021	Pacific Rim: The Black	Herc Hansen (cameo + voice cameo)	Episode: "Escaping Bogan"
2022	Bosch: Legacy	Detective Don Ellis	recurring role
2024	Lioness	Tracer	recurring role
2025	FBI	Bobby Galloway	Episode: "Boy Scout"
2026	Chicago Fire	Deputy District Chief Cranston	Episode: "Coming in Hot"
