= Lethal Weapon 3 =

1992 American film directed by Richard Donner

- Theatrical release poster
- Directed by: Richard Donner
- Screenplay by: Jeffrey Boam (Note: Boam is credited twice for screenplay; on-screen credits read "Screenplay by Jeffrey Boam and Jeffrey Boam & Robert Mark Kamen".); Robert Mark Kamen
- Story by: Jeffrey Boam
- Based on: Characters by Shane Black
- Produced by: Richard Donner; Joel Silver
- Starring: Mel Gibson; Danny Glover; Joe Pesci; Rene Russo; Stuart Wilson
- Cinematography: Jan de Bont
- Edited by: Robert Brown; Battle Davis
- Music by: Michael Kamen; Eric Clapton; David Sanborn
- Production company: Silver Pictures
- Distributed by: Warner Bros.
- Release date: May 15, 1992
- Running time: 118 minutes
- Country: United States
- Language: English
- Budget: $35 million
- Box office: $321.7 million

Lethal Weapon 3 is a 1992 American buddy cop action comedy film directed by Richard Donner and written by Jeffrey Boam and Robert Mark Kamen. The sequel to Lethal Weapon 2 (1989), it is the third installment in the Lethal Weapon film series and stars Mel Gibson, Danny Glover, Joe Pesci, Rene Russo, and Stuart Wilson.

In Lethal Weapon 3, LAPD sergeant Martin Riggs (Gibson) and lieutenant Roger Murtaugh (Glover) pursue Jack Travis (Wilson), a former LAPD lieutenant turned ruthless arms dealer, during the six days prior to Murtaugh's retirement. Riggs and Murtaugh are joined by Leo Getz (Pesci) as well as internal affairs Sergeant Lorna Cole (Russo).

Lethal Weapon 3 was released by Warner Bros. on May 15, 1992. The film was a box office success, grossing over $320 million worldwide. It was the fifth-highest-grossing film of 1992 and the highest-grossing installment in the series overall. The film was followed by Lethal Weapon 4 in 1998.

== Plot ==
A week before his retirement, LAPD Lieutenant Roger Murtaugh and Sergeant Martin Riggs are demoted to uniform duties after failing to defuse an office building bomb. While on street patrol they witness the theft of an armored car, and help to thwart the crime assisted by armored car driver Delores. One of the two thieves, Smitty, gets away, but the other, Billy Phelps, is taken into police custody. The suspect is a known associate of Jack Travis, a former LAPD lieutenant who is running a local arms smuggling ring. The criminals were using armor-piercing bullets. Riggs and Murtaugh are re-promoted and assigned to work with Sergeant Lorna Cole from internal affairs to track down Travis.

Travis is negotiating with mobster Tyrone regarding his arms deal. Smitty is brought to Travis, who kills him for putting the police on his trail. Travis then uses his old police credentials to enter the interrogation room and kill Phelps in custody before he can be interviewed. However, closed-circuit cameras have since been installed in the station without Travis' knowledge, so Cole manages to confirm Travis' identity. While the three are reviewing the footage, their friend Leo Getz, who has been helping Murtaugh sell his house, arrives and recognizes Travis from prior business deals. Murtaugh, Riggs, and Getz narrowly miss capturing Travis at a hockey match, and Getz is wounded. Getz mentions a warehouse Travis owns, which is where he has stored his arms shipments.

Riggs and Murtaugh contact Cole for backup before they raid the warehouse, stopping at a food truck to wait for her. While waiting for their food, they witness a drug deal and attempt to cease it. Murtaugh kills a gunman who fired at them, while the others retreat. Afterwards, Murtaugh recognizes the gunman, his son Nick's close friend, Darryl. As Murtaugh is emotionally distraught, Riggs and Cole head to the warehouse and secure Travis' next arms shipment delivery. That night, Riggs and Cole have sex. He later finds a guilt-ridden Murtaugh drunk on his boat and consoles him in time for Darryl's funeral. There, Darryl's father insists that Murtaugh find the person responsible for giving Darryl the gun.

Cole discovers that Darryl's gun, the armor-piercing bullets, and the arms they recovered were originally in police custody, meant to be destroyed, and Travis stole them; they revoke his credentials from the system. They further tie the guns to Tyrone and interrogate him. He directs them to an auto garage from where many of Travis' henchmen work. Riggs, Murtaugh, and Cole manage to arrest several of the men.

Meanwhile, Travis has one of his men hack into the computer system to find another arms storage area. To steal the guns using Captain Murphy's credentials, he forces him at gunpoint to take him to this new facility. Cole finds the evidence of hacking and Murphy's absence, and the trio, along with rookie cop Edwards intercept Travis. They manage to rescue Murphy and engage in a shootout with Travis and his men before he can possess the weapons, but Edwards is killed by armor-piercing bullets during their pursuit. Travis also escapes.

Getz provides information on a housing development owned by Travis's shell company. Riggs, Murtaugh, and Cole infiltrate the site at night and find themselves in a gun battle. Riggs sets the construction site on fire and all of Travis' men are killed, while Travis wounds Cole. When Travis uses a bulldozer to chase down Riggs, using its blade as a bullet shield, Murtaugh tosses Darryl's gun, now loaded with the armor-piercing bullets, to Riggs, who shoots and kills Travis through the blade. After learning that Cole wore two layers of kevlar vests, Riggs admits his love for her as she is taken away in a chopper.

The next day, Murtaugh's family is celebrating his retirement, when Murtaugh reveals to his family and Getz that he has decided to not sell the house and stay with the force, preserving his partnership with Riggs.

== Cast ==
- Mel Gibson as Martin Riggs
- Danny Glover as Roger Murtaugh
- Joe Pesci as Leo Getz
- Rene Russo as Lorna Cole
- Stuart Wilson as Jack Travis
- Steve Kahan as Captain Ed Murphy
- Alan Scarfe as Herman Walters
- Nick Chinlund as Hatchett
- Traci Wolfe as Rianne Murtaugh
- Darlene Love as Trish Murtaugh

In addition, Delores Hall appears as Delores, the armoured car driver. Other series regulars, who appear in minor roles in all four films of the franchise, include: Damon Hines and Ebonie Smith as Murtaugh children Nick and Carrie, respectively; and Mary Ellen Trainor as psychologist Stephanie Woods.

== Production ==
Lethal Weapon 3 was filmed from October 1991 to January 1992.

Richard Donner, an animal-rights and pro-choice activist, placed many posters and stickers for these causes in the film. Of note are the T-shirt worn by one of Murtaugh's daughters (the actress's idea), an 18-wheeler with an anti-fur slogan on the side, and a sticker on a locker in the police station.

=== Demolition scenes ===
In the film's first scene, Riggs accidentally sets off a bomb that destroys the ICSI Building. The ICSI Building was actually the former City Hall building of Orlando, Florida, located at the intersection of Orange Avenue and South Street in Downtown Orlando. Warner Bros. decided to use the destruction of the building in the film, and as a result paid $500,000 for the demolition. From August to October 1991, the production crew fitted the old Orlando City Hall building featured in the opening scene with carefully placed explosives to create the visual effect of a bomb explosion. Bill Frederick, then mayor of Orlando, Florida, was the policeman who sarcastically claps and said "Bravo!" to Murtaugh and Riggs after the explosion.

The building was demolished so that it would collapse slightly forward (toward Orange Avenue), minimizing the chances of it damaging the new City Hall building, built directly behind it. The space was cleared out and became a plaza for the new City Hall, with a fountain and a monument.

The film's climax scene, where an under-construction housing development is set ablaze, was filmed at an unfinished housing development in Lancaster, California. The unfinished houses, which had been sitting abandoned and slated to be torn down, were coated in flame retardant and propane gas lines to ensure that the houses could withstand re-shoots. The original homes were eventually demolished and was eventually redeveloped into another housing development.

During the closing credits, Riggs and Murtaugh drive up to an old hotel where another bomb has been placed. Before they (their doubles) can exit the car, the bomb explodes and destroys the building. The hotel was actually the former Soreno Hotel in downtown St. Petersburg, Florida. The film's producers agreed to help with the cost of the 68-year-old building's implosion for the purposes of their film.

=== Hockey game ===
A November 26, 1991 NHL game between the Los Angeles Kings and the Toronto Maple Leafs at the Great Western Forum served as the basis for the hockey scene featured in the movie. The league allowed production to capture the real-life action, although goaltender Kelly Hrudey eventually became annoyed with the additional lights used by the crew and asked filming to stop.

The NHL also let Donner stage part of the scene, where Riggs commandeers the arena's PA system to lure out Jack Travis, during the game's second intermission. It was completed in two takes. However, the director was not allowed to film the segment where Riggs chases down Travis onto the ice that evening. It was completed after a Kings practice. In closer shots, these sequences used extras dressed in unlicensed jerseys that only roughly resemble those worn by the actual teams. A contemporary AP report cites Lethal Weapon's excessive violence as the reason why the NHL limited its collaboration. However, the organization took a relaxed stance towards the more intense Sudden Death a few years later. The Los Angeles Kings later featured in a season three episode of the Lethal Weapon TV series, entitled "What The Puck?".

=== Writing ===
Jeffrey Boam's first two drafts of the script were different from the final film. The character of Lorna for example was not a woman in original drafts, but the original character still had the same personality and was just as lethal and crazy as Riggs, making him his match. Riggs also had an affair with Roger's daughter Rianne, and a few parts in the final film where Roger suspects that Riggs and Rianne are interested in each other are only parts left from the original drafts.

Director Richard Donner demanded some big changes on the script which included changing the original character of Lorna (who had a different name in earlier drafts) into a woman and turning her into Riggs's girlfriend. He also re-worked the script to be less story-oriented and not focus on the main villains but instead on the relationship between Riggs and Murtaugh. He also toned down action scenes from the script and brought back Leo Getz into the story. All of his scenes were written in afterwards. In the original script Leo had left L.A. for New York. Boam had some disagreements with changes that Donner made, but he was not against them. Boam was fired after he wrote his first two drafts of the script. One of the reasons for this was because Donner wasn't interested in the script and he disagreed with some parts of Boam's original draft. After another writer, Robert Mark Kamen, was hired to re-write the script, Boam was called to return to work on it again. The filmmakers realized that Kamen's re-writes were not working. Boam asked to work alone on the script and ended up constantly changing it from October 1991 until January 1992 while filming was taking place. These types of changes also occurred during the filming of Lethal Weapon 2.

According to Kamen in a 2012 interview, many of his writing contributions ended up in the final film. Kamen also wrote many parts of the previous film in the series, with the most significant portions being the South African villains.

Screenwriter Jeffrey Boam is credited twice in the "screenplay by" credits. This is because he did one draft by himself (granting him the first credit) and a second draft collaborating with Robert Mark Kamen (granting him the second credit). In this rare scenario, Boam was hired to rewrite his own script with a second writer. After receiving the unusual writing credits, the advertising department assumed it was a misprint and produced posters with the credits "Story by Jeffrey Boam, Screenplay by Jeffrey Boam and Robert Mark Kamen". After a few of the posters had been sent out, the WGA contacted the department, telling them that the initial credits were the correct ones, and ordering the posters to be recalled and destroyed.

Carrie Fisher was an uncredited script doctor on the film.

=== Martial arts ===
Russo received martial arts training for a month before shooting from Cheryl Wheeler-Dixon, who had a karate background and was a former kickboxing champion, and Wheeler-Dixon was also her stunt double. Brazilian Jiu-Jitsu instructor Rorion Gracie, who had taught Gibson and Gary Busey in the first movie of the series in 1987, also provided training to Russo and acted as stuntman for a fight scene.

== Promotion ==
To promote the film, theater lobbies featured a 3-D cutout of the film poster of Riggs and Murtaugh posing with their guns and Leo Getz peeking from the background. On the display, there was a motor which helped Leo's head bob up and down from behind them.

== Release ==
=== Box office ===
Lethal Weapon 3 made $33.2 million during its opening weekend. It held the record for having the highest May opening weekend until Twister replaced it four years later in 1996. The $35 million film was a big box-office success, earning $145 million. Although slightly less than the $150 million domestic gross of the first sequel, it was nevertheless the second-most successful summer film of 1992 (after Batman Returns) and the fifth most profitable film of the year, as well as the highest-grossing in the film series worldwide with $320 million worldwide.

After the film's success, Warner Bros. head Robert A. Daly bought Land Rovers for Gibson, Glover, Pesci, Russo, Donner, Boam, and producer Joel Silver. Daly later said "It cost us $320,000 to buy those Land Rovers, and we were criticized left and right for the expense. Do you know what it got us? Lethal Weapon 4, which made $285 million".

=== Critical reception ===
On the review aggregator website Rotten Tomatoes, 61% of 49 critics' reviews are positive, with an average rating of 5.6/10. The website's consensus reads: "Murtaugh and Riggs remain an appealing partnership, but Lethal Weapon 3 struggles to give them a worthy new adventure as it cranks up the camp along with the mean-spiritedness." Metacritic, which uses a weighted average, assigned the film a score of 40 out of 100, based on 26 critics, indicating "mixed or average" reviews.

Roger Ebert of the Chicago Sun-Times gave the film a positive review, awarding it 3 out of 4 stars.

In 2025, The Hollywood Reporter listed Lethal Weapon 3 as having the best stunts of 1992.

=== Home media ===
Lethal Weapon 3 has been released on VHS and DVD numerous times. The first DVD was released in 1997 and featured the film's theatrical version. The 1997 DVD contains both the widescreen and the pan and scan editions. The Director's Cut was released in 2000. Since then, numerous sets have been released that contain all four films in the series (featuring the same DVDs). The film was released on Blu-ray Disc in 2011.

== Soundtrack ==
Lethal Weapon 3

Soundtrack album by Michael Kamen, Eric Clapton, David Sanborn, Sting, Elton John, The Los Angeles Motion Picture All Stars Orchestra
- Released: June 9, 1992 (Original); December 3, 2013 (Expanded)
- Genres: Orchestral, jazz, blues
- Length: 39:32 (Original); 126:35 (Expanded)
- Labels: Reprise (Original); La-La Land (Expanded)

Michael Kamen, Eric Clapton, David Sanborn, Sting, Elton John, The Los Angeles Motion Picture All Stars Orchestra chronology
Lethal Weapon 2 (1989)	Lethal Weapon 3 (1992)	Lethal Weapon 4 (1998)

Lethal Weapon 3 (Original Motion Picture Soundtrack) was released on June 9, 1992, on audio cassette and CD. The soundtrack was performed and composed by Michael Kamen, Eric Clapton, and David Sanborn. Its title songs, "It's Probably Me", and "Runaway Train" were written and performed by Eric Clapton with the assistance of Sting and Elton John respectively.

In 2013, La-La Land Records issued the complete score on a two-disc set as part of Lethal Weapon: Soundtrack Collection.

=== Track listing ===
==== Original album ====
1. "It's Probably Me" by Sting and Eric Clapton
2. "Runaway Train" by Elton John and Eric Clapton
3. "Grab the Cat"
4. "Leo Getz Goes to the Hockey Game"
5. "Darryl Dies"
6. "Riggs and Rog"
7. "Roger's Boat"
8. "Armour Piercing Bullets"
9. "God Judges Us by Our Scars"
10. "Lorna – A Quiet Evening by the Fire"

==== La-La Land album ====
Tracks with one asterisk are previously unreleased, tracks with two asterisks contain previously unreleased material.

Disc one

1. "Trust Me" – 3:34 *
2. "Afterglow" – 0:57
3. "Jaywalker" – 2:01 *
4. "Armoured Car Chase" – 4:33 *
5. "Leo Getz" – 3:20 **
6. "Concrete Death" – 1:59 **
7. "Rianne's Big Break" – 2:16 *
8. "Locker Room" – 0:43 *
9. "Firing Range" – 0:59 *
10. "Jack Kills Billy" – 3:15 *
11. "Hockey Game" – 0:58 *
12. "Dum-Dum Wound" – 1:07 *
13. "Shooting Darryl, Part 1" – 3:12 **
14. "Shooting Darryl, Part 2/Step into My Office" – 2:17 **
15. "Man's Best Friend/Lorna's First Fight" – 6:41 **, *
16. "Scars/Love Scene" – 3:45 *
17. "Roger's Boat" – 5:28 **
18. "Shaving" – 1:17 *
19. "Gun Montage/Lorna's Second Fight" – 3:33 *
20. "Captain Abducted/Captain and Travis" – 1:34 *
21. "Unauthorized Access" – 1:57 *
22. "Gun Battle" – 3:47 **
23. "Riggs Falls" – 2:11 *
24. "Drive to Housing Development/On Three" – 3:34 *
25. "Fire/Fire Battle/A Quiet Evening by the Fire" – 7:01 *

Disc two

Original album as above, followed by: Additional tracks

1. "Leo Getz" (alternate) – 2:38 *
2. "Armoured Car Chase" (no overlay) – 4:33 *
3. "Gun Battle" (alternate) – 5:26 *
4. "I Can't Retire" – 1:30 **

== Video games ==
Several versions of a Lethal Weapon video game were released in conjunction with this sequel's release, appearing on the NES, SNES, Game Boy, Amiga, Atari ST, and Commodore 64 platforms.

Also released was a Lethal Weapon 3 pinball game.
