= List of Lethal Weapon episodes =

Lethal Weapon is an American buddy cop action comedy-drama television series that is based on the film series of the same name created by Shane Black. The series stars Damon Wayans as Roger Murtaugh, a senior Los Angeles Police Department detective who returns to the force, after recovering from a heart attack, and is partnered with Texas transfer Martin Riggs, played by Clayne Crawford. Riggs, a Navy SEAL-turned-police officer from El Paso, Texas, moves to Los Angeles after the death of his wife and unborn child, transferring from the El Paso County Sheriff's Office to the LAPD's Robbery-Homicide Division.

The series was ordered in May 2016 and premiered on Fox on September 21. The series was renewed for a 15-episode third season, premiered on November 22 with Seann William Scott replacing Clayne Crawford as the series' co-lead, playing new character Wesley Cole.

During the course of the series, 55 episodes of Lethal Weapon aired over three seasons, between September 21, 2016, and February 26, 2019.

== Series overview ==
Season	Episodes	Originally released	
Season	Episodes	First released	Last released
1	18	September 21, 2016	March 15, 2017
2	22	September 26, 2017	May 8, 2018
3	15	September 25, 2018	February 26, 2019

== Episodes ==
=== Season 1 (2016–2017) ===
No. overall	No. in season	Title	Directed by	Written by	Original release date	Prod. code	U.S. viewers (millions)
1	1	"Pilot"	McG	Story by : Matt Miller & Shane Black; Teleplay by : Matt Miller	September 21, 2016	T15.10138	7.93
Martin Riggs (Clayne Crawford), a slightly unhinged widower and former Navy SEAL, lands a job as a police officer in Los Angeles where he is partnered with Roger Murtaugh (Damon Wayans), a veteran detective who is trying to maintain a low level of stress in his life.
2	2	"Surf N Turf"	McG	Matt Miller	September 28, 2016	T13.20102	7.23
Murtaugh and Riggs are sent to deal with a noise complaint at a party. And when they arrive there are shots fired. They chase the shooter only he was killed. They go back to the Captain who is with an ATF agent who tells them the weapon that was used is strictly for military use, which means someone got their hands on some and are trying to sell it. Riggs upon looking over what happened doesn't think the one who was killed is the target. They think it's someone else, a woman. They track her down and learn she's from Russia and pregnant. She tells them that a few months ago she got involved with a guy and she caught him trying to unload the guns and when he saw her, he tried to kill her that's why she ran. And evidently, the shooter was there to sell the gun when he saw her and told probably the guy she was there, who told him to take care of her. They put her in protective custody while they try to find out were the guns came from. Murtaugh finally learns about Riggs and his wife.
3	3	"Best Buds"	Steve Boyum	Gene Hong	October 5, 2016	T13.20103	6.62
Riggs and Murtaugh follow a violent case involving a drug cartel, theft, two killings and Murtaugh's old T.O., Ned Brower. As the case unfolds, it turns out that Ned is more involved than just driving the cash, which leaves Murtaugh with an inevitably dangerous decision to make. Looking for back-up, the duo turns to Cruz for help. In the midst of all the chaos, Riggs continues to depend on outside vices, rather than face the reality of Miranda's death, while Murtaugh and Trish struggle to find alone time. Miranda Riggs appears as a vision to Riggs early in the episode and at the very end he remembers walking up to her parents home with her for the first time.
4	4	"There Goes the Neighborhood"	Jason Ensler	Adele Lim	October 12, 2016	T13.20104	6.84
A string of burglaries hits close to home for Murtaugh when one occurs in his own neighborhood, and it gets just as personal for Riggs when another break-in ends in a casualty. Meanwhile, Roger Junior connects with an old friend who might be twisted up in some criminal action of his own.
5	5	"Spilt Milk"	Larry Teng	Seamus Kevin Fahey	October 19, 2016	T13.20105	6.66
Murtaugh delves deep into the psyche of a former navy seal who is wanted for criminal activity, and draws parallels between him and his partner, Riggs, who also served in the military. Riggs's connection to the suspect threatens to interfere with the case, but it also forces him to open up to Murtaugh.
6	6	"Ties That Bind"	Antonio Negret	Erik Mountain	November 9, 2016	T13.20106	7.02
When Riggs and Murtaugh investigate a high-profile case surrounding the murder of a young model, they uncover a vicious secret behind the locked mansion gates of one of LA's wealthiest families. Riggs gets a jolt from his past when he discovers that an old friend of his wife has ties to the case. Back at home, Murtaugh is shocked to hear that his daughter is sending provocative photos to her new boyfriend.
7	7	"Fashion Police"	Rob Seidenglanz	Kyle Warren	November 16, 2016	T13.20107	6.60
As Riggs and Murtaugh examine the murder of one of L.A.'s fashion expeditors, they follow a trail of evidence that leads them to an ongoing and exceptionally dangerous underground investigation led by the DEA agent Karen Palmer (Hilarie Burton). In the meantime, Trish and the kids are off visiting colleges, leaving Murtaugh to a "bender" of his own, while Riggs has trouble sleeping through the night due to his all-too-real dreams of Miranda.
8	8	"Can I Get a Witness?"	Jason Ensler	Amanda Green	November 30, 2016	T13.20108	6.43
When a million dollar casino heist takes a deadly turn, Riggs befriends the only credible witness, an eight-year-old boy, and takes him into his care. On the flip side, Murtaugh pulls some dangerous stunts in an attempt to prove to everyone that he can be a motorcycle guy. Meanwhile, Riggs contemplates what to do with the money he received from selling his home in Texas.
9	9	"Jingle Bell Glock"	Steve Boyum	Joe Smith	December 7, 2016	T13.20110	6.26
The whole precinct's holiday celebrations are cut short when they're called to examine a ruthless homicide linked to Eddie Flores (Raul Casso), the deranged nephew of a notable drug lord who has a previous history with Riggs. The holiday season weighs heavily on Riggs, who flashes back to past Christmas with his former wife, Miranda. Murtaugh is also a little preoccupied with his neighbor's obnoxious holiday decorations.
10	10	"Homebodies"	Michael Fields	Alex Taub	January 4, 2017	T13.20111	6.30
Riggs and Murtaugh end up in the middle of a turf war as they investigate the murder of a millennial "designer drug" dealer.
11	11	"Lawmen"	Sylvain White	Andy Callahan	January 11, 2017	T13.20109	6.48
Riggs and Murtaugh are pitted against the LA Sheriff's department.
12	12	"Brotherly Love"	Uta Briesewitz	Stacy A. Littlejohn	January 18, 2017	T13.20112	6.29
Riggs and Murtaugh get involved with a notorious auto theft ring after a car containing a large amount of cocaine is stolen from the impound lot.
13	13	"The Seal is Broken"	Nathan Hope	Adele Lim & Gene Hong	January 25, 2017	T13.20113	6.28
Riggs and Murtaugh investigate a series of violent crimes targeting members of the same church; the anniversary of Miranda's death weighs on Riggs; Trish and Roger butt heads with R.J.
14	14	"The Murtaugh File"	Matt Barber	Seamus Kevin Fahey	February 8, 2017	T13.20114	6.25
A car crash reveals that Cahill is the target of a murderous stalker; Riggs finds Murtaugh's file in Cahill's office and becomes obsessed with finding out about his past; Roger and Trish discover their daughter has a fake ID.
15	15	"As Good As It Getz"	Nick Copus	Rob Wright	February 15, 2017	T13.20115	6.37
Riggs and Murtaugh are forced to work with DEA agent Karen Palmer again, to protect Leo Getz, an ambulance-chasing attorney who was linked to the Cartel. As the three delve further into the case, they begin to realize that Leo may not be the only one with a target on his back. In the meantime, Riggs begins to view Agent Palmer in a new light while Murtaugh is left worried after Trish makes a spontaneous decision.
16	16	"Unnecessary Roughness"	Bethany Rooney	Laura Putney & Margaret Easley	February 22, 2017	T13.20116	6.26
A murder involving a high school football phenomenon draws Riggs and Murtaugh into the lucrative - and corrupt - world of college recruiting. Meanwhile, Murtaugh considers a big change in his professional life, and Riggs contemplates an even bigger shift in his personal life, as he spends more time with DEA Agent Karen Palmer.
17	17	"A Problem Like Maria"	Rob Bailey	Alex Taub	March 8, 2017	T13.20117	5.93
Riggs and Murtaugh team up again with DEA Agent Karen Palmer, and together they gain inside knowledge of dangerous new cartel operations. As Riggs's attachment to Palmer deepens, so do his impulsive actions, further worrying Captain Avery and Delgado. In the meantime, Trish explores the potential of an amazing new career opportunity.
18	18	"Commencement"	Steve Boyum	Matt Miller & Kyle Warren	March 15, 2017	T13.20118	6.02
After making a startling discovery that pertains to Miranda's death, Riggs heads to Mexico and the cartel in search of answers. Worried about Riggs, Murtaugh is seen driving into the night to Mexico.

=== Season 2 (2017–2018) ===
No. overall	No. in season	Title	Directed by	Written by	Original release date	Prod. code	U.S. viewers (millions)
19	1	"El Gringo Loco"	Steve Boyum	Matt Miller & Kyle Warren	September 26, 2017	T13.20701	4.37
Murtaugh intercepts Riggs just as he is preparing to shoot and kill Tito Flores, the drug lord responsible for Miranda's death. He convinces Riggs to bring Tito back to the U.S. alive, in the trunk of Murtaugh's car. When they prepare to turn Tito over to U.S. authorities, however, they open the trunk and discover Tito has been shot in the head and killed.
20	2	"Dancing in September"	Rob Bailey	Alex Taub	October 3, 2017	T13.20702	4.10
Riggs and Murtaugh respond to the death of a plastic surgeon, drawing them into a case involving an illegal drug ring run out of a wellness clinic. The case has Riggs reconnecting with Agent Karen Palmer, who has been given desk work at the DEA ever since she leaked the Tito Flores file to Riggs. Karen, blind-sided by her greed to get out of the desk work, hijacks the investigation by interfering with Riggs job only to realize that she is not as efficient as she thinks she is. Begrudgingly, she blames Riggs for it. Riggs, knowing her ego, says he is sorry even though he knows that it was not his fault. Elsewhere, RJ is packing for college and seems reluctant to live on campus, until he learns that his dorm building is co-ed, which then has dad and mom concerned.
21	3	"Born to Run"	Nathan Hope	Stacy A. Littlejohn	October 10, 2017	T13.20703	3.89
Riggs and Murtaugh, along with young detective Zach Bowman (Andrew Creer), investigate when the bodyguard of famous pop singer Shaye (Joanna Levesque) is murdered. The detectives uncover a secret relationship between Shaye and the bodyguard, along with an even bigger secret in Shaye's past. Meanwhile, Riggs and Palmer struggle to find normalcy in their relationship.
22	4	"Flight Risk"	Omar Madha	Seamus Kevin Fahey	October 17, 2017	T13.20704	3.79
A lifelong con man (Adrian Pasdar) robs the passengers on a private plane at gunpoint while it is airborne, then leaps out with a parachute, taking a victim with him. Riggs and Murtaugh learn that the con man is dying and wanted one last haul to help his daughter after he's gone, but one stolen item (a briefcase full of uncut diamonds) has attracted a group of violent criminals. Meanwhile, Santos questions Avery's ability to lead, given his top detectives' penchant for danger.
23	5	"Let it Ride"	Eric Laneuville	Rob Wright	November 7, 2017	T13.20705	4.06
Riggs and Murtaugh investigate a death that occurs moments before the victim's bet wins a horse race. The victim is Howard, a friend of Leo Getz. While it appears that Howard had a stroke, Getz is convinced it's murder, which Scorsese later proves to be true. Meanwhile, the city tows Riggs's trailer off the beach, bringing back painful childhood memories of being evicted.
24	6	"Gold Rush"	Steve Boyum	Terence Paul Winter	November 14, 2017	T13.20706	3.84
Riggs helps his childhood friend Jake (Linds Edwards) get paroled from prison, but it soon becomes apparent that Jake is up to no good again. Noticing that Riggs gives Jake a lot of leeway, Murtaugh asks his partner if he owes his old pal a favor. Elsewhere, Murtaugh tries to find out which of his family members left a marijuana joint in a package of cookies, while Bailey gives Bowman a hard time just because he rejected her after she accidentally sent him a sext.
25	7	"Birdwatching"	Salli Richardson-Whitfield	Elizabeth Davis Beall	November 21, 2017	T13.20707	3.86
Riggs and Murtaugh work on the case of a dead surfer who just came into town from San Diego the day before. Bailey and Bowman help, and Bailey wonders why Bowman is treated like a hero in the beach town. Meanwhile, Murtaugh becomes suspicious of Trish's relationship with her charity ball co-chair "Scott", until he learns it is ex-NBA star Scottie Pippen. Also, Riggs deals with recurring nightmares.
26	8	"Fork-Getta-Bout-It"	Matt Barber	Michael C. Martin & Joe Smith	November 28, 2017	T13.20708	4.89
Riggs and Murtaugh investigate a murder involving a couple and a New York mobster, Frank Truno. Scorsese reveals a movie script he has been writing, after he found out that the case revolves around the mafia. However, Murtaugh dislikes the way Scorsese accurately portrays him as one of the characters. Meanwhile, Riggs is taken aback when his childhood friend Molly (Kristen Gutoskie) suggests that they could have been romantically involved.
27	9	"Fools Rush In"	Eric Laneuville	Kyle Warren & Eileen Jones	December 5, 2017	T13.20709	4.50
Jonah (Derek Richardson), a man with schizophrenia who believes that Elvis Presley is alive and controlling Hollywood's traffic, is running away from Riggs and Murtaugh after being suspected of murder. However, when he proves his theory, Riggs and Murtaugh must stop an organized heist conducted by men dressing as Presley. At the same time, Murtaugh tries to get his daughter into at an esteemed pre-school and Riggs gets scared when his relationship with Molly becomes romantic.
28	10	"Wreck the Halls"	Steve Boyum	Katie Varney	December 12, 2017	T13.20710	4.08
Murtaugh is ready for his family holiday in Hawaii until Diego, a young man he once helped, is murdered. Riggs and Murtaugh confront Grant Davenport (Martin Donovan), the president of an American upper class club where Diego was employed, who has ties to the Aryan fraternity. However, their confrontation causes the fraternity to ambush both of them. Murtaugh manages to subdue his attackers, but Riggs is only able to escape because of his father's assistance.
29	11	"Funny Money"	Nathan Hope	Alex Taub	January 2, 2018	T13.20711	4.55
Riggs and Murtaugh take on a counterfeiting ring and are joined on the case by veteran Secret Service Agent Peterson (Ernie Hudson). A group of three teenagers inadvertently get involved when they witness a shooting and run off with the phony cash and plates. One of the teenagers named Ty (Nathan Davis Jr.) strikes a chord with Riggs after revealing he's homeless. Meanwhile, Riggs brings home a dog for Ben and Molly. Molly later finds the dog dead with its neck snapped. Sensing it's a message from his father, Riggs goes to confront him in prison. Also, Roger and Trish learn that RJ has been cutting classes at college.
30	12	"Diggin' Up Dirt"	Maja Vrvilo	Seamus Kevin Fahey & Joe Smith	January 9, 2018	T13.20712	4.26
Shortly after Gene Nakahara (C.S. Lee) meets with Trish and an uninvited Leo Getz to announce he is running against Councilman Sean O'Brien (Michael Reilly Burke) for Mayor of Los Angeles, Gene is killed when his car blows up. Riggs and Murtaugh learn of a private investigator named Serrano (Tim Kang) who works as a "fixer" for high-profile people and investigate that angle, while Trish and Leo work behind the scenes to reveal skeletons in O'Brien's closet. Riggs also learns that his late wife Miranda once visited Serrano to get info on Riggs's father.
31	13	"Better Living Through Chemistry"	Rob Bailey	Zev Borow	January 16, 2018	T13.20713	5.03
Dr. Cahill begins to question her abilities when two patients of hers die in separate incidents, until it is learned that they were briefly roommates in the same psych facility. Riggs and Murtaugh uncover corruption in the facility related to the medications both patients were taking. At the same time, Santos (Michelle Hurd) learns that Riggs had an anger incident caught on tape in which he destroyed the deputy mayor's car, and requests that Cahill sign an affidavit confirming that Riggs is still fit for duty. Elsewhere, Trish and Roger see that RJ has become depressed and withdrawn after dropping out of college, and decide to take their son to a therapist.
32	14	"Double Shot of Baileys"	John Behring	Stacy A. Littlejohn	January 23, 2018	T13.20714	4.55
Detective Bailey's younger sister Jess (Alisha Wainwright) inadvertently gets caught up with a drug mob when she and her boyfriend use her waitress position at a high-end night club to steal a man's wallet. After the boyfriend is killed over the wallet's contents, Bailey walks a thin line between her obligation to the law and protecting her sister. Elsewhere, Murtaugh helps Riana spy on her boyfriend, whom she accuses of cheating, while Riggs loses his truck after a night of heavy drinking.
33	15	"An Inconvenient Ruth"	Larry Teng	Kyle Warren	February 6, 2018	T13.20715	4.35
An elderly drifter named Ruthie (Swoosie Kurtz) is present at a jewelry store robbery, and becomes a key witness in the case. In the process, she and Riggs, who has recently vowed to stay sober, bond over their alcoholism. Meanwhile Murtaugh, fresh off being called "grandpa" at the playground while with his toddler, starts acting like Riggs and takes dangerous risks to prove he's not getting old. This gets him on Trish's bad side.
34	16	"Ruthless"	Silver Tree	Carlos Jacott	February 27, 2018	T13.20716	4.13
Riggs and Murtaugh track a group of criminals who stole numerous guns during a shoot-up at a police buy-back event. They locate and capture the group's leader, Booker (Sheaun McKinney), only to learn that he's working undercover for ATF. Avery learns from Booker's boss that Booker is a bit of a loose cannon, much like Riggs. Meanwhile, Riggs learns a little more about Ruthie's past and family situation, as Roger and Trish continue to fight at home.
35	17	"The Odd Couple"	Larry Teng	Elizabeth Davis Beall & Eileen Jones	March 6, 2018	T13.20717	4.00
With Riggs trying to get Murtaugh to make up with Trish and get out of his trailer, the two only make things worse when they ruin a public building implosion for Trish's latest project. An angry Trish tells the two that her client, grocery store magnate Henry Butler (Michael McGrady), now wants to bail on the project. Riggs convinces Butler to stay in town by inviting him to dinner. Riggs and Murtaugh discover that Butler is the man behind the murder, and Trish eventually also learns that her client is dirty. This leads to a wild adventure when Riggs and Murtagh board Butler's private jet as he's trying to flee. Later on, Riggs confesses that he wants more out of their relationship, but Molly insists that Riggs must first resolve the issues with his father.
36	18	"Frankie Comes to Hollywood"	John Behring	David Fury	April 10, 2018	T13.20718	4.14
About 16 years ago, Frankie Kelso (Jude Ciccolella), a contract killer, decided to show mercy on Murtaugh after the latter tried to arrest him at the scene of a hit. In the present, Murtaugh notices Kelso's signature at the scene of another killing. He captures Kelso, but the latter is able to get the upper hand and take Murtaugh hostage. Kelso insists that he is retired and that someone framed him for the recent crime. Riggs recognizes the name of one of Kelso's mob connections as someone who spent time in prison with his father, Nathan (Rex Linn). Riggs then reluctantly contacts his father to get the information he needs to save Murtaugh. However, his action caused the mobs to declare war on Riggs' father by attacking him in prison.
37	19	"Leo Getz Hitched"	Nick Copus	Rob Wright	April 17, 2018	T13.20719	3.59
Leo is marrying Nina (Shakira Barrera), an ex-con, but she bails on the day of the wedding. Riggs and Murtaugh find her with a group of criminals trying to unload a bag of cocaine that "fell into" her purse at a high-stakes poker game run by a known mobster. At the same time, Riggs learns that Molly met with her ex-husband Jake, who is still a fugitive, and that Jake was at the same poker game. When Riggs catches up with Jake, the latter reveals he is planning to rob the safe at the poker game with two other conspirators. Elsewhere, Murtaugh is distraught over finding a positive pregnancy test in the trash can outside his home.
38	20	"Jesse's Girl"	Clayne Crawford	Seamus Kevin Fahey & Joe Smith	April 24, 2018	T13.20720	4.28
A break-in at a mansion turns deadly, and Roger and Trish are surprised to learn that Riana may be involved. It turns out that Phoebe, the sister of Riana's new boyfriend Jesse (Daniel DiVenere), is in possession of stolen diamonds from the heist and has become a target. Meanwhile, Riggs tries to be a good father figure for Ben, as he recalls the things he and Molly discussed in their teen years.
39	21	"Family Ties"	Nick Copus	Alex Taub	May 1, 2018	T13.20721	3.09
With Avery away at a conference, Murtaugh is appointed interim captain. His first case involves the kidnapping of Lisa Conlon, wife of a pharmaceutical magnate. Riggs is forced to get his father involved when it is revealed that the Aryan Fraternity of Texas (AFT) is behind the crime. In the process, Riggs learns that he has a 19-year-old half-brother, Garrett (Peter Coventry Smith), who is assisting the AFT. In exchange for his help, Riggs's father is let out of prison early. His comments to Riggs suggest that he plotted the whole kidnapping to get an early release. Meanwhile, Commissioner Debra tells Murtaugh that he is being promoted to full-time captain, as Avery will not be returning.
40	22	"One Day More"	Steve Boyum	Matt Miller & Katie Varney	May 8, 2018	T13.20722	3.15
While Murtaugh visits Riggs, the latter's trailer is shot up by two men on motorcycles. The investigation leads back to Grant Davenport where Riggs and Murtaugh discover that Riggs' father is the former's bodyguard. Later on, a suspect tells Riggs that Murtaugh was the target of the shootout and Trish's senior partner in her workplace has been laundering money for the AFT. Riggs' father immediately kidnaps Trish. Riggs and Murtaugh release Riggs's half-brother, Garrett, to exchange him for Trish. During the exchange, Murtaugh manages to save Trish, Riggs kills his father and Garrett escapes. Afterwards, during a celebration party, Riggs tells Trish that he is moving back to Texas with Molly and Ben. However, as Riggs makes one last visit to his wife's grave, Garrett shows up and fatally shoots him in the chest. This was the final appearance of Clayne Crawford as Martin Riggs.

=== Season 3 (2018–2019) ===
No. overall	No. in season	Title	Directed by	Written by	Original release date	Prod. code	U.S. viewers (millions)
41	1	"In the Same Boat"	Nick Copus	Matt Miller & Joe Smith	September 25, 2018	T13.21301	3.43
Following a harrowing experience in Afghanistan, a war veteran Wesley Cole (Seann William Scott) finds himself working for the LAPD issuing parking tickets as a way to get closer to his daughter and estranged ex-wife. A chance encounter with Chechnyan mobsters pairs Cole with Murtaugh, who is still reeling from Riggs's death and is considering retirement. Following the successful capture of the criminals, Cole learns that Murtaugh recommended him for the position of homicide detective. This was the first appearance of Seann William Scott as Wesley Cole.
42	2	"Need to Know"	Claudia Yarmy	Alex Taub	October 2, 2018	T13.21302	3.15
Murtaugh thinks partnering with Cole was a mistake after they are tasked to work with the FBI regarding a case involving the Sureños. While wrapped up in his own problems, Roger forgets that Trish is still dealing with post-traumatic issues from her capture at the hands of Riggs's father. Meanwhile, Cole learns that his ex-wife is in a relationship with Andrew (Jonathan Sadowski), an anesthesiologist, which burdens him seeing that her and his daughter have moved on.
43	3	"A Whole Lotto Trouble"	Steve Boyum	Kyle Warren	October 9, 2018	T13.21303	2.94
Murtaugh and Cole stumble upon a lotto scam, in which the benefactors are being targeted by a criminal group. Natalie allows Cole to spend a day with their daughter, who sees a bit too much when Cole takes her to work. Meanwhile, Roger has to deal with his condescending father-in-law (Richard Roundtree), a retired federal judge who is visiting.
44	4	"Leo Getz Justice"	Nick Copus	Ariana Jackson	October 16, 2018	T13.21304	2.86
Cole thinks about his service at the CIA when he gets an unexpected visit from a past figure; Murtaugh has difficulties with his own mistakes after a new murder puts doubts on a suspect he imprisoned in the past; Leo Getz comes back as an attorney.
45	5	"Get the Picture"	Rob Bailey	Bill Callahan	October 30, 2018	T13.21305	2.67
Cole and Murtaugh investigate a truck that was full of fine art until robbers attacked it. Cole struggles with his feelings for Natalie after discovering that Andrew is planning to propose to her. During the investigation, Cole develops a relationship with the mind behind the robbery, Layla Khudari (Annet Mahendru), who disguised herself as an employee of the art owner. Meanwhile, Riana deceptively convinces Murtaugh to let her attend a concert after discovering that her father is still keeping his boat.
46	6	"Panama"	Keesha Sharp	Seamus Kevin Fahey	November 6, 2018	T13.21306	3.03
Cole and Murtaugh investigate a deposit box robbery. Later on, he and Murtaugh cross paths with Cole's former mentor, Tom Barnes (Mykelti Williamson). Meanwhile, Murtaugh butts heads with Trish's new client and asks for Bailey's help to investigate her. Cole remembers a target from one of his past missions as he joins Barnes to eliminate a rogue CIA agent. When Sofia Vasquez, the wife of the target he killed appeared, everything goes awry and he is forced to kill the rogue agent. Afterwards, Murtaugh discovers that Trish's new client is an undercover cop, who becomes Bailey's new partner. At the same time, Cole is captured by Vasquez.
47	7	"Bali"	Rob Bailey	Katie Varney & Eileen Jones	November 13, 2018	T13.21307	2.79
In Murtaugh's home, Riana tries to convince her parents to let her go on a date. Meanwhile, Vasquez and her Cartel captured Cole and buries him alive, which prompting Murtaugh to ask for Barnes's assistance. On Barnes's suggestion, Murtaugh secretly released Vasquez's former lieutenant, Benny Alvila, in exchange for information. After Cole is rescued, he deduces Barnes' schemes regarding Alvila. Cole incapacitates Murtaugh before leaving to stop Alvila, but the latter manages to recover while also catching Riana sneaking out with his car. After Cole and Murtaugh managed to hinder Barnes' plan of using Alvila to kill Vasquez, Cole confronts Barnes about his actions. Later on, Cole reveals his true feelings to Natalie and she reciprocates by kissing him.
48	8	"What the Puck"	April Mullen	Norman Morrill	November 27, 2018	T13.21308	3.00
A car bomb is set off outside a restaurant a witness named Elliott works at, but he is not killed. Elliott is helping to build a case against a Tony Corsetti. Murtaugh & Cole are tasked to watch Elliott, but Cole goes to find Tony at the restaurant. When he gets there, someone has killed Tony leading Cole, who takes Erica and her car, on a high-speed car chase. Natalie has not told Andrew about when her and Cole kissed recently. Cole hopes to meet with Natalie in order to talk about their relationship, but is interrupted by an encounter with a new assistant district attorney named Erica, who he rear-ended. Murtaugh makes an unexpected friend after he is kicked out of the house for a girls' night. Andrew finds out about Cole & Natalie's kiss, and is mad at Cole. Cole implies that Andrew should still propose to Natalie. Andrew does propose to Natalie at a Kings hockey game, and she says yes.
49	9	"Bad Santas"	John Behring	Alex Taub	December 4, 2018	T13.21309	2.89
A young Cole, in the year 1993 in Slovakia, gets beat up by another boy at school for not knowing the language. He gets comforted by his mother. Maya is spending Christmas with Cole. Murtaugh wants to throw a party for RJ coming home from Costa Rica. Two house burglars are interrupted by the homeowners. The wife shoots one of the burglars with a shotgun. Cole recognizes the dead burglar by the tattoo on his neck. Cole saw him talking to a friend of his, Oscar, who is an ex-con, at the hotel he lives in. Cole and Murtaugh go to search Oscar's room at the hotel when he shows up. Oscar tries to flee only to crash into Cole's room. Bailey and Luisa get assigned a case for a chopped-up jogger.
50	10	"There Will Be Bud"	Nathan Hope	Bill Callahan	January 1, 2019	T13.21310	3.38
Cole finds himself on the rebound after Natalie's engagement; Murtaugh worries about the connection between the murder he's investigating and an opportunity for Trish to serve as co-counsel on a high-profile lawsuit with Leo Getz.
51	11	"Dial M for Murtaugh"	Jay Chandrasekhar	Kyle Warren	January 8, 2019	T13.21311	3.23
We open with Murtaugh being interrogated. The Murtaugh family goes on a vacation to a resort. Turns out Cole is also being interrogated! Cole is working cases with Erica, the new D.A. Erica's mom, who is a Senator, is in town. Cole starts working a murder case while Murtaugh is on vacation. Murtaugh throws his back out while on vacation and starts spying on people within the resort hotel with his camera.
52	12	"The Roger and Me"	Eric Laneuville	Ariana Jackson & Joe Smith	January 15, 2019	T13.21312	3.07
Murtaugh is giving a speech at the police academy telling a story back in 2007 about him and Avery, while exaggerating a bit about the story making himself look good. Cole and Erica are in bed together. Maya is dropped off causing Erica to leave. A man named Mark Hardy is killed participating in an underground fight club, but his body was moved to a gym owned by his brother. Cole and Roger are sent to investigate. Mark Hardy was given a sedative right before his fight. Trish Murtaugh is presented with an opportunity to run for District Attorney.
53	13	"Coyote Ugly"	Matt Barber	Seamus Kevin Fahey	February 12, 2019	T13.21313	3.11
When Cole and Murtaugh investigate a case involving a father and daughter (illegally) crossing the Mexican border, they end up uncovering a major issue with California Border Patrol. Meanwhile, Trish prepares her campaign for D.A. and must face parts of her past, before they find their way into the media spotlight. Cole also confronts his past when he experiences flashbacks as a result of an injury.
54	14	"A Game of Chicken"	Eric Laneuville	Alex Taub & Felicia Hilario	February 19, 2019	T13.21314	3.24
Against Murtaugh's advice, Cole reaches out to Tom Barnes to help with a case that hits close to home, putting Murtaugh and Cole's partnership to the test. Meanwhile, Trish prepares to announce her campaign for District Attorney.
55	15	"The Spy Who Loved Me"	Nick Copus	Matt Miller & Eileen Jones	February 26, 2019	T13.21315	3.06
Cole is investigated by the FBI, forcing Murtaugh to question his loyalty to his own partner; Cole works a case that puts Natalie's fiancé into the cross-hairs right before their wedding day.

== Ratings ==
=== Season 1 ===
Viewership and ratings per episode of List of Lethal Weapon episodes
No.	Title	Air date	Rating/share (18–49)	Viewers (millions)	DVR (18–49)	DVR viewers (millions)	Total (18–49)	Total viewers (millions)
1	"Pilot"	September 21, 2016	2.2/8	7.93	1.0	3.16	3.2	11.09
2	"Surf N Turf"	September 28, 2016	2.0/8	7.23	0.8	2.68	2.8	9.91
3	"Best Buds"	October 5, 2016	1.7/6	6.62	0.9	2.62	2.6	9.24
4	"There Goes the Neighborhood"	October 12, 2016	1.9/7	6.84	0.9	—N/a	2.8	—N/a
5	"Spilt Milk"	October 19, 2016	1.7/6	6.66	0.9	2.81	2.6	9.47
6	"Ties That Bind"	November 9, 2016	1.8/6	7.02	0.8	2.62	2.6	9.64
7	"Fashion Police"	November 16, 2016	1.7/6	6.60	0.8	2.64	2.5	9.25
8	"Can I Get a Witness?"	November 30, 2016	1.6/6	6.43	0.8	2.75	2.4	9.17
9	"Jingle Bell Glock"	December 7, 2016	1.4/5	6.26	0.8	2.75	2.2	9.00
10	"Homebodies"	January 4, 2017	1.5/5	6.30	0.8	2.82	2.3	9.03
11	"Lawmen"	January 11, 2017	1.4/5	6.48	0.7	2.40	2.1	8.88
12	"Brotherly Love"	January 18, 2017	1.4/5	6.29	0.8	2.54	2.2	8.83
13	"The Seal is Broken"	January 25, 2017	1.4/5	6.28	0.8	2.70	2.2	8.98
14	"The Murtaugh File"	February 8, 2017	1.3/5	6.25	—N/a	2.44	—N/a	8.69
15	"As Good As It Getz"	February 15, 2017	1.4/5	6.37	0.7	2.52	2.1	8.89
16	"Unnecessary Roughness"	February 22, 2017	1.4/5	6.26	0.7	2.57	2.1	8.83
17	"A Problem Like Maria"	March 8, 2017	1.2/5	5.93	0.7	2.36	1.9	8.28
18	"Commencement"	March 15, 2017	1.3/5	6.02	0.7	2.55	2.0	8.57

=== Season 2 ===
Viewership and ratings per episode of List of Lethal Weapon episodes
No.	Title	Air date	Rating/share (18–49)	Viewers (millions)	DVR (18–49)	DVR viewers (millions)	Total (18–49)	Total viewers (millions)
1	"El Gringo Loco"	September 26, 2017	1.2/5	4.37	—N/a	2.75	—N/a	7.12
2	"Dancing in September"	October 3, 2017	1.1/4	4.10	—N/a	2.66	—N/a	6.76
3	"Born to Run"	October 10, 2017	1.0/4	3.89	—N/a	2.59	—N/a	6.48
4	"Flight Risk"	October 17, 2017	0.9/4	3.79	—N/a	2.63	—N/a	6.42
5	"Let it Ride"	November 7, 2017	1.0/4	4.06	0.7	2.76	1.7	6.81
6	"Gold Rush"	November 14, 2017	1.0/4	3.84	—N/a	2.54	—N/a	6.40
7	"Birdwatching"	November 21, 2017	1.0/4	3.86	0.6	2.53	1.6	6.39
8	"Fork-Getta-Bout-It"	November 28, 2017	1.0/4	4.89	0.7	2.44	1.7	7.34
9	"Fools Rush In"	December 5, 2017	1.0/4	4.50	0.7	2.45	1.7	6.95
10	"Wreck the Halls"	December 12, 2017	1.0/4	4.08	—N/a	—N/a	—N/a	—N/a
11	"Funny Money"	January 2, 2018	1.1/4	4.55	—N/a	—N/a	—N/a	—N/a
12	"Diggin' Up Dirt"	January 9, 2018	1.0/4	4.26	0.7	2.70	1.7	6.95
13	"Better Living Through Chemistry"	January 16, 2018	1.2/4	5.03	—N/a	2.47	—N/a	7.50
14	"Double Shot of Baileys"	January 23, 2018	1.2/4	4.55	0.6	2.67	1.8	7.22
15	"An Inconvenient Ruth"	February 6, 2018	1.1/4	4.35	0.7	2.80	1.8	7.15
16	"Ruthless"	February 27, 2018	1.0/4	4.13	0.6	2.68	1.6	6.81
17	"The Odd Couple"	March 6, 2018	0.9/4	4.00	0.6	2.48	1.5	6.48
18	"Frankie Comes to Town"	April 10, 2018	0.9/4	4.14	0.6	2.36	1.5	6.50
19	"Leo Getz Hitched"	April 17, 2018	0.8/3	3.59	0.6	2.44	1.4	6.02
20	"Jesse's Girl"	April 24, 2018	0.9/4	4.28	0.6	2.10	1.5	6.38
21	"Family Ties"	May 1, 2018	0.7/3	3.09	0.6	2.42	1.3	5.50
22	"One Day More"	May 8, 2018	0.8/4	3.15	0.5	2.34	1.3	5.49

=== Season 3 ===
Viewership and ratings per episode of List of Lethal Weapon episodes
No.	Title	Air date	Rating/share (18–49)	Viewers (millions)	DVR (18–49)	DVR viewers (millions)	Total (18–49)	Total viewers (millions)
1	"In the Same Boat"	September 25, 2018	0.8/3	3.43	0.7	2.86	1.5	6.29
2	"Need to Know"	October 2, 2018	0.8/3	3.15	0.5	2.52	1.3	5.67
3	"A Whole Lotto Trouble"	October 9, 2018	0.7/3	2.94	0.6	2.60	1.3	5.54
4	"Leo Getz Justice"	October 16, 2018	0.7/3	2.86	0.6	2.66	1.3	5.52
5	"Get the Picture"	October 30, 2018	0.6/3	2.67	0.5	2.45	1.1	5.12
6	"Panama"	November 6, 2018	0.7/3	3.03	0.6	2.47	1.3	5.49
7	"Bali"	November 13, 2018	0.6/3	2.79	0.6	2.31	1.2	5.10
8	"What the Puck"	November 27, 2018	0.7/3	3.00	0.5	2.33	1.2	5.33
9	"Bad Santas"	December 4, 2018	0.7/3	2.89	0.6	2.36	1.3	5.26
10	"There Will Be Bud"	January 1, 2019	0.7/3	3.38	0.5	2.04	1.2	5.42
11	"Dial M for Murtaugh"	January 8, 2019	0.7/3	3.23	0.5	2.03	1.2	5.26
12	"The Roger and Me"	January 15, 2019	0.7/3	3.07	0.5	2.21	1.2	5.29
13	"Coyote Ugly"	February 12, 2019	0.7/3	3.11	0.5	2.13	1.2	5.24
14	"A Game of Chicken"	February 19, 2019	0.8/4	3.24	0.4	2.09	1.2	5.33
15	"The Spy Who Loved Me"	February 26, 2019	0.7/3	3.06	0.5	2.07	1.2	5.13

Lethal Weapon : U.S. viewers per episode (millions)

Season	Episode number																					
Season	1	2	3	4	5	6	7	8	9	10	11	12	13	14	15	16	17	18	19	20	21	22
1	7.93	7.23	6.62	6.84	6.66	7.02	6.60	6.43	6.26	6.30	6.48	6.29	6.28	6.25	6.37	6.26	5.93	6.02	–			
2	4.37	4.10	3.89	3.79	4.06	3.84	3.86	4.89	4.50	4.08	4.55	4.26	5.03	4.55	4.35	4.13	4.00	4.14	3.59	4.28	3.09	3.15
3	3.43	3.15	2.94	2.86	2.67	3.03	2.79	3.00	2.89	3.38	3.23	3.07	3.11	3.24	3.06	–						

Audience measurement performed by Nielsen Media Research
