= Lethal Weapon (video game) =

1992 video game

- Developers: Ocean Software; Eurocom (NES/Game Boy)
- Publishers: Ocean Software; Nintendo (Arcade)
- Composers: Neil Baldwin (NES); Jeroen Tel (SMS); Barry Leitch (Amiga)
- Platforms: Arcade, Amiga, Atari ST, Commodore 64, MS-DOS, Game Boy, NES, Super NES
- Release: 1992, 1993 (NES/Game Boy)
- Genre: Action
- Mode: Single-player

Lethal Weapon is a video game based on the film series of the same name created by Shane Black. It was developed by Ocean Software and Eurocom. It was released in 1992 and 1993 by Ocean and Nintendo. It was released in conjunction with Lethal Weapon 3, the third installment of the series.

== NES and Game Boy version ==
Lethal Weapon is a side-scroller, in which the player chooses one of the two Los Angeles police partners from the film series, Martin Riggs or Roger Murtaugh, and battles it out with criminals around the city. Battles are resolved via fists, guns and grenades. It is considered by gaming enthusiasts to be extremely difficult and frustrating in the fact that punching an enemy is more effective than shooting an enemy. However, the NES version is praised for its colorful graphics for 1992, and both versions of the game are universally praised for the music by Neil Baldwin.

== Arcade and Super NES version ==
There was another version of the game released for the day's arcade formats and the Super Nintendo Entertainment System. It also is a difficult side-scroller where the user plays as either Riggs or Murtaugh and has to complete four missions in order to go on to the fifth and final mission. There is little difference between the two characters, other than Riggs having a faster rate of fire for his handgun, but at the cost of having a low jump height, while Murtaugh has a higher jump height at the cost of a low rate of fire for his handgun. The first four missions have the player trying to do things such as rescue their friend Leo Getz, defuse a bomb in a shopping mall, stop a dockside smuggling operation, and prevent terrorists from blowing up the city's sewer system. The final mission focuses on going after Jack Travis, the main villain of Lethal Weapon 3.

== Unreleased Master System version ==
A Master System version was in development by Probe Software and supposed to be released alongside the various versions of the game, however, for unknown reasons, it was unreleased to the public. No ROM or any evidence of the game is known to exist online, aside from the music by Jeroen Tel.

== Amiga, Atari ST, MS-DOS Version ==
The Amiga, Atari ST, and MS-DOS version was developed by Ocean and released in 1992. It is broadly similar to the game on Arcade and SNES, but features unique levels and different gameplay mechanics.

== Commodore 64 Version ==
The Commodore 64 version was developed by Ocean and released in 1992. In this version Riggs or Murtaugh can only be selected at the beginning, the game is linear instead of allowing players to select their missions, and most importantly the levels were redesigned.

== Reception ==
Reception

Aggregate score
Aggregator	Score
GameRankings	62% (SNES)

Super Gamer Magazine gave the SNES version a review score of 68%.
