= Lethal Weapon 4 =

1998 American film directed by Richard Donner

- Theatrical release poster
- Directed by: Richard Donner
- Screenplay by: Channing Gibson
- Story by: Jonathan Lemkin; Alfred Gough; Miles Millar
- Based on: Characters by Shane Black
- Produced by: Richard Donner; Joel Silver
- Starring: Mel Gibson; Danny Glover; Joe Pesci; Rene Russo; Chris Rock; Jet Li
- Cinematography: Andrzej Bartkowiak
- Edited by: Dallas Puett; Kevin Stitt; Frank J. Urioste
- Music by: Michael Kamen; Eric Clapton; David Sanborn
- Production companies: Silver Pictures; Doshudo Productions
- Distributed by: Warner Bros.
- Release date: July 10, 1998
- Running time: 127 minutes
- Country: United States
- Language: English
- Budget: $100–150 million
- Box office: $285.4 million

Lethal Weapon 4 is a 1998 American buddy cop action film directed and produced by Richard Donner, and starring Mel Gibson, Danny Glover, Joe Pesci, Rene Russo, Chris Rock, and Jet Li (in his international film debut). The sequel to the 1992 film, Lethal Weapon 3, it is the fourth and final installment in the Lethal Weapon film series. It is the last film in the series directed by Donner before his death in 2021, and the latest to be released theatrically.

The film was released by Warner Bros. on July 10, 1998. The film received mixed reviews from critics and grossed $285 million worldwide, becoming the tenth highest-grossing film of 1998.

A fifth film, with Glover and Gibson set to reprise their roles as Riggs and Murtaugh, has languished in development hell since 2007.

== Plot ==
Lorna Cole is pregnant with LAPD Sergeant Martin Riggs's baby; they are not married, but both are thinking about it. LAPD Sergeant Roger Murtaugh's daughter Rianne is also pregnant but will not reveal who the father is.

The officers and Leo Getz come upon a Chinese immigrant smuggling ring after running an oceangoing vessel aground, though the boat's captain escapes. After witnessing an INS agent callously send those found back to China, Murtaugh finds the Hong family hiding to avoid deportation. Murtaugh offers them shelter in his home, and their families, along with Riggs and Cole, bond. Grandfather Hong is looking for his uncle, a skilled engraver, who had paid for their passage to the US. Riggs discovers through Lorna that the father of Rianne's unborn child is Detective Lee Butters, with the family hiding this from Murtaugh, who would not approve of his daughter being with a police officer.

Continued investigation of the smuggling ring leads the officers to "Uncle" Benny Chan, a crime boss operating from a Chinatown restaurant. There, they are introduced to high-ranking Triad negotiator Wah Sing Ku. Chan forces them out of his restaurant when the officers show no probable cause. Riggs pulls the fire alarm so the sprinklers go off, forcing all the restaurant customers to flee. Outside, Riggs spots the ship captain and tries to give chase but fails to capture him. Ku later intercepts the captain and kills him as punishment for attracting police attention.

Hong manages to contact his uncle, but this leads the Triads to Murtaugh's house. Ku and the Triad assassins kidnap the Hongs, tie up Murtaugh, his family, Riggs, and Cole and set the house ablaze. Ping, Hong's grandson, has evaded capture and helps to free the others in time. Although Riggs and Murtaugh chase down and kill the Triad members, Ku escapes. He then brings Mr. Hong to his uncle at a warehouse, where he has been engraving plates for a counterfeiting operation for Ku and Chan in exchange for transit for his family. Ku kills Hong in front of his uncle to assure his continued work.

With Getz serving as a distraction, the officers confront Chan at his dentist's office to interrogate him with laughing gas for more leads, obtaining some information about the so called Four Fathers. Laughing gas also causes Riggs and Butters to accidentally reveal the family secret to Murtaugh. Later, they discuss what they know with Detective Ng, who has worked on cases involving the Chinese government before. He recognizes that Ku must be trying to negotiate with a corrupt Chinese general for the release of the Four Fathers, high-ranking Triad members that include Ku's brother.

New information leads them to the abandoned warehouse where they find the bodies of Hong, his uncle, and Chan, the latter two killed by Ku after they served their usefulness. Knowing that Ku plans to use counterfeit money, the police intercept the exchange between Ku and the general, telling the general that the money is fake. The enraged general executes most of the Four Fathers before being executed by the Triad. Then a massive firefight breaks out between the Triad, the general's private army, and the police; most of the Triad and army are killed, and Butters is wounded while shielding Murtaugh. Ku attempts to escape with his brother, who is killed by Murtaugh. Riggs and Murtaugh then pursue him to a pier and engage him in a brutal fistfight. Murtaugh impales Ku through the stomach with a rebar before being knocked out by him. The pier then collapses, sending Riggs and Ku into the water. Riggs finds an assault rifle and kills him, while Murtaugh recovers in time to rescue Riggs from a piece of concrete that had pinned him underwater.

Riggs and Getz later discover that Lorna is about to give birth and race to the hospital, where Riggs and Lorna are symbolically married by a rabbi just before she enters labor. Their son Billy and Rianne's daughter Victoria are born, and Murtaugh accepts Butters as his son-in-law whilst Hong's family is granted asylum.

== Cast ==
- Mel Gibson as Martin Riggs
- Danny Glover as Roger Murtaugh
- Joe Pesci as Leo Getz
- Rene Russo as Lorna Cole
- Chris Rock as Lee Butters
- Jet Li as Wah Sing Ku
- Steve Kahan as Captain Ed Murphy
- Kim Chan as Uncle Benny Chan
- Darlene Love as Trish Murtaugh
- Traci Wolfe as Rianne Murtaugh
- Eddy Ko as Hong
- Jack Kehler as the State Department official
- Calvin Jung as Detective Ng

In addition, series regulars – who appear in minor roles in all four films of the franchise – include: Damon Hines and Ebonie Smith as Murtaugh children Nick and Carrie, respectively; and Mary Ellen Trainor as psychologist Stephanie Woods.

== Production ==
In early 1993, after the release of Lethal Weapon 3, Warner Bros. and producer Joel Silver tried buying a new spec script titled Simon Says in hopes of rewriting it into a script for Lethal Weapon 4. Written by Jonathan Hensleigh, the story was about a police detective and a shop owner forced to find and stop bombs planted all over a city as part of a mad bomber's revenge plot against the detective.

However, 20th Century Fox purchased the script first, planning a project for Brandon Lee's next film after The Crow. It was considered for a standalone film or to be re-written into a sequel to his 1992 action film, Rapid Fire, when Lee was killed during filming on The Crow. Fox would then use the script as the basis for a third Die Hard film they were having trouble developing. After many rewrites by several writers, it was finally made into Die Hard With a Vengeance (1995).

In July 1993, Warner Bros. and Silver started working on not just the fourth Lethal Weapon film but a fifth as well. Screenwriter and script doctor Jonathan Lemkin, who had just done some uncredited work for them on Demolition Man (1993), was hired to write the script for Lethal Weapon 4 while another writer worked on the script for Lethal Weapon 5. According to Silver, the plan was to shoot both films back-to-back, with the possibility of using the best parts of both scripts for a single film.

In June 1994, Richard Donner was still planning on making both films. Asked about them in an interview at the time, however, Mel Gibson said he was not interested in doing any more Lethal Weapon sequels.

Between late 1994 and early 1995, screenwriter Jeffrey Boam was brought in to rewrite the script for the fourth film. Boam had previously done uncredited work on the first Lethal Weapon, rewrote an original script by Shane Black and Warren Murphy called Play Dirty into Lethal Weapon 2, and wrote the story and script for Lethal Weapon 3. He was initially unsure of working on the film, as he had problems with the script and following a bad experience on the third film: he had to keep rewriting that script all through filming and was fired at one point only to be rehired later. Agreeing to work on the fourth script, he tossed out the existing story and began work on his own. His first draft was completed in January 1995, focusing on Riggs and Murtaugh fighting neo-Nazi survivalists committing terrorist attacks on L.A., including using Stinger missiles to attempt to shoot down a jet carrying the Los Angeles Lakers. He said in an interview at the time that he would probably have to write at least three more drafts. By October 1995, Boam was still working on the script, while at the same time also working on a fourth Indiana Jones film which went unproduced.

Peter Bart's book The Gross: The Hits, The Flops -- The Summer That Ate Hollywood offered many details regarding Lethal Weapon 4's troubled production, from writing to release. While Boam was still working on his version of the story, other writers were brought in to pen their own versions, all of which were rejected. Though many were positive on the darker, edgier, more serious tone of Boam's script that recalled the first film, it was ultimately rejected because of the tone. Finally, Warner Bros. decided that they wanted to focus on a storyline involving the Chinese Triads. Boam would later say he felt that the main plot about counterfeiting Chinese money was not a good or suspenseful enough plot for a Lethal Weapon sequel.

Jonathan Lemkin was once again brought in to write the first version of the script involving the Triads, about four years after he wrote his first rejected script. Although his new script was received very positively, Warner Bros. again had other writers work on their own versions of the story. Alfred Gough and Miles Millar wrote one of the unused scripts; they would be credited with Lemkin for the story of the finished film.

Silver ultimately brought in TV writer Channing Gibson to work on the script, after he was impressed by Gibson's rewrite of a spec script titled Sandblast, an action adventure thriller by screenwriter Steven Maeda described as "Die Hard (1988) meets Cliffhanger (1993)". Gibson took the gig thinking it would be a more relaxed writing job than anything he did for TV. However, much like the previous two sequels, the script kept getting changed and rewritten over and over again. Gibson would end up doing more work and revisions on it than on all of his TV work put together. Production even started with only half of the script. The ending was not written until it was finally time to film it.

The characters of Leo Getz and Lee Butters were not in the original scripts. Joe Pesci was hired and paid $1 million for three weeks of work, forcing rewrites. Gibson was "three-fourths" through his newest draft when Chris Rock was hired, which caused yet another rewrite. Butters was originally written to be a homosexual detective. When they started filming the police station scene between Riggs, Murtaugh, Leo, and Butters, everyone felt the character did not work. He was changed to be Rianne's husband and father to her unborn child. The two only share one scene in the final film with no written dialogue, due to last minute changes made to his character.

Besides Lemkin, Gibson, Gough and Millar, other writers did uncredited work on the script, including Michael Curtis, Greg Malins, Fred Dekker (who came up with the scene where Riggs and Murtaugh drive their car off the freeway and through the building), and even Boam was brought in to work on the script.

The film entered production in early January 1998 with a planned summer release of that same year. Due to issues during filming, including the script changes, production ended around mid May, less than two months before its scheduled July release. Editors had to work very quickly to have the film ready, which is why the trailers feature some deleted and alternate scenes which are not in the film. Despite this, the film was finished and released as planned. For the film, Gibson, Glover, Donner, and Silver had first-dollar gross deals, equivalent to at least 35 cents of every dollar earned.

== Release ==
=== Box office ===
Lethal Weapon 4 debuted at No. 1 at the box office ahead of Armageddon and Small Soldiers with $34.05 million. The film would hold the record for having the highest July opening weekend for a Warner Bros. film until The Perfect Storm surpassed it in 2000. In its second weekend, it was overtaken by The Mask of Zorro, making $21.7 million and outgrossing fourth place newcomer There's Something About Mary. Although the film grossed $130 million in the U.S., it was not considered a runaway financial success as the previous three films had been.

Shooting began in January 1998, just months before the film's release, with a production budget estimated at $120–$150 million (although Warner Bros. Pictures maintained it cost less than $100 million) and an additional $50 million spent on marketing and distribution. This made the fourth film the most expensive entry of the series. Its profit margin was saved in part due to the combined foreign box office sales making the film gross approximately $285 million in total, making the second highest-grossing film in the Lethal Weapon film series behind, Lethal Weapon 3 (1992). Still, like its predecessors, Lethal Weapon 4 was among the top ten grossing films of its release year.

=== Critical reception ===
On the review aggregator website Rotten Tomatoes, 54% of 69 critics' reviews are positive, with an average rating of 5.9/10. The website's consensus reads: "Jet Li's arrival breathes fresh life into a tired franchise formula -- but not enough to put Lethal Weapon 4 on equal footing with its predecessors." Metacritic, which uses a weighted average, assigned the film a score of 37 out of 100, based on 21 critics, indicating "generally unfavorable" reviews.

James Berardinelli gave the film three stars out of four, writing: "Given the expectations that constrain it, Lethal Weapon 4 is probably the best motion picture that could possibly result from another teaming of Martin Riggs and Roger Murtaugh. The series has lost a lot of steam since the first two entries, and, although the fourth movie ratchets up the energy level from the moribund state of the disappointing Lethal Weapon 3, there's no sense of spontaneity."

Roger Ebert gave Lethal Weapon 4 two stars out of four, writing: "Lethal Weapon 4 has all the technical skill of the first three movies in the series, but lacks the secret weapon, which was conviction. All four movies take two cop buddies and put them into spectacular and absurd action sequences, but the first three at least went through the motions of taking the plot seriously (and the first one did such a good job, it made my 'best 10' list of that year). This time, we're watching an exercise."

Michael O'Sullivan of The Washington Post called it a "stupid and violent delicacy" that balances a "patented blend of high action and low comedy".

The film was nominated for a Razzie Award for Worst Supporting Actor for Pesci.

=== Home media ===
Lethal Weapon 4 has been released on VHS and DVD numerous times. It has been re-released in numerous sets that contain all four films in the series. Lethal Weapon 4 was released on Blu-ray Disc as part of a box set with the additional Lethal Weapon films on May 22, 2012.

== Soundtrack ==
The film's music was composed by Michael Kamen, Eric Clapton, and David Sanborn. This was the only film in the series not to have a soundtrack album released alongside it but, in 2013, La-La Land Records released the score as discs seven and eight of its limited edition Lethal Weapon: Soundtrack Collection. Just as Martin Riggs has been represented in the entire franchise by a guitar, and Roger Murtaugh by a saxophone, Lee Butters is accompanied by a harmonica.

== Sequel ==
There had long been talk of a fifth Lethal Weapon film, although both Mel Gibson and Danny Glover had initially expressed a lack of interest. In 2007, Moviehole.net received word from sources that Warner Bros. were in the early stages of trying to relaunch the Lethal Weapon series sometime in 2009 or later. A spec script treatment was written by Shane Black and Chuck Mondry, leading to rumors that the sequel was on fast track by Warner Bros. with Black in the director's chair. In 2008, Richard Donner said, "Mel turned it down. I would like to think that Mel turned it down because I wasn't involved." Donner said that he and Lethal Weapon 4 writer Channing Gibson "had an incredibly strong story for the fifth movie" but that the studio had opted to work with Joel Silver instead.

In November 2017, Mel Gibson hinted that a fifth movie might happen and that he, Richard Donner, and Danny Glover have discussed the idea to return. In December 2017, Donner confirmed in an interview on the Spocklight podcast that Gibson and Glover have agreed to return as Riggs and Murtaugh respectively and that he has a story all set. The only obstacle is Warner Bros. greenlighting the film. Channing Gibson remains involved as screenwriter. The story will take place in the present-day and is intended to be the final film in the series. In February 2018, Donner revealed the film's official title to be Lethal Finale; while also stating that the film is being held up by the production company and story. In January 2020, producer Dan Lin confirmed that Lethal Weapon 5 is in active development, with Mel Gibson and Danny Glover confirmed to return, and Richard Donner returning to direct, but that a script had not yet been finalized. In December 2020, Richard Donner confirmed that he was developing the sequel and would produce and direct it, adding that it would be the last film he directs. However, Donner died on July 5, 2021, leaving the fate of the film unknown. Mel Gibson had been approached for potentially directing the film.

On November 15, 2021, Gibson confirmed that he was in talks to direct and star in the fifth Lethal Weapon film, saying that he would be helming the film to honor Donner. It was also revealed that Richard Wenk (The Equalizer, Jack Reacher: Never Go Back) had drafted a screenplay. The production would be exclusive to HBO Max with no theatrical release. Warner Bros. ultimately opted not to make the film despite a completed script, which Gibson later teased: "The characters are quite different. They’re older. One’s retired. The other one’s on a desk job. He’s putting on too much weight, and it’s low-tech. It doesn’t get into the big explosions and all this sort of stuff. But it still has the energy and, I think, drive of a big action film... it still has all the elements of what was in the other films, but not nearly so complicated. But it deals more about the people in it."
