= Lethal Weapon (franchise) =

American action-comedy media franchise

- Official franchise logo
- Created by: Shane Black
- Original work: Lethal Weapon
- Owners: Warner Bros. Pictures (Skydance)
- Years: 1987–present

Films and television
- Films: Lethal Weapon (1987); Lethal Weapon 2 (1989); Lethal Weapon 3 (1992); Lethal Weapon 4 (1998)
- Television series: Lethal Weapon (2016–2019)

Games
- Video game: Lethal Weapon (1992)

Miscellaneous
- Theme park attraction: Lethal Weapon – The Ride (1995–2012)
- Pinball: Lethal Weapon 3 (1992)

Lethal Weapon is an American buddy cop action-comedy media franchise created by Shane Black and owned by Warner Bros. Pictures. It focuses on two Los Angeles Police Department (LAPD) detectives, Martin Riggs and Roger Murtaugh. The franchise consists of a series of four films released between 1987 and 1998 and a television series which aired from 2016 to 2019. The four films were directed by Richard Donner and also share many of the same core cast members, while the television series is a reboot with different actors. Although the first film was not explicitly a comedy, the later films and the television series gradually became comedic in nature.

A proposed fifth installment had been in talks and development since 2007. The franchise generated $2 billion in box-office and merchandising revenue from 1987 to 1998.

== Films ==
| Film | U.S. release date | Director | Screenwriter(s) | Story by | Producers |
|---|---|---|---|---|---|
| Lethal Weapon | March 6, 1987 | Richard Donner | Shane Black | Shane Black | Richard Donner & Joel Silver |
| Lethal Weapon 2 | July 7, 1989 | Richard Donner | Jeffrey Boam | Shane Black & Warren Murphy | Richard Donner & Joel Silver |
| Lethal Weapon 3 | May 15, 1992 | Richard Donner | Jeffrey Boam & Robert Mark Kamen | Jeffrey Boam | Richard Donner & Joel Silver |
| Lethal Weapon 4 | July 10, 1998 | Richard Donner | Channing Gibson | Jonathan Lemkin & Alfred Gough and Miles Millar | Richard Donner & Joel Silver |

=== Lethal Weapon (1987) ===
Anxious with age and retirement, homicide detective Roger Murtaugh (Danny Glover) is partnered with young and suicidal narcotics officer Martin Riggs (Mel Gibson). Together, they work the case of the alleged suicide of Amanda Hunsaker (Jackie Swanson), daughter of a wealthy businessman who served with Murtaugh in Vietnam. Murtaugh and Riggs soon discover that Hunsaker was involved in a heroin-smuggling scheme led by a retired general (Mitchell Ryan) and his lead enforcer (Gary Busey).

=== Lethal Weapon 2 (1989) ===
During a car chase, Riggs and Murtaugh stumble upon a trunk full of smuggled South African Krugerrands. This sparks a series of attempts at their lives, forcing them to take a less dangerous case, protecting Leo Getz (Joe Pesci), a loud-mouthed whistleblower with whom they gradually bond and befriend. However, they realize that Getz was involved in the same South African illegal activities. As a result, the three men become entangled in a drug-smuggling operation involving South African diplomats in Los Angeles, using their immunity as a shield. Riggs kills the murderer of his girlfriend, who is among the criminals.

=== Lethal Weapon 3 (1992) ===
As Murtaugh, who is one week from retiring, and Riggs investigate a robbery committed using a duplicate armored car, they find themselves in the middle of an Internal Affairs investigation led by Sergeant Lorna Cole (Rene Russo). With assistance from Leo, they learn that the subject of the investigation is a rogue cop (Stuart Wilson) who is stealing impounded weapons and selling them on the black market. During the investigation, Murtaugh shoots and kills a teenager who attacks him and Riggs; he turns out to be a friend of his own son. This prompts Murtaugh to capture the man responsible for the distribution of illegal firearms and to rethink his retirement.

=== Lethal Weapon 4 (1998) ===
While his girlfriend Lorna and Murtaugh’s daughter Rianne are both pregnant, Riggs again teams up with Murtaugh and Leo as well as rookie Detective Lee Butters (Chris Rock) to investigate a Chinese immigrant smuggling ring. Wah Sing Ku (Jet Li) is a ruthless enforcer who attempts to murder Murtaugh's family by burning them alive in their home. Murtaugh discovers that Butters is the father of his daughter's unborn child. The two kill dozens of Chinese gangsters and catch up with the boss of the smuggling ring. Riggs and Lorna are married at the end of the film as their child is born.

=== Proposed fifth film ===
Since 2007, there had long been talk of a fifth Lethal Weapon film, although both Mel Gibson and Danny Glover initially expressed a lack of interest. Gibson confirmed in November 2021 that he was in talks to direct and star in the fifth film, saying that he would be helming the film to honor Donner, who wrote the screenplay and was originally set to direct the film prior to his death in July 2021. It was reported that Richard Wenk (The Equalizer, Jack Reacher: Never Go Back) had drafted the screenplay.

In June 2024, Gibson confirmed in an interview with the Inspire Me podcast that he would direct the fifth installment of the Lethal Weapon franchise and that the film would stay true to Donner's vision and influence. Gibson also stated that he and Glover would return to play their respective roles of Riggs and Murtaugh.

In September 2024, Gibson attended FanX Comic Convention in Salt Lake City, where he talked about the franchise, while voicing his displeasure as to why Hollywood producers were not giving him approval to work on the film. He said, "The fifth one is written. It's interesting. It's been held up for one reason or another. There's always issues with these things. I think it's the best one of the whole series. But it just won't get made for some reason or another. I can't even explain why."

== Television ==
=== Lethal Weapon (2016–2019) ===
A television adaptation of the film series was developed by Matthew Miller as co-executive producer, along with Dan Lin and Jennifer Gwartz for Fox. Clayne Crawford and Damon Wayans starred as Riggs and Murtaugh. Other cast include Keesha Sharp replacing Golden Brooks as Trish, Jordana Brewster as Dr. Maureen Cahill, Kevin Rahm as Captain Brooks Avery, Chandler Kinney as Riana Murtaugh, Dante Brown as Roger "R.J." Murtaugh Jr., Johnathan Fernandez as Scorsese, and Thomas Lennon in the recurring role of Leo Getz. Fox gave Lethal Weapon a series order in May 2016. For the third season, Crawford was replaced by Seann William Scott, as a new character named Wesley Cole. Crawford was fired from the show after Fox and Warner Bros. refused to aid in escalating tensions between Crawford and Wayans, and the series killed off the character of Riggs. After three seasons Fox canceled the show in May 2019.

| Season | Episodes | Originally released | |
| Season | Episodes | First released | Last released |
|---|---|---|---|
| 1 | 18 | September 21, 2016 | March 15, 2017 |
| 2 | 22 | September 26, 2017 | May 8, 2018 |
| 3 | 15 | September 25, 2018 | February 26, 2019 |

== Cast and crew ==
=== Cast ===
Key
- A ^{Y} indicates the actor portrayed the role of a younger version of the character.
- A ^{P} indicates the actor portrayed the role of the character in a photograph.
- A dark grey cell indicates the character was not in the film.

| Characters | Films | | | | Television series |
| Characters | Lethal Weapon | Lethal Weapon 2 | Lethal Weapon 3 | Lethal Weapon 4 | Lethal Weapon |
| Characters | 1987 | 1989 | 1992 | 1998 | 2016–2019 |
The Gang
| Martin Riggs | Mel Gibson | Mel Gibson | Mel Gibson | Mel Gibson | Clayne Crawford (Note: Additionally, Chase Mangum portrays a young Martin Riggs in Season 2.) (Seasons 1 & 2) |
| Roger Murtaugh | Danny Glover | Danny Glover | Danny Glover | Danny Glover | Damon Wayans |
| Leo Getz | | Joe Pesci | Joe Pesci | Joe Pesci | Thomas Lennon |
| Lorna Cole Riggs | | | Rene Russo | Rene Russo | |
| Lee Butters | | | | Chris Rock | |
| Wesley Cole | | | | | Seann William Scott (Note: Additionally, Ammon Jacob Ford and Evan Hofer portray a young Wesley Cole in Season 3.) (Season 3) |
Riggs' love interests
| Victoria Lynn Riggs | Uncredited Actress^{P} | Mentioned | | Mentioned | Floriana Lima (as Miranda Riggs) |
| Rika van den Hass | | Patsy Kensit | | | |
| Karen Palmer | | | | | Hilarie Burton |
| Molly Hendricks | | | | | Kristen Gutoskie (Note: Additionally, Sophia Woodward portrays a young Molly Hendricks in Season 2.) |
Murtaugh's family
| Trish Murtaugh | Darlene Love | Darlene Love | Darlene Love | Darlene Love | Keesha Sharp |
| Rianne Murtaugh | Traci Wolfe | Traci Wolfe | Traci Wolfe | Traci Wolfe | Chandler Kinney (as Riana Murtaugh) |
| Nick Murtaugh | Damon Hines | Damon Hines | Damon Hines | Damon Hines | Dante Brown (as Roger Murtaugh Jr.) |
| Carrie Murtaugh | Ebonie Smith | Ebonie Smith | Ebonie Smith | Ebonie Smith | |
Other
| Captain Ed Murphy | Steve Kahan | Steve Kahan | Steve Kahan | Steve Kahan | Kevin Rahm (as Captain Brooks Avery) |
| Dr. Stephanie Woods | Mary Ellen Trainor | Mary Ellen Trainor | Mary Ellen Trainor | Mary Ellen Trainor | Jordana Brewster (as Dr. Maureen Cahill) |
| Mr. Joshua | Gary Busey | | | | |
| Gen. Peter McAlliser | Mitchell Ryan | | | | |
| Michael Hunsaker | Tom Atkins | | | | |
| Arjen Rudd | | Joss Ackland | | | |
| Pieter Vorstedt | | Derrick O'Connor | | | |
| Mickey McGee | | Jack McGee | Jack McGee | | |
| Jack Travis | | | Stuart Wilson | | |
| Tyrone | | | Gregory Millar | | |
| Wah Sing Ku | | | | Jet Li | |
| Uncle Benny Chan | | | | Kim Chan | |
| Hong | | | | Eddy Ko | |
| Detective Ng | | | | Calvin Jung | |
| Bernard Scorsese | | | | | Johnathan Fernandez |
| Detective Sonya Bailey | | | | | Michelle Mitchenor |
| Detective Alejandro "Alex" Cruz | | | | | Richard Cabral |
| Detective Zach Bowman | | | | | Andrew Creer |
| Natalie Flynn | | | | | Maggie Lawson |
| Erica Malick | | | | | Nishi Munshi |
| Louie "The Gute" Gutierrez | | | | | Paola Lázaro |

=== Crew ===
| Crew/Detail | Film | | | |
| Crew/Detail | Lethal Weapon | Lethal Weapon 2 | Lethal Weapon 3 | Lethal Weapon 4 |
| Crew/Detail | 1987 | 1989 | 1992 | 1998 |
|---|---|---|---|---|
| Director | Richard Donner | Richard Donner | Richard Donner | Richard Donner |
| Producer(s) | Richard Donner; Joel Silver | Richard Donner; Joel Silver | Richard Donner; Joel Silver | Richard Donner; Joel Silver |
| Screenwriter(s) | Shane Black | Jeffrey Boam | Jeffrey Boam; Robert Mark Kamen | Channing Gibson |
| Story by | Shane Black | Shane Black; Warren Murphy | Jeffrey Boam | Jonathan Lemkin; Alfred Gough; Miles Millar |
| Composer(s) | Michael Kamen; Eric Clapton | Michael Kamen; Eric Clapton; David Sanborn | Michael Kamen; Eric Clapton; David Sanborn | Michael Kamen; Eric Clapton; David Sanborn |
| Director of photography | Stephen Goldblatt | Stephen Goldblatt | Jan de Bont | Andrzej Bartkowiak |
| Editor(s) | Stuart Baird | Stuart Baird | Robert Brown; Battle Davis | Frank J. Urioste; Dallas Puett |
| Production companies | Silver Pictures | Silver Pictures | Silver Pictures | Silver Pictures; Doshudo Productions |
| Distributor | Warner Bros. Pictures | Warner Bros. Pictures | Warner Bros. Pictures | Warner Bros. Pictures |

== Reception ==
=== Box office performance ===
| Film | Release date | Box office revenue | | | Box office ranking | | Budget | Reference |
| Film | Release date | North America | Other territories | Worldwide | All time domestic | All time worldwide | Budget | Reference |
|---|---|---|---|---|---|---|---|---|
| Lethal Weapon | March 6, 1987 | $65,207,127 | $55,000,000 | $120,207,127 | #795 | | $15 million | |
| Lethal Weapon 2 | July 7, 1989 | $147,253,986 | $80,600,000 | $227,853,986 | #190 #172^{(A)} | #323 | $25 million | |
| Lethal Weapon 3 | May 15, 1992 | $144,731,527 | $177,000,000 | $321,731,527 | #199 #189^{(A)} | #189 | $35 million | |
| Lethal Weapon 4 | July 10, 1998 | $130,444,603 | $155,000,000 | $285,444,603 | #255 | #236 | $150 million | |
| Total | | $487,637,243 | $467,600,000 | $955,237,243 | | | $225 million^{(E)} | |
List indicators: A dark grey cell indicates the information is not available for the film.^{(E)} indicates an estimated figure based on available numbers.^{(A)} indicates the adjusted totals based on current ticket prices (calculated by Box Office Mojo).

=== Critical and public response ===
| Film | Rotten Tomatoes | Metacritic | CinemaScore |
|---|---|---|---|
| Lethal Weapon | 81% (59 reviews) | 68 (23 reviews) | A |
| Lethal Weapon 2 | 82% (44 reviews) | 70 (21 reviews) | A+ |
| Lethal Weapon 3 | 60% (47 reviews) | 40 (26 reviews) | A– |
| Lethal Weapon 4 | 53% (68 reviews) | 37 (21 reviews) | A– |

== Music ==
=== Soundtracks ===
| Title | U.S. release date | Length | Performed by | Label |
|---|---|---|---|---|
| Lethal Weapon: Original Motion Picture Soundtrack | March 31, 1987 | 40:00 | Michael Kamen, Eric Clapton and David Sanborn | Warner Bros. Records |
| Lethal Weapon 2: Original Motion Picture Soundtrack | August 2, 1989 | 45:56 | Michael Kamen, Eric Clapton and David Sanborn | Warner Bros. Records |
| Lethal Weapon 3: Original Motion Picture Soundtrack | June 9, 1992 | 39:32 | Michael Kamen, Eric Clapton and David Sanborn | Reprise Records |
| Lethal Weapon 4: Original Motion Picture Soundtrack | December 3, 2013 | 100:20 | Michael Kamen, Eric Clapton and David Sanborn | La-La Land Records |
| Lethal Weapon: Soundtrack Collection | December 3, 2013 | 464:51 | Michael Kamen, Eric Clapton and David Sanborn | La-La Land Records |

=== Singles ===
| Title | U.S. release date | Length | Artist(s) | Label | Film |
|---|---|---|---|---|---|
| "Lethal Weapon" | March 31, 1987 | 2:44 | Honeymoon Suite | Warner Bros. Records | Lethal Weapon |
| "Cheer Down" | August 22, 1989 | 4:08 | George Harrison | Warner Bros. Records | Lethal Weapon 2 |
| "It's Probably Me" | June 23, 1992 | 4:41 | Sting featuring Eric Clapton | A&M | Lethal Weapon 3 |
| "Runaway Train" | July 20, 1992 | 3:56 | Elton John and Eric Clapton | MCA and Rocket | Lethal Weapon 3 |
| "Fire in the Hole" | July 1998 | 5:31 | Van Halen | Warner Bros. Records | Lethal Weapon 4 |
| "Pilgrim" | November 1998 | 5:50 | Eric Clapton | Reprise Records; Warner Bros. Records | Lethal Weapon 4 |

== Other media ==
=== Video game ===
- Lethal Weapon – based on Lethal Weapon 3, released in 1992.

=== Pinball ===
- Lethal Weapon 3 - released in 1992

=== Theme park ride ===
- Lethal Weapon – The Ride
