= Lethal Weapon (TV series) =

American comedy-drama television series (2016–2019)

- Genre: Comedy drama; Buddy cop; Action; Police procedural
- Based on: Lethal Weapon by Shane Black
- Developed by: Matt Miller
- Starring: Damon Wayans; Clayne Crawford; Jordana Brewster; Keesha Sharp; Kevin Rahm; Johnathan Fernandez; Chandler Kinney; Dante Brown; Michelle Mitchenor; Seann William Scott
- Theme music composer: Vo Williams
- Composers: Josh Kramon; Ben Decter; Tree Adams; Robert Lydecker
- Country of origin: United States
- Original language: English
- No. of seasons: 3
- No. of episodes: 55 (list of episodes)

Production
- Executive producers: Matt Miller; Dan Lin; Jennifer Gwartz; McG
- Producer: Kelly Van Horn
- Production locations: Los Angeles, California
- Cinematography: Ramsey Nickell; David Moxness
- Editors: Matt Barber; Mark Conte; Jeffrey Asher
- Running time: 42–46 minutes
- Production companies: Good Session Productions; Lin Pictures; Warner Bros. Television

Original release
- Network: Fox
- Release: September 21, 2016 – February 26, 2019

Lethal Weapon is an American buddy cop action comedy-drama television series developed by Matt Miller and based on the Lethal Weapon film franchise created by Shane Black. The series served as a reboot, which ran for three seasons on Fox, from September 21, 2016 to February 26, 2019.

For its first two seasons, Lethal Weapon starred Clayne Crawford as Martin Riggs and Damon Wayans as Roger Murtaugh, mismatched detective partners who were also the main characters in the films, originally played by Mel Gibson and Danny Glover. The series also includes other characters directly or loosely inspired by characters from the films, including Leo Getz (played by Thomas Lennon), a close friend of Riggs and Murtaugh, portrayed in the films by Joe Pesci.

In May 2018, amidst reports of alleged bad behavior and incidents of hostility between cast and crew on the show's set, Crawford was fired from the show, resulting in the Martin Riggs character being killed off. Seann William Scott was hired to replace him the following season as a new character, Wesley Cole. The third season premiered on September 25.

Wayans left the series following the end-of-season production in December 2018.

== Synopsis ==
For the first two seasons, Roger Murtaugh, an aging detective with a wife and three children, is partnered with Martin Riggs, a young, unstable detective whose wife and unborn child were recently murdered. While Riggs' devil-may-care methods of collaring criminals puts his and Murtaugh's lives in danger on a regular basis, the two are able to develop a respect and form a close friendship. Following Riggs' death in season two, Murtaugh enters a six-month period of depression and during this time he meets and befriends Wesley Cole. Cole is a former CIA operative who has been everywhere and seen everything, and soon finds himself navigating a new partnership with Murtaugh, as he adjusts to life in Los Angeles.

== Episodes ==
Season	Episodes	Originally released	
Season	Episodes	First released	Last released
1	18	September 21, 2016	March 15, 2017
2	22	September 26, 2017	May 8, 2018
3	15	September 25, 2018	February 26, 2019

== Cast and characters ==
=== Main ===
- Clayne Crawford as Martin Riggs (seasons 1–2), a Navy SEAL-turned-police officer from El Paso, Texas. He moved to Los Angeles after the death of his wife and unborn child, transferring from the El Paso County Sheriff's Office to the LAPD's Robbery-Homicide Division. Riggs lives in a trailer on the beach. He was originally played by Mel Gibson in the film series.
- Damon Wayans as Roger Murtaugh, a senior Los Angeles Police Department Detective who returns to the force after recovering from a heart attack and is partnered with Texas transfer Martin Riggs. He is married with three children (two teenagers and a toddler). He is a native of Inglewood, California, and currently resides in Sherman Oaks. In "Family Ties", Murtaugh is promoted to Captain after Avery decides to step down in order to run for office. He was originally played by Danny Glover in the film series.
- Jordana Brewster as Dr. Maureen Cahill (seasons 1–2; guest season 3), the police department's psychologist who treats Det. Riggs (and occasionally Det. Murtaugh), although sometimes she is referred to as a psychiatrist and prescribes drugs (for example in "Better Living Through Chemistry"). The character is originally based on Dr. Stephanie Woods played by Mary Ellen Trainor in the film series.
- Keesha Sharp as Trish Murtaugh, Det. Murtaugh's loving wife and mother of his three children who works as a defense attorney. In the season one episode "As Good As It Getz", Trish quits her job after being passed over for managing partner at her law firm. She was originally played by Darlene Love in the film series.
- Kevin Rahm as Captain Brooks Avery, the Commanding Officer of Robbery-Homicide Division. Before his promotion, Capt. Avery was partners with Det. Murtaugh. In "Lawmen", it is revealed that years ago he and a Los Angeles County Sheriff's Department deputy (Malcolm-Jamal Warner) planted evidence to convict a murderer after previous evidence was excluded from trial; he was prepared to resign over the incident when it came to light, but Murtaugh convinced him to stay because if his impropriety was revealed it would mean that all of Avery's cases (many of which he worked with Murtaugh) would be reviewed if not overturned entirely. The character is based on Captain Ed Murphy played by Steve Kahan in the film series.
- Johnathan Fernandez as Bernard Scorsese, a medical examiner, forensic scientist and aspiring screenwriter who works alongside Dets. Murtaugh and Riggs.
- Michelle Mitchenor as Detective Sonya Bailey, a fellow detective with Robbery-Homicide Division. She is partnered with Det. Alex Cruz during the first season, Det. Zach Bowman in the second season, and Det. Luisa Gutierrez in the third season.
- Chandler Kinney as Riana Murtaugh, Det. Murtaugh's teenage daughter. The character is based on Rianne Murtaugh, played by Traci Wolfe in the film series.
- Dante Brown as Roger "RJ" Murtaugh Jr., Det. Murtaugh's teenage son. He graduated from high school at the end of season 1 and briefly attended college before dropping out during season 2. The character is based on Nick Murtaugh, played by Damon Hines in the film series.
- Seann William Scott as Wesley Cole (season 3), a war veteran, former C.I.A. field officer, and father who moves to Los Angeles to be closer to his child. He becomes Murtaugh's partner, after actor Clayne Crawford was fired from the series. The character is based on Lorna Cole, Riggs' love interest played by Rene Russo and Lee Butters played by Chris Rock in the film series.

=== Recurring ===
- Thomas Lennon as Leo Getz, a comedic ambulance-chasing lawyer who once worked in the District Attorney's office before being fired. He befriends Riggs and Murtaugh after he witnesses a client's murder, and is put under their protection. He quickly takes a liking to them and their friendship strengthens by the second season. He was originally played by Joe Pesci in the film series.
- Hilarie Burton as Karen Palmer (seasons 1–2), a DEA agent who sometimes works with Riggs and Murtaugh on drug trafficking cases, and is also Riggs' love interest. The two break up early in season 2.
- Floriana Lima as Miranda Riggs (née Delgado) (seasons 1–2), Det. Riggs' late wife, who is seen in flashbacks. Originally from the Los Angeles area, she moved to Texas when she married Riggs, and after her death, he moved to LA and joined the LAPD. The character is based on Victoria Riggs from the film series, although she was never seen as she had already died before the events of the first film.
- Richard Cabral as Detective Alejandro "Alex" Cruz (season 1), formerly an undercover officer with the LAPD's Gang Division who once worked at the Robbery-Homicide Division.
- Tony Plana as Ronnie Delgado (seasons 1–2), the Los Angeles City Attorney and Det. Riggs' father-in-law. He is stabbed in prison in the Season 2 episode "Diggin' Up Dirt", and dies in the hospital.
- Andrew Patrick Ralston as Jim McNeile, a dentist and neighbor of the Murtaughs.
- Michelle Hurd as Gina Santos (seasons 2–3), a police big shot who arrives to take control of the division as chief, superseding the authority of Captain Avery. She and Murtaugh had previously partnered as detectives on a stakeout.
- Andrew Creer as Detective Zach Bowman (season 2), a young detective who starts working at the precinct. He is soon partnered with Bailey. Leo Getz condescendingly calls them "The B-team", which the naïve Bowman thinks is because their last names both start with "B".
- Kristen Gutoskie as Molly Hendricks (season 2), Riggs' childhood friend and the ex-wife of his old best friend Jake, who has been in and out of prison. Riggs and Molly have a brief relationship that Riggs ends when he sees his work and his father are putting Molly and her son in danger. They later are able to reconcile, and make plans to move back to Texas together just before Riggs is shot in the season 2 finale.
- Rex Linn as Nathan Riggs (season 2), Riggs' abusive father
- Chase Mangum as Young Martin Riggs (season 2)
- Sophia Woodward as Young Molly Hendricks (season 2)
- Duncan Joiner as Ben (season 2), Molly's son via her ex-husband Jake
- Peter Coventry Smith as Garrett Riggs (seasons 2–3), Riggs' much younger half-brother and killer
- Maggie Lawson as Natalie Flynn (season 3), Cole's ex-wife
- Shay Rudolph as Maya Flynn (season 3), Cole and Natalie's daughter
- Mykelti Williamson as Tom Barnes (season 3), Cole's former commanding officer
- Paola Lázaro as Detective Luisa "The Gute" Gutierrez (season 3), Detective Sonya Bailey's new partner
- Nishi Munshi as Erica Malick (season 3), a deputy district attorney and potential love interest for Cole

== Production ==
The series was ordered in May 2016 and premiered on Fox on September 21. Fox picked up the series for a full season of 18 episodes in October. A 22-episode second season premiered on September 26, 2017. The series was renewed for a 13-episode third season, with Seann William Scott replacing Clayne Crawford as the series' co-lead, playing a new character. Fox later ordered an additional two episodes for the third season, bringing the total for the season to fifteen episodes. The third season premiered on September 25, 2018.

=== Casting ===
Damon Wayans was cast as Roger Murtaugh, followed by Golden Brooks as Trish Murtaugh, Jordana Brewster as Dr. Maureen Cahill, Kevin Rahm as Captain Avery, Clayne Crawford as Martin Riggs, and Chandler Kinney as Riana Murtaugh. Keesha Sharp took over the role of Trish Murtaugh from Brooks. Johnathan Fernandez was cast as Scorsese. When the pilot was picked up to series, Johnathan Fernandez was made a series regular. Though showrunner Matt Miller had expressed interest in making Thomas Lennon a series regular as Leo Getz at some point, he remained a recurring actor throughout the three season run.

In May 2018, Crawford was dismissed from the show for on-set behavioral issues and the producers were looking to replace him for a potential third season. Seann William Scott was cast that month as the new co-lead ahead of a third season renewal, playing a new character named Wesley Cole.

The same year in October, Damon Wayans announced his exit from the series, following the end of production for the third season in December. However, Fox Entertainment CEO Charlie Collier stated in February 2019 that there was a strong possibility of Wayans returning if the series were to be renewed for a fourth season. Wayans had cited health problems as the reason for his departure, as he revealed that he is diabetic. After these statements, producers rearranged Wayans' shooting schedules and provided diabetic meals for him on-set.

== International broadcast ==
In the United Kingdom, ITV started airing the series on March 3, 2017. Its viewing figures remained consistent with around 2.5 million tuning in each week. Season two started on January 12, 2018. Season three started on July 26, 2019. In Australia, the Nine Network premiered the series on January 29, 2017. In the Philippines, it premiered on June 10, 2017 on ABS-CBN and ended on September 9. Only 14 episodes were aired. In Hong Kong, the TVB Pearl premiered the series with switchable dual-language in original English and local Cantonese version on October 11, 2017. In New Zealand, it premiered on TV2 on 30 January 2017. In India, Zee Café premiered the first season on 29 September 2016. In Brazil, it has appeared since September 22, 2017 on the Warner Channel Brasil and on the Free-to-air TV on Rede Globo. In Canada, the series is on Netflix with new seasons arriving each September. In Greece, Star Channel started airing the series but after the conclusion of Season 2 on February 2, 2019 plans for broadcasting the final season have yet to be announced to this day by the network. In Bulgaria BTV (Bulgaria) started airing the series on August 1, 2019.

Ireland's RTE ran seasons 1 and 2 scheduled a few weeks after the US premiere of each episode. As of April 2021, they are still yet to first-run air any episodes in season 3.

In Malaysia, one of the TV broadcasters, TV2, aired Lethal Weapon season two at 8:00 PM every Friday through Sunday, from 28 September 2025 to 22 November 2025, with Malay subtitles. After the series finished airing, TV2 re-aired the series one month later at 11:00 PM every Tuesday through Friday, from 23 December 2025 to 28 January 2026.

== Home media ==
DVD & Blu-ray
Title	Release date			Additional
Title	Region 1/A	Region 2/B	Region 4/B	Additional
The Complete First Season	September 19, 2017	September 25, 2017	September 20, 2017	Features Set Details: 4-disc DVD (all regions); 3-disc Blu-ray (all regions); 791 minutes; 1.78:1 aspect ratio; Audio: English: Dolby Digital 5.1 (DVD); English: DTS-HD Master Audio 5.1 (Blu-ray); German: Dolby Digital 5.1 (Blu-ray); French: Dolby Digital 2.0 (Blu-ray); Spanish: Dolby Digital 2.0 (Blu-ray); Subtitles: English SDH (see additional subtitle options as they vary on different regions); Special features: Extended Pilot (Uncensored); All-New Featurette: "Reloading Lethal Weapon"; Deleted Scenes; Gag Reel; Rating: BBFC: 15; ACB: MA15+
The Complete Second Season	September 18, 2018	October 1, 2018	TBA	Features Set Details: 1.78:1 aspect ratio; Audio: TBA; Subtitles: TBA; Special features: TBA; Ratings: TBA
The Complete Third Season	September 17, 2019	TBA	TBA	Features Set Details: 1.78:1 aspect ratio; Audio: TBA; Subtitles: TBA; Special features: TBA; Ratings: TBA

== Reception ==
=== Critical reception ===
Lethal Weapon received mixed reviews from critics. For the first season, review aggregator Rotten Tomatoes reported a 67% approval rating, with an average rating of 5.35/10 based on 42 reviews. The consensus says, "Lethal Weapon's overly polished production values and tired narrative are somewhat overcome by solid chemistry between its two leads". On Metacritic, the first season has a weighted average of 56 out of 100 based on 24 reviews, indicating "mixed or average reviews".

The second season received positive reviews. Rotten Tomatoes gave a rating of 100% with an average rating of 7.3/10 based on 5 reviews.

For the third season, 100% of Rotten Tomatoes' 5 critic reviews were positive, with an average score of 8.2/10.

On Rotten Tomatoes, the series has an average score of 89%.

=== Ratings ===
Viewership and ratings per season of Lethal Weapon
Season	Timeslot (ET)	Episodes	First aired		Last aired		TV season	Viewership rank	Avg. viewers (millions)	18–49 rank	Avg. 18–49 rating
Season	Timeslot (ET)	Episodes	Date	Viewers (millions)	Date	Viewers (millions)	TV season	Viewership rank	Avg. viewers (millions)	18–49 rank	Avg. 18–49 rating
1	Wednesday 8:00 pm	18	September 21, 2016	7.93	March 15, 2017	6.02	2016–17	35	8.63	TBD	2.2/8
2	Tuesday 8:00 pm	22	September 26, 2017	4.37	May 8, 2018	3.15	2017–18	90	5.38	TBD	1.3
3	Tuesday 9:00 pm (1–9); Tuesday 8:00 pm (10–15)	15	September 25, 2018	3.43	February 26, 2019	3.06	2018–19	78	5.40	TBD	1.2

=== Accolades ===
Year	Awards	Category	Recipient	Result	Ref.
2017	NAACP Image Awards	Outstanding Actress in a Comedy Series	Keesha Sharp	Nominated	
2017	Teen Choice Awards	Choice Action TV Show	Lethal Weapon	Nominated	
2017	Teen Choice Awards	Choice Action TV Actor	Clayne Crawford	Nominated	
2017	Teen Choice Awards	Choice Action TV Actress	Jordana Brewster	Nominated	
2018	Teen Choice Awards	Choice Action TV Show	Lethal Weapon	Nominated	
2018	Teen Choice Awards	Choice Action TV Actor	Damon Wayans	Nominated	

== See also ==
- Action comedy TV series
