= Martin Riggs =

Fictional character

- Lethal Weapon character
- Mel Gibson as Martin Riggs in Lethal Weapon
- First appearance: Lethal Weapon (1987)
- Last appearance: Lethal Weapon (2016–2018)
- Created by: Shane Black
- Portrayed by: Mel Gibson (films); Clayne Crawford (television)

In-universe information
- Aliases: Mad Cop, Chaos
- Title(s): Films: Sergeant; Patrolman (Lethal Weapon 3); Captain & Sergeant (Lethal Weapon 4); Television: Detective
- Occupation: Police officer
- Family: Television: Nathan Riggs (father, deceased); Garrett Riggs (half-brother, deceased)
- Spouses: Films: Victoria Lynn Riggs (deceased); Lorna Cole Riggs; Television: Miranda Riggs (deceased)
- Children: Billy Riggs (son); Television: 1 stillborn son
- Religion: Agnostic
- Nationality: American
- Status: Films: Alive; Television: Deceased

Martin Riggs is a fictional character from the Lethal Weapon film series created by Shane Black. Riggs was originally played by actor Mel Gibson in all four films from 1987 to 1998, and later by Clayne Crawford in the Fox television series from 2016 to 2018.

Originally a member of the Los Angeles Police Department's Narcotics Division, upon being reassigned to the Homicide Division, Riggs is partnered up with straight-laced sergeant Roger Murtaugh. Riggs and Murtaugh remain partners and best friends throughout the film series.

== Career ==
=== Military career ===
Martin Riggs joins the U.S. Army at age 19, eventually becoming a member of the U.S. Army Special Forces, receiving specialized training in weaponry and hand-to-hand combat. Most of Riggs' time in special forces is in Vietnam, where he serves as an assassin under the CIA's "Phoenix Project". During this time, he shoots a man with a sniper rifle from a long distance (1,000 yards) in Laos; while his ability as a trained killer later affects his mental health, he thinks of it as "the only thing I was ever really good at".

=== Family ===
In 1984, Riggs's wife of 11 years, Victoria Lynn, dies in a car accident, sending him into a deep depression. Driven by grief to the brink of suicide, Riggs regularly puts himself (and anyone else near him) in danger, hoping that someone will kill him. This total disregard for his own life makes him completely fearless, turning him into a "Lethal Weapon". By the end of the first film, however, he vows to move on with his life. In the second film, it is revealed that Victoria was actually murdered during an attempt on Riggs's life.

=== In the films ===
In Lethal Weapon, Riggs is transferred from the narcotics division to the homicide division after a shooting incident. He is partnered with Detective Sergeant Roger Murtaugh in hopes that the older, more mature veteran will keep him in line. After a rough start, the two become best friends throughout the film series, even though Riggs always gets on Murtaugh's nerves. By the end of the first film, the two work together to rescue Murtaugh's daughter, who had been kidnapped by drug lords and mercenaries.

In Lethal Weapon 2, Riggs discovers that South African crime lord Arjen Rudd, whom he and Murtaugh are pursuing, ordered Riggs's death in 1984. Rudd's enforcer, Pieter Vorstedt, killed Victoria Riggs by mistake and made the murder look like an automobile accident to cover up their involvement. After avenging the deaths of Victoria and Rika van den Haas (whom Riggs had become involved with romantically before she, too, was murdered by Rudd and his minions), he is able to move on with his life. Meanwhile, Riggs and Murtaugh are assigned to protect loudmouthed federal witness Leo Getz, with whom they ultimately become close friends.

He meets Sgt. Lorna Cole, an internal affairs officer, in Lethal Weapon 3 during an investigation into the disappearance of weapons from LAPD impound. The two make an immediate connection and work closely together to clear Murtaugh's name after he is forced to kill his son's friend in self-defense. Riggs and Cole become romantically involved and move in together after the end of the film.

In Lethal Weapon 4, Riggs and Cole are still living together, and she is pregnant with their child, but they have dodged the issue of marriage. Both Riggs and Murtaugh are promoted to captain by the fourth film in order to keep them out of trouble, but are demoted back to sergeants at the end of the film. Leo helps Riggs finally make peace with Victoria's death; Riggs marries Cole while she is giving birth to their son named Billy.

== Television series ==
In a March 2016 newspaper article, the plot for the television pilot is as follows: "When Texas cop and former Navy SEAL Martin Riggs...suffers the loss of his wife and baby, he moves to Los Angeles to start anew. There, he gets partnered with LAPD detective Roger Murtaugh...who, having recently suffered a 'minor' heart attack, must avoid any stress in his life." In the Season Two finale, Riggs kills his abusive father during a fight after rescuing Murtaugh's wife. At the end of the episode, Riggs visits his deceased wife's grave. At the gravesite, his much younger half-brother Garrett shows up, shoots him in the chest, mortally wounding him, and leaves. In the Season Three premiere, he dies from his gunshot wound in the hospital and is subsequently replaced by Wesley Cole as Murtaugh's partner.

== Weapons ==
In the first film, Riggs' main sidearm is a Beretta 92F handgun. In films 2–4, he carries a Beretta 92FS.

== Reception ==
Critics have given the character a positive reception. He is praised for his dramatic and brutal fight scene with Mr. Joshua (Gary Busey) and the sharp and clever dialogue provided by Shane Black. Martin Riggs is number 100 on Empire's list of "The 100 Greatest Movie Characters".
