= Calvin Jung =

American film, stage and television actor

- Born: February 17, 1945 (age 81); New York, U.S.
- Occupations: Film, stage and television actor

Calvin Jung (born February 17, 1945) is an American film, stage and television actor. He is best known for playing gang member Steve Minh in the 1987 film RoboCop.

Jung guest-starred in television programs including Cheers, Sunset Beach, Murder, She Wrote, How I Met Your Mother, Trapper John, M.D., The New WKRP in Cincinnati and Providence. He also appeared in films such as Lethal Weapon 4 (as Detective Ng), The Formula, Frankie & Johnny, American Gun and American Ninja 3: Blood Hunt. In 1980, he played as Dale in the stage play FOB at the Joseph Papp Public Theater.

Jung retired from acting 2022, last appearing in the BET+ drama television series All the Queen's Men.
