= Lethal Weapon 2 =

1989 American film directed by Richard Donner

- Theatrical release poster
- Directed by: Richard Donner
- Screenplay by: Jeffrey Boam
- Story by: Shane Black; Warren Murphy
- Based on: Characters by Shane Black
- Produced by: Richard Donner; Joel Silver
- Starring: Mel Gibson; Danny Glover; Joe Pesci; Joss Ackland; Derrick O'Connor; Patsy Kensit
- Cinematography: Stephen Goldblatt
- Edited by: Stuart Baird
- Music by: Michael Kamen; Eric Clapton; David Sanborn
- Production company: Silver Pictures
- Distributed by: Warner Bros.
- Release date: July 7, 1989
- Running time: 114 minutes
- Country: United States
- Languages: English; Afrikaans
- Budget: $30 million
- Box office: $227.3 million

Lethal Weapon 2 is a 1989 American buddy cop action comedy film directed by Richard Donner, and starring Mel Gibson, Danny Glover, Joe Pesci, Joss Ackland, Derrick O'Connor and Patsy Kensit. It is a sequel to the 1987 film Lethal Weapon and the second installment in the Lethal Weapon film series.

Gibson and Glover respectively reprise their roles as LAPD officers Martin Riggs and Roger Murtaugh, who protect an irritating federal witness (Pesci), while taking on a gang of South African drug smugglers hiding behind diplomatic immunity.

Lethal Weapon 2 was released by Warner Bros. on July 7, 1989. The film was nominated for an Academy Award for Best Sound Editing (for Robert G. Henderson). The film received mostly positive reviews and earned $227 million worldwide. The film was followed by Lethal Weapon 3 (1992).

== Plot ==
Two years after the events of the first film, LAPD sergeants Martin Riggs and Roger Murtaugh are pursuing unidentified suspects suspected of drug trafficking. However, they discover they have been transporting an illegal shipment of gold in the form of Krugerrand coins from the National Party-led government of South Africa. Later, consul-general Arjen Rudd and security agent Pieter Vorstedt kill Hans, their associate who lost the shipment of Krugerrands, and debate how to steer the police away from their activities. Pieter suggests warning Murtaugh off the investigation, so commits a home invasion on his residence, causing Captain Murphy to reassign Riggs and Murtaugh to protecting an obnoxious federal witness, Leo Getz.

It soon becomes clear that both cases are related; after an attempt on Leo's life, Riggs and Murtaugh learn of the former's murky past laundering funds for vengeful drug smugglers. Leo explains how the laundering works and leads them to the gang, but upon dispatching his would-be assassin and returning with backup they are confronted by Rudd, who invokes diplomatic immunity on behalf of his "associates", leaving the LAPD powerless to take action against them.

Although instructed to leave the case alone, Riggs begins openly harassing Rudd and romances his secretary, Rika van den Haas, a liberal-minded Afrikaner who despises her employer along with his racial and cultural philosophy. Murtaugh enlists Leo's help in creating a scene at the consulate that wins the support of anti-apartheid protesters outside. Vorstedt is dispatched to murder all of the officers investigating them while Murtaugh deduces that Rudd is attempting to ship funds from his smuggling ring in the United States to Cape Town, South Africa via Los Angeles Harbor. Two assassins attack Murtaugh at his home, but he kills them both with his contractor's nail gun, and Leo is abducted in the process.

Meanwhile, Vorstedt seizes Riggs at van den Haas' apartment and discloses he was responsible for the death of Riggs's wife years earlier during a botched assassination attempt on him. (Note: As depicted in Lethal Weapon (1987).) He has his men kill Rika by drowning her and orders the pair to do the same to Riggs, who frees himself and brutally kills them. Riggs phones Murtaugh, declaring an intention to pursue Rudd and avenge his wife, Rika, and their fallen friends; Murtaugh willingly forsakes his badge to aid his partner. After rescuing Leo and destroying Rudd's house, they head for the Alba Varden, Rudd's freighter docked in the Port of Los Angeles, as the South Africans prepare their getaway with hundreds of millions in drug money.

While investigating a guarded cargo container at the docks, Riggs and Murtaugh discover Rudd's laundered drug money, but are locked inside by Rudd's men. They break out, scattering two pallets of the money into the harbor in the process. Riggs and Murtaugh engage in a firefight with Rudd's men aboard the Alba Varden before separating to hunt down Rudd. Riggs confronts and fights Vorstedt hand-to-hand, stabs the latter with his own knife and drops a container on him, crushing him to death. Rudd retaliates by shooting Riggs in the back multiple times and again invokes diplomatic immunity when Murtaugh aims his gun at him. However, Murtaugh fatally shoots him and declares that his immunity has "just been revoked". He then tends to Riggs, and they share a laugh as more LAPD personnel respond to the scene.

== Cast ==
- Mel Gibson as Martin Riggs
- Danny Glover as Roger Murtaugh
- Joe Pesci as Leo Getz
- Joss Ackland as Arjen Rudd
- Derrick O'Connor as Pieter Vorstedt
- Patsy Kensit as Rika van den Haas
- Darlene Love as Trish Murtaugh
- Traci Wolfe as Rianne Murtaugh
- Mark Rolston as Hans
- Steve Kahan as Captain Ed Murphy
- Dean Norris as Detective Tim Cavanaugh

In addition, series regulars – who appear in minor roles in all four films of the franchise – include: Damon Hines and Ebonie Smith as Murtaugh children Nick and Carrie, respectively; and Mary Ellen Trainor as psychologist Stephanie Woods.

== Production ==
=== Shane Black and Warren Murphy's original Play Dirty script ===
Following the success of the first film, Warner Bros. Pictures and producers decided to make the sequel. Producer Joel Silver asked writer of the first film Shane Black to write the script for the sequel in the spring of 1987 and Black agreed. Although he was struggling with personal issues, Black still managed to write the first draft along with his friend, novelist Warren Murphy, co-creator of Remo Williams (the lead character of The Destroyer novels). Their original title for the script was Play Dirty, which Black later used for a film he directed.

Although many people thought that their script was brilliant, it was rejected by Silver, the studio, and director Richard Donner for being too dark and bloody, and because in the ending of the script Riggs dies, while they wanted to keep him alive in case of further sequels. They also wanted the second film to focus more on comedy, while Black's draft focused more on courage and heroics, such as Riggs willing to die to protect Murtaugh and his family, owing to his love for them.

When his script was rejected, Black felt that he had failed the producers. He initially offered to give his payment back, but his agent talked him out of it. Black also refused to re-write the script and quit from the project after working for six months on it. Black later said how the problem with the second film was that they did too much comedy, and how he dislikes the third and fourth films because of the way Riggs's character was changed.

The final version of the script written by Jeffrey Boam that was used for filming was completely different from Black's draft, other than the scene in which the stilt house is destroyed. The character of Leo Getz was originally a minor character in Black's draft with only one scene and few lines of dialogue. Some of the other differences include more graphic violence throughout the script, which included the South Africans being even more vicious than in the final film; at one point Shapiro, the female police officer working with Riggs and Murtaugh, is tortured to death by them. There was also a scene in which Riggs gets tortured by them in a similar way to how he was in first film, but much worse. There was also an action scene in the script in which a plane full of cocaine gets destroyed and cocaine falls over Los Angeles "like snow."

In Black's script the final battle took place on hills covered with a big brush fire, and after destruction of the stilt house Riggs chases the main villain Benedict (Pieter Vorstedt in the film), a much different and more dangerous character in the original script and Riggs's "arch-nemesis and worst nightmare" according to Black, into the heart of the fire, after which Riggs gets stabbed and dies slowly from his wounds. The last scene in the script was Murtaugh watching the video tape that Riggs made before the final battle since he knew that he was going to die, and on which he says goodbye to Murtaugh.

Black's reason for killing Riggs in his draft of the script, as he said in an interview, was that in first film Riggs was a "suicidal mess" who did not care about living or dying but his friendship with Murtaugh and his family was what helped him, and him sacrificing himself to save them would be the last thing he would have to do to be fully at peace. Black also said how the death scene he wrote for Riggs was "beautiful" and would make the audience cry. Black later labeled his rejected Play Dirty script "the best thing I ever wrote" and said he learned to trust his instincts after this experience. Black's script was never released, despite failed attempts by fans to find a copy of it.

Director Richard Donner said in the film's Blu-ray commentary that the film was shot in such a way that it could be edited with two different endings, one in which Riggs dies and one in which he lives. Audiences in test screenings responded well to Riggs's survival, and this was kept, though the last shot in the film with the camera moving away from Murtaugh holding Riggs was shot for the ending in which he dies.

=== Jeffrey Boam's final script ===
When the original Shane Black screenplay was changed, he left the series. The rewrites that resulted in the final film are by Jeffrey Boam (screenwriter for Indiana Jones and the Last Crusade and The Lost Boys). Boam also did some uncredited re-writing of the script for the first film when Donner thought that some parts of it were too dark and violent. Boam initially wrote two different drafts for his re-write of Lethal Weapon 2; one which was hard-boiled action script and one which had more comedy. He was told to mix the two drafts together and make a new one that was going to be used for filming. However, not only did Boam end up having to re-write the script many times even before filming started, but he also had to keep re-writing it during production since Donner would always want to improvise something new in a scene or demanded changes to be made on the script in the middle of filming. Boam also wrote the script for Lethal Weapon 3 and he once again had to re-write his script many times before and during filming of that sequel for same reasons. He also wrote an unused draft for the fourth film around January 1995 which had Riggs and Murtaugh fighting against a neo-Nazi survivalist militia group that was committing a terrorist attack in L.A.

Screenwriter Robert Mark Kamen said in October 2012 interview for craveonline that during the time when he was working as screenwriter for Warner Bros. and would often do lot of uncredited work on their films, he also worked on Lethal Weapon 2 and 3. He said how amongst large chunks of the stuff he added in Lethal Weapon 2 script during re-writes were all the parts with South African villains. Although he was uncredited for his work on this film, he did get a credit for his work on Lethal Weapon 3 because he did a lot more work on that sequel.

Originally, the character of Rika was intended to survive, with the last scene in the film being Riggs and Rika eating Thanksgiving dinner with the Murtaughs, but the director decided to kill the character to increase Riggs' motivation to destroy the South African drug smugglers. The film was the debut of Leo Getz (Joe Pesci), a crooked but whistle-blowing CPA who is placed in protective custody by Riggs and Murtaugh, and makes the detectives' work more difficult owing to his neurotic behavior. The Getz character remained a regular throughout the remainder of the film series.

=== Filming ===
The scene in which Riggs is on the road outside Arjen's stilt house and grabs onto the front of the truck (the same scene with the surfboard killing a driver) was filmed on March 21, 1989. The opening chase sequence was filmed on November 28, 1988. The scenes in which Riggs and Rika are ambushed by helicopters at night on the beach were filmed at Marineland of the Pacific in Rancho Palos Verdes, California, on "Cobble Beach". Other portions of the film were shot in Palm Springs, California.

== Soundtrack ==
The soundtrack was released on Warner Bros. Records August 8, 1989, and was written and performed by Michael Kamen, Eric Clapton, and David Sanborn.

The track list released commercially is as follows:

1. "Cheer Down" by George Harrison
2. "Still Cruisin' (After All These Years)" by The Beach Boys
3. "Knockin' on Heaven's Door" (Bob Dylan) by Randy Crawford, Eric Clapton and David Sanborn
4. "Riggs"
5. "The Embassy"
6. "Riggs and Roger"
7. "Leo"
8. "Goodnight Rika"
9. "The Stilt House"
10. "The Shipyard / Knockin' on Heaven's Door"

The soundtrack also includes "I'm Not Scared" performed by Eighth Wonder, which features co-star Patsy Kensit on vocals, and The Skyliners performed "Since I Don't Have You", "This I Swear", "Lonely Way", "How Much", and "Believe Me"; however, none of these are included on the soundtrack album.

In 2013, La-La Land Records issued the complete score (plus the original soundtrack album) as Discs 3 and 4 of its Lethal Weapon: Soundtrack Collection eight-disc set.

== Release ==
=== Home media ===
Lethal Weapon 2 has been released on VHS and DVD numerous times, along with singular LaserDisc and Blu-ray Disc releases. The first DVD was released in 1997 and featured the film's theatrical version. The Director's Cut was released in 2000. Since then, numerous sets have been released that contain all four films in the series (featuring the same DVDs). The theatrical version was also released on Blu-ray in 2006.

== Reception ==
=== Box office performance ===
Lethal Weapon 2 was the third most successful film of 1989 in North America (after Batman and Indiana Jones and the Last Crusade), earning nearly $147.3 million in the US and $80.6 million overseas for a worldwide total of $227.9 million.

=== Critical reception ===
On the review aggregator website Rotten Tomatoes, 82% of 44 critics' reviews are positive, with an average rating of 6.9/10. The website's consensus reads: "Lethal Weapon 2 may sport a thin plot typical of action fare, but its combination of humor and adrenaline, along with the chemistry between its leads, make this a playful, entertaining sequel." Metacritic, which uses a weighted average, assigned the film a score of 70 out of 100, based on 21 critics, indicating "generally favorable" reviews.

The New York Times stated, "Though it includes a smashed car full of Krugerrands, a hillside house blown off its stilts and a bomb set under a toilet, the point of Lethal Weapon 2 is that Mel Gibson and Danny Glover get to race around in all that chaos, acting crazy. Before it skids out of control in the final sequence, the film is so careful to preserve its successful comic-action formula that it follows the most basic law of sequels. If you liked Lethal Weapon, you'll like Lethal Weapon 2; it's almost as simple as that." Los Angeles Times reviewer Michael Wilmington stated that "though it's nice to have a big-audience action movie attacking apartheid and the slaughter of sea mammals, instead of acting as an enlistment poster for the Army Air Corps, local vigilante groups or the reopening of the Vietnam War, the sentiments don't really transcend the car crashes."
