= Traci Wolfe =

American actress

Traci Wolfe (born December 27, 1960) is an American film actress and model, known for her role as Rianne Murtaugh in all four films of the Lethal Weapon series.

== Career ==
Prior to acting, Wolfe was a Wilhelmina model. In the 1987 film Lethal Weapon, Wolfe played Rianne Murtaugh, the daughter of Danny Glover's character, a role which she would reprise in all three sequels. For her role in the first part of the Lethal Weapon series, she was awarded an NAACP Image Award in the category of Outstanding Supporting Actress in a Motion Picture the year it was released. She was seen again as Rianne Murtaugh in 1989's Lethal Weapon 2 and later reprised the role in Lethal Weapon 3 (1992) and Lethal Weapon 4 (1998).

In addition to Lethal Weapon, Wolfe had a few television appearances: two episodes of The Cosby Show and one episode of In the Heat of the Night, as a niece of Virgil Tibbs.

Following a 22-year absence, Wolfe made a limited returned to acting, appearing in a 2020 episode of Katy Keene, a 2022 episode of Blue Bloods and a 2022 episode of Law & Order: Special Victims Unit. She also appeared in the 2022 film She Said.

== Personal life ==
During the 1990s, Wolfe volunteered at the Maryland Museum of African Art and lived in Columbia, Maryland.

== Filmography ==
Television and film roles
Year	Title	Role	Notes
1986, 1989	The Cosby Show	Terri / Teresa	Episode: "Theo and Cockroach" (as Teresa); Episode: "Cliff la Dolce" (as Terri)
1987	Lethal Weapon	Rianne Murtaugh	
1989	In the Heat of the Night	Nicole	Episode: "Country Mouse, City Mouse"
1989	Lethal Weapon 2	Rianne Murtaugh	
1992	Lethal Weapon 3	Rianne Murtaugh	
1998	Lethal Weapon 4	Rianne Murtaugh	
2020	Katy Keene	Francesca Arnault	Episode: "Chapter Thirteen: Come Together"
2022	Blue Bloods	Ellie	Episode: "Cold Comfort"
