= Roger Murtaugh =

- Lethal Weapon character
- Danny Glover as Roger Murtaugh in Lethal Weapon
- First appearance: Lethal Weapon (1987)
- Last appearance: Lethal Weapon (2016–2019)
- Created by: Shane Black
- Portrayed by: Danny Glover (films); Damon Wayans (television)

In-universe information
- Alias: Mayhem
- Nickname: Rog
- Title(s): Films: Sergeant; Patrolman (Lethal Weapon 3); Captain & Sergeant (Lethal Weapon 4); Television: Detective; Captain
- Occupation: Police officer
- Spouse: Trish Murtaugh
- Children: Films: Rianne Murtaugh Butters; Nick Murtaugh; Carrie Murtaugh; Television: Roger "RJ" Murtaugh Jr. Riana Murtaugh; Harper Murtaugh
- Relatives: Films: Lee Butters (son-in-law); Victoria Butters (granddaughter)
- Religion: Christian
- Nationality: American
- Status: Films: Alive; Television: Alive

Roger Murtaugh (/ˈmɜːrtɔː/) is a fictional character in the Lethal Weapon film series created by Shane Black. Murtaugh was originally played by actor Danny Glover in all four films from 1987 to 1998, and later by Damon Wayans in the Fox television series from 2016 to 2019.

== Lethal Weapon (1987) ==
Murtaugh is a cynical homicide detective and family man. He was a lieutenant of the 173rd Airborne Brigade in the U.S. Army, and served in the Vietnam War. He joined the Los Angeles Police Department in 1967 and celebrates his 50th birthday at the start of Lethal Weapon. He has begun to consider retirement, hence his catchphrase, "I'm too old for this shit". He is partnered with "loose cannon" and fellow Vietnam War veteran Martin Riggs (Mel Gibson) to investigate a suspected suicide of the daughter of one of Murtaugh's closest friends. Though the two initially hate each other, Murtaugh begins to sympathize with Riggs when Riggs saves his life. After Murtaugh discovers that his close friend from the Vietnam War, Michael Hunsaker, has been laundering the profits from a heroin-trafficking cartel, he confronts Hunsaker and learns the details of the organization before Mr. Joshua (Gary Busey), the cartel's primary henchman, kills Hunsaker. The cartel kidnaps Murtaugh's older daughter, Rianne, in an attempt to make Murtaugh reveal what Hunsaker told him. Murtaugh and Riggs plan an ambush, which fails. The cartel tortures Murtaugh, and threatens to torture Rianne as well, until Riggs rescues them. He manages to kill General McAllister, the head of the cartel, by shooting the driver of his car, causing a bus-versus-car crash and a gigantic explosion. He supports Riggs as he fights and arrests Mr. Joshua, and then he and Riggs kill Joshua when he attempts to shoot Riggs. By the end of the film, he has forgone retirement and accepted Riggs into his family.

== Lethal Weapon 2 (1989) ==
Murtaugh is targeted by a South African drug cartel fronted by ruthless diplomat Arjen Rudd, who has Murtaugh and his wife assaulted in their own home, forcing Murtaugh to temporarily move his family out. To assist Riggs' investigation of the South African consulate, Murtaugh portrays a man named Alphonse who wants to emigrate to South Africa to help overthrow the country's National Party-led government and dismantle apartheid. Following this, Murtaugh fights off two attackers in his home with a nail gun and rescues new friend Leo Getz (Joe Pesci), a federal witness, from the cartel. He helps Riggs track down and kill the other members of the cartel when it is revealed that the cartel murdered Riggs' wife. This includes an assault on a cargo ship which ends in the death of the remaining members of the cartel, including Rudd, whom Murtaugh kills after he shoots Riggs.

== Lethal Weapon 3 (1992) ==
Murtaugh and Riggs mishandle a car bomb, which destroys a building. As punishment, both are demoted to patrolman, but earn their previous rank when they foil an armored car robbery and expose a gun running cartel. While investigating this cartel, Murtaugh accidentally kills a fifteen-year-old boy to protect Riggs; the boy is revealed to be Darryl, the best friend of Murtaugh's son Nick. Murtaugh is overcome by guilt and succumbs to alcoholism and depression until Riggs helps him move on. Murtaugh works with Riggs and Internal Affairs officer Lorna Cole (Rene Russo) to destroy the cartel. As a comical sidelight, Murtaugh also helps Riggs quit smoking by giving him dog biscuits instead; he does show some hostility towards Riggs, however, when he believes that Riggs is becoming romantically involved with his daughter Rianne. However, Riggs opens up to him, admitting that he sees Murtaugh's family like his own family, the kids like his own children. In the midst of it all, Murtaugh enlists the help of Getz to sell his house, but in the end decides to keep the house when he decides not to retire.

== Lethal Weapon 4 (1998) ==
When the city loses its insurance carrier due to all the property damage that Riggs and Murtaugh have caused on the job, they are temporarily promoted to captain in hopes of keeping them off the street. Their status as veteran officers keeps them from being disciplined or fired, and there are no open lieutenant slots available. By the end of the film, their sergeant's ranks are restored due to the city now being self-insured. Murtaugh's oldest daughter Rianne is pregnant with his first grandchild and is secretly married to LAPD Sergeant Lee Butters (Chris Rock), but she decides not to tell her father until after the baby is born because she went against his wishes of marrying a police officer. However, prior to finding out, Murtaugh mistakenly thought that Butters was gay and attracted to him, because of all the nice things he was trying to do for Murtaugh, which was actually intended for him to stay on his father-in-law's good side (which Riggs helped exploit this misconception after he learned the truth from Lorna). Later, Murtaugh hits Riggs for not telling him about Rianne and Butters (Riggs and Butters blurt out the truth after being exposed to nitrous oxide) after interrogating Uncle Benny (Kim Chan). When Murtaugh accidentally kills the brother of Triad enforcer Wah Sing Ku (Jet Li), Riggs and Murtaugh engage in an intense physical altercation with Ku, resulting in Ku's death and Riggs being crushed beneath rubble underwater. Murtaugh rescues Riggs, and the two celebrate Rianne's marriage to Butters and the birth of their daughter named Victoria, joined by Lorna, Leo Getz, and the rest of Murtaugh's family in the hospital.

== Weapons ==
In all four films Murtaugh's signature weapon is a 4" Smith & Wesson Model 19 .357 Magnum revolver which Riggs calls a "Six-shooter...A lot of old-timers carry those". In movies 2–4, he also uses a Smith & Wesson Model 5906 9mm pistol as a backup gun.

== In popular culture ==
Murtaugh's catchphrase "I'm too old for this shit" has become associated with Glover, who uses the catchphrase (and variations of it) in other roles as well, such as his role as the patriarch in Almost Christmas, a cameo in Maverick and his guest spot on Psych. In the How I Met Your Mother episode "Murtaugh", Ted Mosby, portrayed by Josh Radnor, has a "Murtaugh List" of things which he has gotten too old to eat, do, and enjoy.

In the season 7 episode "Ransom" of NBC's Brooklyn Nine-Nine, Captain Raymond Holt, played by Andre Braugher, claims that a movie was made on his crazy life back in the 80's. When Jake Peralta asks him which movie it was, he insists he doesn't remember, and walks off saying "I'm too old for this crap", hinting that it was the Lethal Weapon series.

== Reception ==
Critics have given the character a mixed reception. The Los Angeles Times described the character as being a sexless character from a sitcom.
