= Shane Black =

American filmmaker (born 1961)

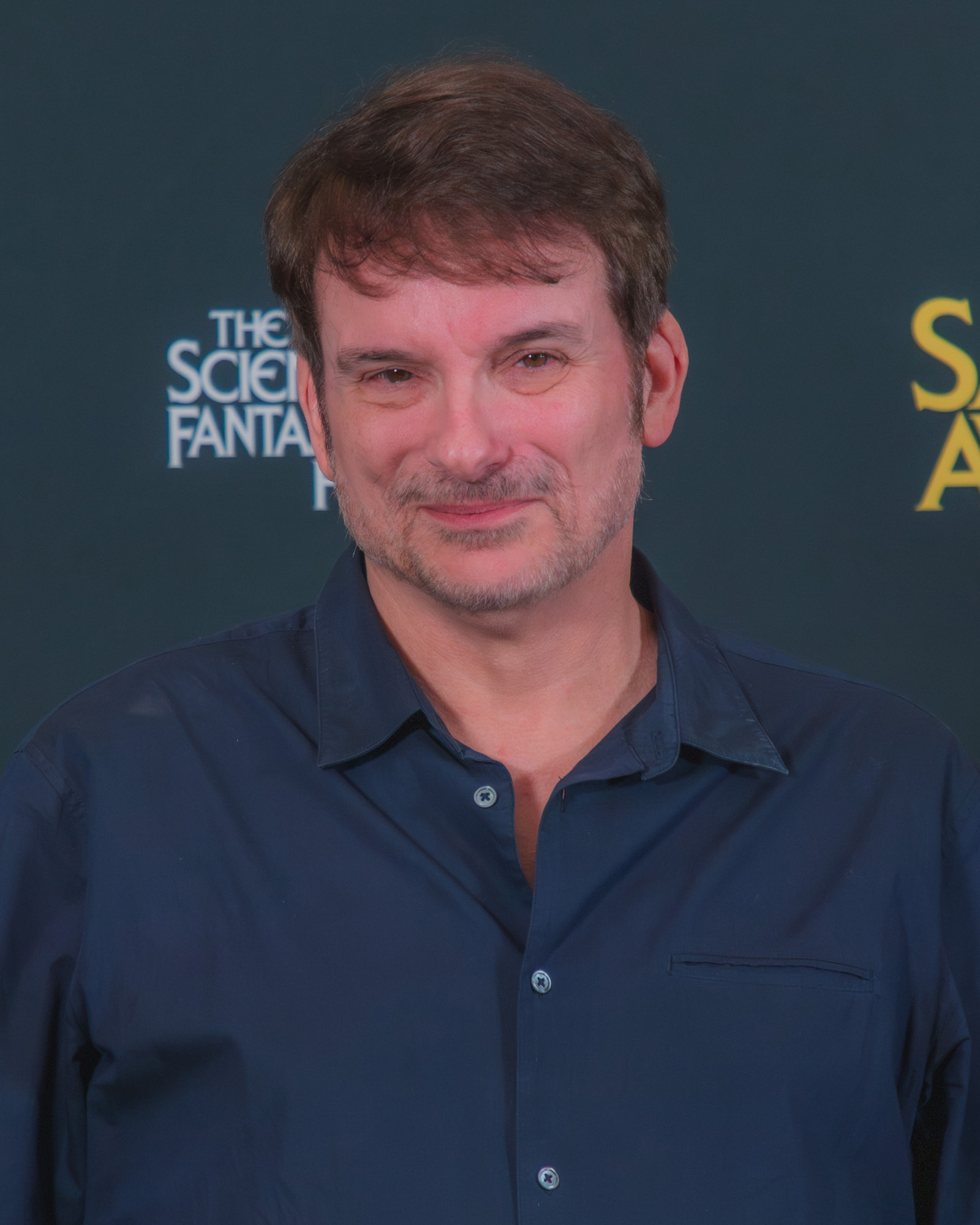
- Black in 2026
- Born: December 16, 1961 (age 64); Pittsburgh, Pennsylvania, U.S.
- Education: University of California, Los Angeles (BA)
- Occupations: Film director; film producer; screenwriter; actor
- Years active: 1986–present
- Notable work: Lethal Weapon; The Last Boy Scout; The Long Kiss Goodnight; Kiss Kiss Bang Bang; Iron Man 3; The Nice Guys; The Predator

Shane Black (born December 16, 1961) is an American screenwriter, film director, and actor, known for his distinctive style of action and action comedy films. He originated the Lethal Weapon franchise, and has also written such films as The Monster Squad (1987), The Last Boy Scout (1991), Last Action Hero (1993), and The Long Kiss Goodnight (1996). As an actor, Black is best known for his role as Hawkins in Predator (1987).

He made his directorial debut with the film Kiss Kiss Bang Bang in 2005. Black went on to write and direct Iron Man 3 (2013), The Nice Guys (2016), The Predator (2018) and Play Dirty (2025).

== Early life and education ==
Shane Black was born on December 16, 1961 in Pittsburgh, Pennsylvania, the son of Paul and Patricia Ann Black. His father was in the printing business, and helped Black develop his interest in hardboiled fiction, including the works of Mickey Spillane and the Matt Helm series. He grew up in the suburbs of Lower Burrell and Mount Lebanon, Pennsylvania, and later moved to Fullerton, California, during his sophomore year of high school. In Fullerton, he attended Sunny Hills High School.

He attended UCLA, where he majored in film and theater and graduated in 1983. During his senior year, he decided to make a living in the film industry once his classmate, Fred Dekker, showed him a science fiction script he did for an assignment.

Black's older brother, Terry Black, who also wrote short stories, decided to move into screenplays starting with 1988's Dead Heat, in which Shane had a cameo.

== Career ==
=== Screenwriting and acting ===
After graduating, Black worked as a typist for a temp agency, a data entry clerk for the 1984 Summer Olympics and an usher in a Westwood movie theater. Eventually he asked for financial support of his parents during the six-month development of a script, The Shadow Company, a supernatural thriller set in Vietnam. With Dekker's help, the script landed him an agent and several meetings with mid-level studio executives. This attracted 20th Century Fox executives, who were interested in having Black rewrite scripts.

Eventually Black wrote an action film script, Lethal Weapon, in about six weeks, which landed him a $250,000 deal with Warner Bros. During the rewrites, Black asked producer Joel Silver for a small acting role in another film Silver was preparing at the time, Predator, a film for which Black also made uncredited contributions to the script. At the same time, Black helped Dekker write The Monster Squad, which along with Lethal Weapon and Predator came out in 1987. Since then, Black has acted in five additional films and in two episodes for the TV series Dark Justice.

Once Warner Bros. requested a Lethal Weapon sequel, Black wrote the first draft of Lethal Weapon 2 with the help of novelist Warren Murphy. Although it was not used, Black said in later interviews that Warner Bros. did not like his original script for Lethal Weapon 2, which was also titled Play Dirty, because of how dark and violent it was and due to his decision to kill off main character Martin Riggs in the ending of the script. Black considers it to be his best work and the best script he has written.

Feeling burned out and having conflicts with the studio, Black left the project after six months, earning $125,000 out of a $250,000 payment split with Murphy, for his work. After two sabbatical years, Black decided to take on an old idea of his that emerged during the production of Lethal Weapon and turn it into a full screenplay. The result, The Last Boy Scout, earned him $1.75 million in 1991. Black earned $1 million for his rewrite of Last Action Hero in 1993. He set a record by receiving $4 million for writing The Long Kiss Goodnight in 1994.

=== Directing ===
Black made his directorial debut with 2005's Kiss Kiss Bang Bang, and later directed (and co-wrote with Drew Pearce) 2013's Iron Man 3, which as of 2024 ranks as the twenty-fifth-highest-grossing film of all time worldwide.

Black next directed and co-wrote Edge, a pilot for a potential series for Amazon Studios. The film was released on video on demand but not picked up for a series. He followed this with the action comedy The Nice Guys, starring Russell Crowe and Ryan Gosling, and produced by Joel Silver. Warner Bros. handled North American rights to the film, which was released on May 20, 2016.

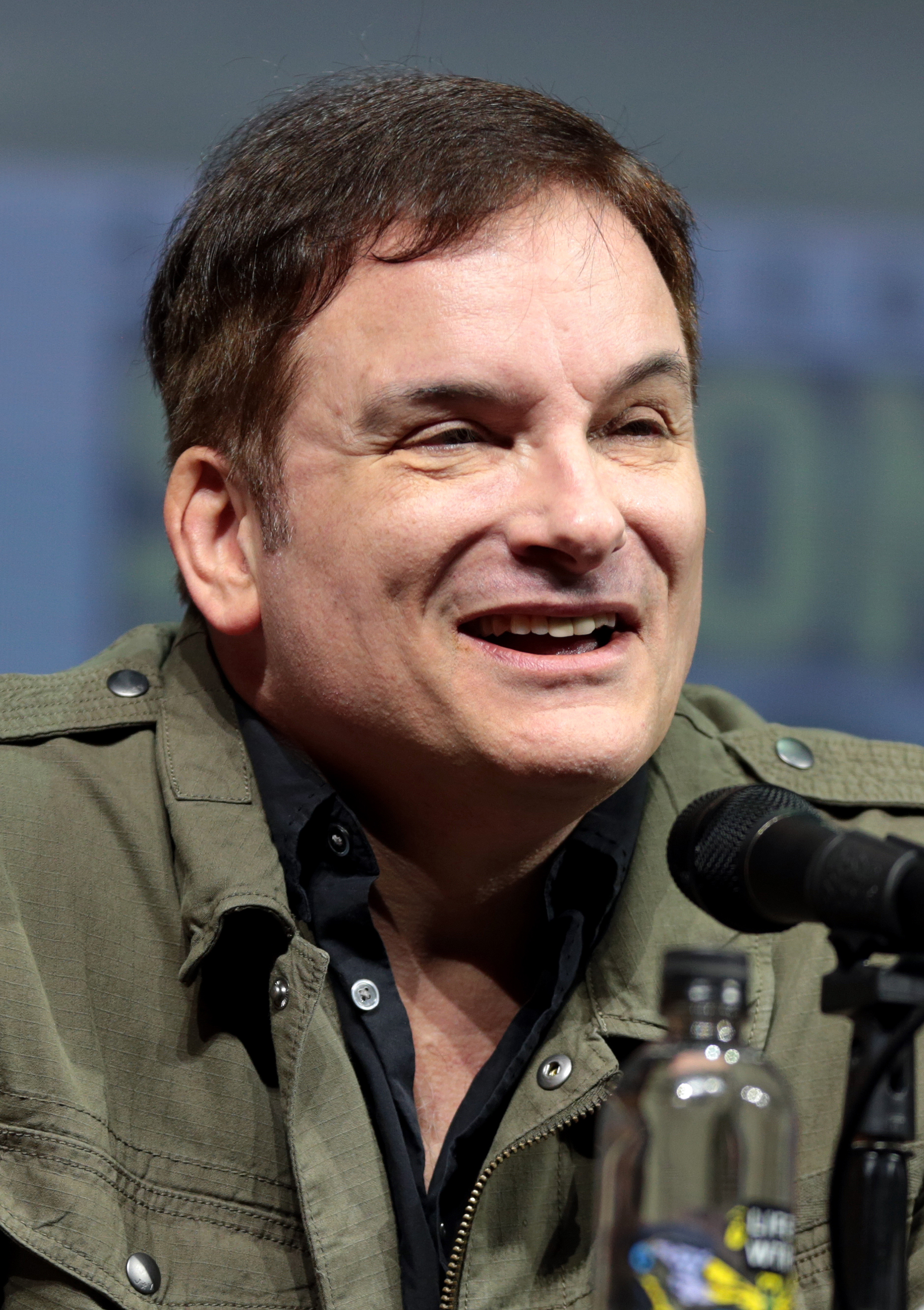
Black in 2018

Black next directed the fourth non-Alien-related film in the Predator series, The Predator, which he co-wrote with Fred Dekker. The film was released on September 14, 2018. Black hired his friend Steven Wilder Striegel for a minor, un-auditioned role in The Predator (as well as, previously, Iron Man 3 and The Nice Guys). Striegel spent six months in prison in 2010, having pleaded guilty to risk of injury to a child and enticing a minor by computer after he had attempted to lure a 14-year-old girl into a sexual relationship via email. Olivia Munn, an actress in The Predator, insisted on having a scene with Striegel removed after she discovered his history. Black initially defended his decision and his friend, but later rescinded them and released a public apology.

In 2024, Black directed the film Play Dirty, an adaptation of Donald E. Westlake's Parker novel series.

Black's unrealized projects included an adaptation of Doc Savage and The Destroyer, based on the series of paperback adventure novels that previously inspired the 1985 film Remo Williams: The Adventure Begins, starring Fred Ward. He was briefly attached by Warner Bros. in 2011 to direct a live-action American adaptation of the Japanese supernatural-thriller manga series Death Note, bringing his collaborators Anthony Bagarozzi and Charles Mondry to write the screenplay, replacing Charley and Vlas Parlapanides as the project's previous screenwriters. By 2014, he had left the project, due to reported creative differences and other commitments. Director Adam Wingard was eventually hired to helm the project by 2015.

== Style ==
Black has a recognizable writing style characterized by stories in which two main characters become friends, problematic protagonists who become better human beings at the end of the narrative, and trade witty dialogue, featuring labyrinthine crime plots, often set during Christmas time. The quips he incorporates into his scripts are referred to as "Shane Blackisms", in which jokes about the story situations are included in the scene directions of the script. He also sometimes directs comments at studio executives and script readers. Examples of these include:

From Lethal Weapon:

EXT. POSH BEVERLY HILLS HOME – TWILIGHT The kind of house that I'll buy if this movie is a huge hit. Chrome. Glass. Carved wood. Plus an outdoor solarium: A glass structure, like a greenhouse only there's a big swimming pool inside. This is a really great place to have sex.

From The Last Boy Scout:

Remember Jimmy's friend, Henry, who we met briefly near the opening of the film? Of course you do, you're a highly-paid reader or development person.

This approach, which Black summed as "more open to the reader" and aimed at "trying to keep people awake", was described by himself as a combination of William Goldman, his mentor in screenwriting, and Walter Hill, who had a "terse and Spartan, punchy prose". Black gave a list of techniques he uses when writing films in an interview with The Guardian.

Black explains that Christmas, which has been used as a backdrop in Lethal Weapon, Last Action Hero, The Long Kiss Goodnight, Kiss Kiss Bang Bang, Iron Man 3, The Nice Guys and Play Dirty (and in his original script for The Last Boy Scout, although references to the date have been almost entirely eliminated from the film), is a touchstone for him, explaining:

Christmas represents a little stutter in the march of days, a hush in which we have a chance to assess and retrospect our lives. I tend to think also that it just informs as a backdrop. The first time I noticed it was Three Days of the Condor, the Sydney Pollack film, where Christmas in the background adds this really odd, chilling counterpoint to the espionage plot. I also think that Christmas is just a thing of beauty, especially as it applies to places like Los Angeles, where it's not so obvious, and you have to dig for it, like little nuggets. One night, on Christmas Eve, I walked past a Mexican lunch wagon serving tacos, and I saw this little string, and on it was a little broken plastic figurine, with a light bulb inside it, of the Virgin Mary. And I thought, that's just a little hidden piece of magic. You know, all around the city are little slices, little icons of Christmas, that are as effective and beautiful in and of themselves as any 40-foot Christmas tree on the lawn of the White House. So that, in a lot of words, is the answer.

== Filmography ==
=== Film ===
Year	Title	Director	Writer	Producer	Notes
1987	Lethal Weapon	No	Yes	No	
1987	The Monster Squad	No	Yes	No	
1989	Lethal Weapon 2	No	Story	No	
1991	The Last Boy Scout	No	Yes	Executive	
1993	Last Action Hero	No	Yes	No	
1996	The Long Kiss Goodnight	No	Yes	Yes	
2005	Kiss Kiss Bang Bang	Yes	Yes	No	Directorial debut
2013	Iron Man 3	Yes	Yes	No	
2016	The Nice Guys	Yes	Yes	No	
2018	The Predator	Yes	Yes	No	
2025	Play Dirty	Yes	Yes	Executive	

Uncredited script doctor

- Predator (1987)
- Dead Heat (1988)
- The Hunt for Red October (1990)
- RoboCop 3 (1993)
- Iron Man (2008)
- Battle: Los Angeles (2011)

Unproduced

- Shadow Company (1988)
- Sgt. Rock (1989)
- Wild Wild West (1992)
- Fear Itself (1995)
- Lethal Weapon 5 (2008)
- Cold Warrior (2008)
- Doc Savage (2010)
- Death Note (2011)
- The Destroyer (2014)
- Hobbs & Shaw (2017)
- The Avengers (2018)

=== Television ===
Year	Title	Director	Writer	Producer	Notes
2015	Edge	Yes	Yes	Yes	Pilot
2016	Lethal Weapon	No	Story	No	Episode "Pilot"

=== Acting credits ===
Year	Title	Role	Notes
1986	Night of the Creeps	Cop In Police Station	Uncredited
1987	Predator	Radio Operator Rick Hawkins	
1988	Dead Heat	Patrolman	
1990	The Hunt for Red October	USS Reuben James Crewman	Uncredited
1991–1993	Dark Justice	Caldecott Rush	3 episodes
1993	RoboCop 3	Officer Donnelly	
1993	Mike the Detective	Mike	Short film
1994	Night Realm	Unknown	
1997	As Good as It Gets	Brian, Cafe 24 manager	
1997	An Alan Smithee Film: Burn Hollywood Burn	Himself	Cameo
2002	The Boy Scout	Henchman #2	Short film
2007	Monkeys	Unknown	
2013	Agent Carter	Disembodied Voice	Voice only, short film
2015	Any Day	Gino	
2016	Swing State	Luke	
2018	Wild Nothing	Phil	Short film

== Awards and honors ==
Black received the Distinguished Screenwriter Award from the Austin Film Festival October 21, 2006. In 2005, he received the Best Original Screenplay award for Kiss Kiss Bang Bang from the San Diego Film Critics Association.
