= Embassy Row Hotel =

Hotel in Washington DC

The Ven at Embassy Row, Washington, D.C., a Tribute Portfolio Hotel
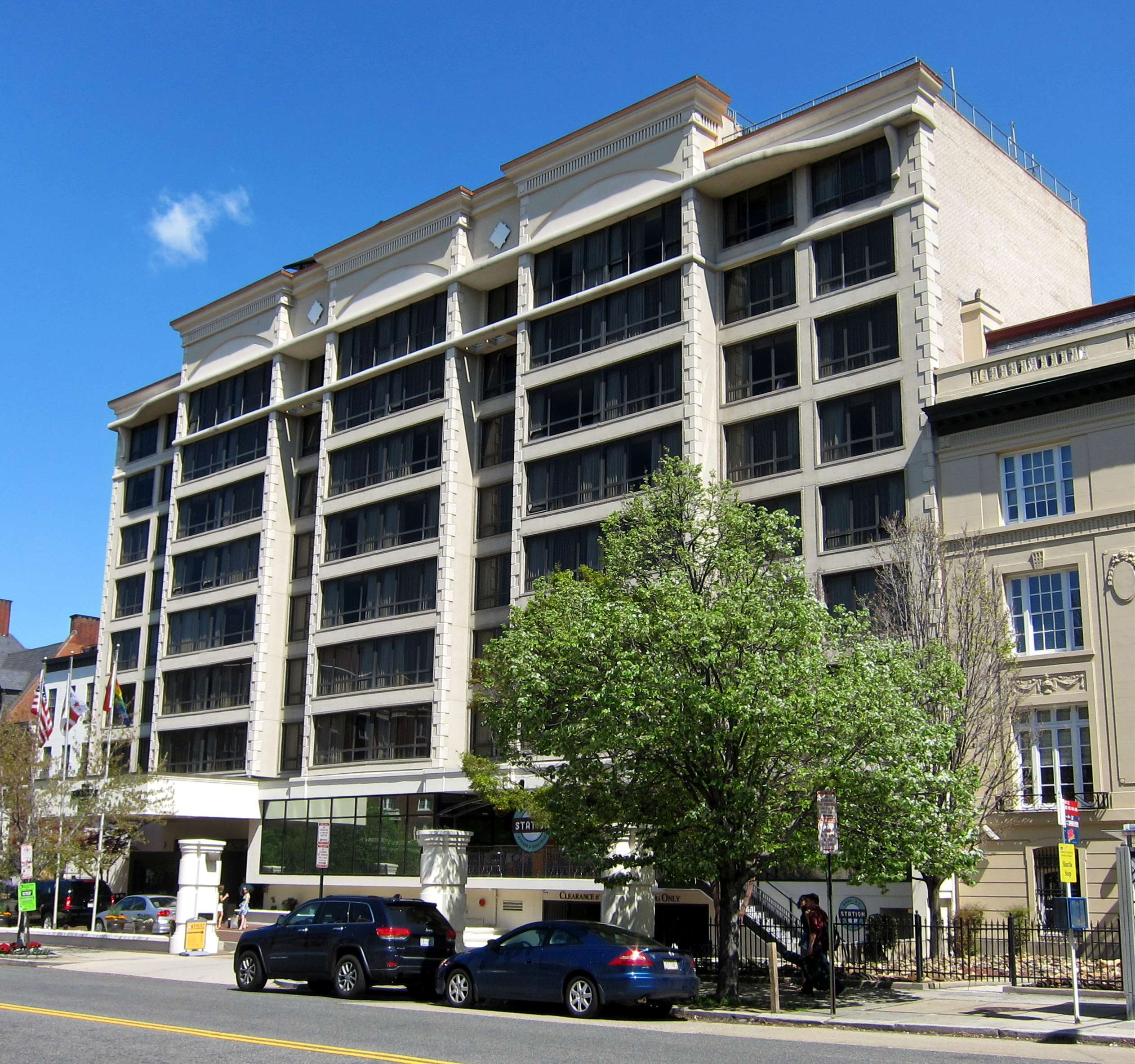
- Interactive map of the The Ven at Embassy Row, Washington, D.C., a Tribute Portfolio Hotel area

General information
- Location: United States, Washington, D.C.
- Coordinates: 38.910556°N 77.045556°W
- Opening: 1970
- Owner: Lowe Enterprises
- Operator: Crescent Hotels

Height
- Height: 99.1 feet (30.2 m)

Technical details
- Floor count: 9

Other information
- Number of rooms: 231 rooms
- Parking: 110 spaces

The Ven at Embassy Row, Washington, D.C., a Tribute Portfolio Hotel is a hotel owned by Lowe Enterprises located at 2015 Massachusetts Avenue NW in Washington, D.C., in the United States. The hotel, a Modernist structure which opened in 1970 as The Embassy Row Hotel, is in the Embassy Row neighborhood of the city, and takes its name from the area. The hotel is considered a "landmark" in the city.

== Construction and early reception ==
The Embassy Row Hotel was financed and constructed by Dr. Cyrus Katzen, a local dental surgeon who became a multi-millionaire by investing heavily in real estate. Other investors included securities lawyer G. Bradford Cook, former hotel manager Klaus P. Reincke, and three anonymous investors from Nashville, Tennessee.

At the time, the 2000 block of Massachusetts Avenue NW consisted of two- and three-story Victorian townhouses and mansions, many of them the homes or former homes of very wealthy and politically prominent people. A zoning exemption allowed the nine-story hotel to be built there.

The structure opened on December 15, 1970. Alice Roosevelt Longworth, 86-year-old daughter of President Theodore Roosevelt and wife of former Speaker of the House Nicholas Longworth, cut the ceremonial ribbon. Accompanying her were Walter Washington, Mayor of the District of Columbia, and Guillermo Sevilla Sacasa, Nicaraguan ambassador to the United States and dean of the diplomatic corps. (Roosevelt occupied a mansion next door to the hotel, and lived there until her death.) Sculptor Victor Lamkay contributed sculpture for the lobby,

=== Aesthetic reception ===
The Modernist structure was deeply criticized by The Washington Post architecture critic Wolf Von Eckardt. He called it "bland", "uncharming", and "a triumph of Middle America—the assertion of nouveau riche, middle-brow culture that is all at once touching, camp and distressing." Katzen, a neighbor of Von Eckardt's, famously wrote a long letter to The Washington Post taking issue with factual errors and personal attacks in Von Eckardt's architectural review. Katzen offered (tongue in cheek) his dental services, writing, "I would be glad to see him in my capacity as a dentist and extract his foot from his mouth at his earliest convenience." Von Eckardt had Katzen's letter published in full in The Washington Post.

Its architectural reputation did not improve over time. Professor of architecture Roger K. Lewis called it a "latter day architectural lapse" in 1986.

== Operational history ==
=== Early operations ===
General Hotels Corp. was the first company to manage the hotel. In January 1972, the hotel saw a spectacular theft when a thief stole $10,000 in jewelry from the room of Jeanette Rockefeller, wife of Arkansas Governor Winthrop Rockefeller (and heir to the Rockefeller family fortune).

The Embassy Row Hotel was the location of a major political scandal that erupted in 1978. U.S. Senator Herman Talmadge and his then-administrative assistant, Daniel Minchew, began diverting campaign funds to Talmadge's personal use in 1973. Transfers of cash usually occurred when Minchew withdrew funds from campaign bank accounts and delivered the cash to Talmadge in his Senate office. On only a single occasion did Minchew deliver cash elsewhere, and that occurred at The Embassy Row Hotel in November 1974 after Talmadge gave a speech there. Talmadge was found guilty of diverting funds, and censured by the Senate on October 11, 1979.

In 1979, the hotel was the site of secret negotiations regarding a major act of political terrorism. On September 21, 1976, former Chilean ambassador Orlando Letelier was killed by a car bomb on September 21, 1976, on Sheridan Circle—just a hundred yards from the Embassy Row Hotel. Two Chileans, the current and the former head of the Dirección de Inteligencia Nacional (DINA, the Chilean secret police), and an American in the employ of DINA were accused of the crime. A DINA agent, Capt. Armando Fernandez Larios, offered to testify against the conspirators if the United States dropped extradition proceedings against him. Negotiations over the agent's testimony and extradition occurred at the Embassy Row Hotel, although no agreement was ever reached. All three conspirators were later found guilty.

=== Ownership change and the 1981-1982 strike ===
The first major change in the hotel's ownership came in 1981. Since its opening, the hotel had never done good business, and often lost money. In 1980, the loss was more than $1 million. In September 1981, a consortium of 20 wealthy Republican Party (GOP) donors purchased The Embassy Row for $14 million with a goal of making it a high-end luxury hotel catering specifically to GOP politicians, donors, and others. The consortium consisted mostly of individuals involved in the Oklahoma oil drilling and petroleum refining business, including J.D. Allen, Robert A. Hefner III, Steve Jernigan, Virgil Tilly, and Lew O. Ward. The consortium was led by G. Bradford Cook and Joe M. Rogers, a former Republican National Committee Finance Committee chairman. The consortium intended to give the hotel a new name, Hotel Trianon, and give it a $3 million French Baroque renovation.

The renovation was delayed for two reasons. First, occupancy rates at the hotel dropped to lows not seen since World War II. Second, the hotel suffered a debilitating strike. The hotel withdrew from the Hotel Association of Washington, D.C.'s master contract in October 1981, a move which angered the association and signalled management's intent to negotiate a separate contract. The hotel staff union, Local 25 HERE, struck on November 17 when the hotel owners demanded 90 days to review all staff and fire whomever they chose without cause, due process, or notice. Management also sought cuts in pension and health care benefits. Occupancy rates dropped to just 50 percent, 20 percent lower than the city-wide average and well below the break-even point. Third, financing for the hotel purchase and renovation came under fire by labor unions and others in Tennessee. The hotel was purchased with a $9.8 million loan from Security Federal Savings and Loan in Nashville. The single loan represented 60 percent of the commercial loan business of the savings and loan association (S&L) and its only out-of-state loan—which led to questions about whether undue influence was applied to the S&L to make the loan, and whether it imperiled the S&L's financial stability. The consortium said that the strike had delayed the renovation two months and the hotel would likely lose $1.5 million in 1982, but that nevertheless the renovation would proceed.

The renovation did not proceed, and the strike continued. Losses were so high that the consortium now lacked the means to finance the upgrades. Lincoln Hotels, a subsidiary of Lincoln Property Company, purchased a 10 percent interest in The Embassy Row Hotel for an undisclosed sum in May 1982. The company also took over management of the property, and said it would renovate the structure in an attempt to turn The Embassy Row into a five-star hotel.

Lincoln Hotels quickly negotiated an end to the strike. The eight-month strike ended on July 12, 1982, when the Embassy Row Hotel signed a new contract with Local 25. The Republican-led consortium won nothing: The new agreement was nearly identical to the hotel association's master contract (with very minor changes).

=== 1983 renovation ===
The hotel finally underwent a $5 million renovation in 1983 to turn it into a luxury hotel. The newly renovated hotel was rededicated in late April 1983. Alejandro Orfila, the Secretary General of the Organization of American States, performed the ribbon-cutting. Ann Grey, an interior decorator known for her work on deluxe hotels in the United States, redesigned the hotel interior. Many of the hotel's small rooms were enlarged and 28 suites created. Other changes included offering a free, full breakfast to all guests, offering luxury bath and toilet items, putting television sets into armoires rather than hanging them from brackets on the walls, and adding an herb garden on the roof for the restaurant's use. Le Consulat was closed, and a new restaurant named La Reserve opened with a lower-priced menu.

The Embassy Row Hotel received a four-star rating after the renovation. A "royal/presidential" suite was added to the top floor by combining several rooms. Within the year, it hosted Prince Philip, Duke of Edinburgh (who requested that a private dining room be added to the suite) and Italian Prime Minister Bettino Craxi (who had a hotline to Rome installed in the suite). That same year, the Federal City Club (a private club for wealthy men and women) leased space within the hotel while it searched for a permanent home.

The renovated hotel proved popular with the rich and famous. The following year saw New York City real estate executive Jerome Zipkin, department store heiress Betsy Bloomingdale, cosmetics and perfume magnate Estée Lauder, and actress Mary Martin stay at the hotel.

The hotel also proved popular for scandals. The Iran–Contra affair broke open on November 25, 1986, when the Reagan administration disclosed that funds generated by arms sales to Iran had been used to support rebels in Nicaragua fighting the communist regime of Daniel Ortega. The arms sales violated a U.S. embargo on sales to Iran, and the diversion of funds violated federal law barring use of federal funds to support the rebels (or contras). Marine Corps Lieutenant Colonel Oliver North was fired from the National Security Council the same day for orchestrating the arms sales and funds diversion. On November 24, North met for several hours with fellow conspirators Richard Secord, a retired Air Force Major General; Albert Hakim, an Iranian American businessman; and Thomas C. Green, a prominent D.C. criminal attorney who claimed to be legal counsel for North, Secord and Hakim. Hours after being fired on November 25, North, Green, and Secord met for several hours at the Embassy Row Hotel. After the meeting, North and Green returned to North's office in the Old Executive Office Building and assisted North's secretary, Fawn Hall, in smuggling documents smuggling classified documents out of the building. The Los Angeles Times reported that congressional investigators and legal experts both agreed that the conspiracy to attempt to cover up the Iran-Contra Affair began at these two meetings.

But still the hotel did not do good business. In 1985, occupancy rates fell to 50 percent. Director of Marketing Maureen Curry was forced to lower rates and seek motorcoach tours to fill rooms. Although occupancy rose to 60 percent, it was still not breaking even. While the hotel did excellent business during the workweek, it was "dead empty" on weekends (according to staff).

=== Block Hotel Corp. and bankruptcy ===
Block Hotel Corp. purchased The Embassy Row Hotel in September 1988 for an undisclosed sum. The purchase included several individual investors, among whom was former U.S. Senator George McGovern. Block Hotel said it intended to make further renovations to the structure. Block Hotel and the investors established a holding company, Embassy Row Hotel Investors, to take title to the property.

Just two months later, in November 1988, the land beneath the hotel was sold. The land belonged to Travelers Corp. (a large insurance company), which sold it to Allan J. Riley, president of Riley Real Estate Investments. The 16,540-square-foot (1,537 m^{2}) property exchanged hands for an undisclosed sum. The Washington Post reported that the hotel paid $74,076 per month in 1988 to use the land.

The Embassy Row Hotel continued to struggle, however. By 1991, CapStar Hotel Company had taken over management of the property and La Reserve had closed in favor of yet another restaurant, Lucie. On June 26, 1992, Embassy Row Hotel Investors declared bankruptcy, claiming more than $10 million in debts. The hotel was taken over by MBL Life Assurance. It underwent another renovation in early 1994, at which time Lucie changed its name to Bistro Twenty-Fifteen (although chef Jim Papovich was retained). A piano lounge was added to the front of the restaurant.

=== Rapid ownership changes ===
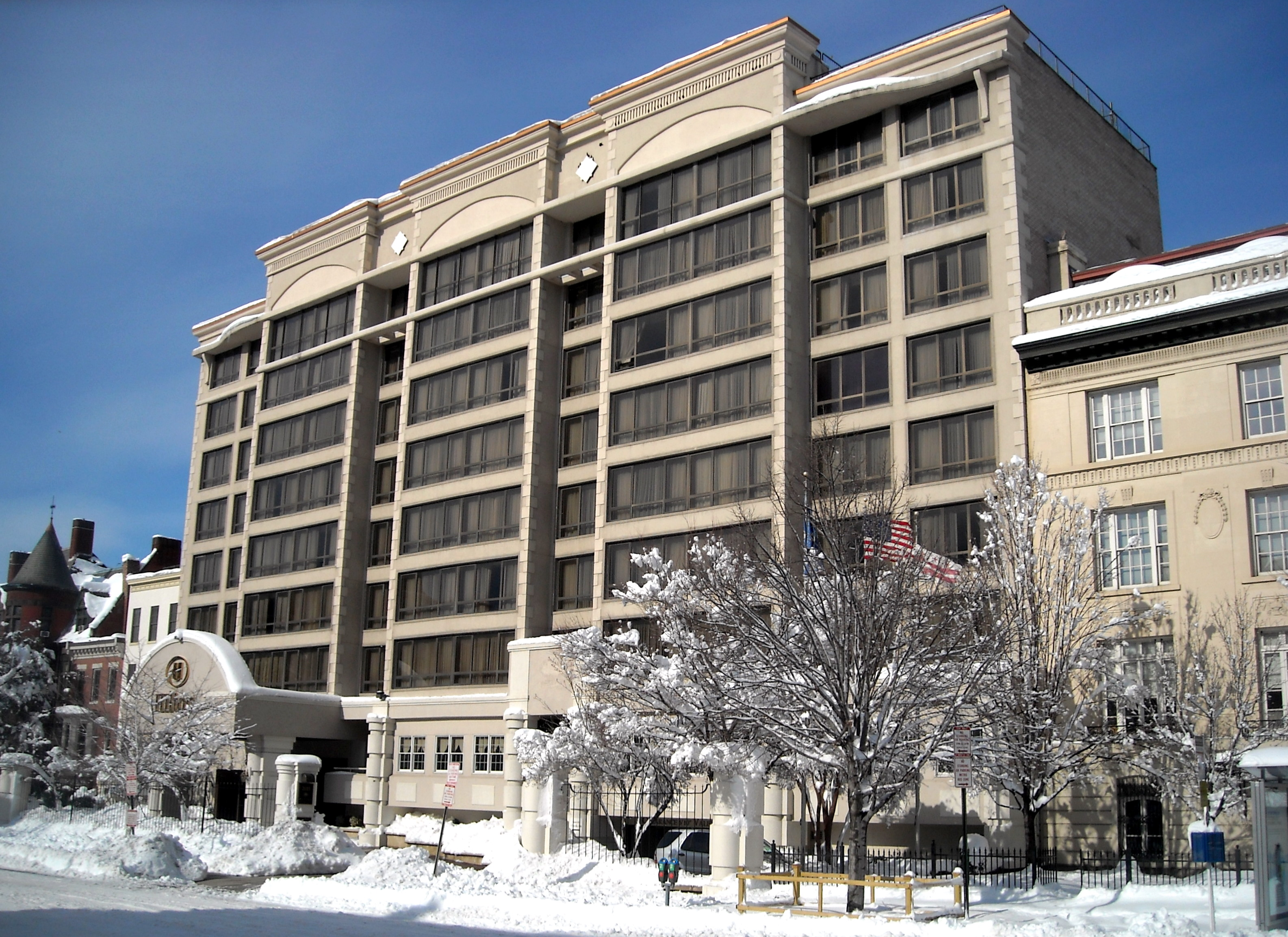
The hotel in 2010 when it was known as the Hilton Embassy Row.

On August 23, 1996, CapStar purchase the Embassy Row Hotel (and four other hotel properties) from MBL Life Assurance in a deal totaling $68.4 million. The purchase was finalized on December 21. CapStar planned a $2 million renovation, and signed an agreement with Hilton Hotels & Resorts to manage the hotel and brand it as the Hilton Washington Embassy Row. CapStar increased the cost of the renovation to $3.3 million in 1997. It also significantly raised room rates while offering little in the way of new luxuries or services, angering some recurring guests. Among the changes wrought by the renovation was the relocation of the restaurant from the first floor to the basement. It was renamed International Marketplace, its long-time chef left, and it began serving more casual fare. CapStar later split into two companies, Meristar Hospitality Corp. and Meristar Hotels and Resorts (which itself underwent a name change to Interstate Hotels & Resorts).

Hilton's management of the hotel rapidly improved its finances. In 2004, the hotel ranked 21st on the list of top-performing hotels, according to Lodging Hospitality magazine (an industry trade journal). In 2005, it was ranked 15th, with total sales of $13.1 million a year and sales per room of $67,875 a year. Its average occupancy rate now reached 83 percent.

In February 2006, the Blackstone Group (owner of Hilton hotels) purchased the Hilton Washington Embassy Row outright as part of its acquisition of MeriStar. Blackstone's Hilton Hotels & Resorts continued to manage the property. But in September 2006, Blackstone put the Hilton Washington Embassy Row and six other D.C. area hotels up for sale yet again. CapStar's other spin-off company, Interstate Hotels & Resorts, purchased a 20 percent interest in the hotel on December 3, 2006. Harte Holdings, an investment and development firm based in Ireland, participated in the purchase. Both firms agreed to put up funds for yet another renovation.

Yet another ownership change came less than five months later. Willow Hotels purchased the property on May 4, 2007, for $69 million. The company financed the purchase with $44.2 in debt. Willow Hotels had trouble covering its debt service payments, however, after occupancy rates at the hotel fell significantly lower during the 2008-2011 recession. Occupancy plunged to just 64 percent in 2009, although it rebounded to 85.6 percent by the first quarter of 2011. This was enough, however, to cover only about 91 percent of the debt payments, and Willow Hotels was forced to dip into its reserves to cover the balance.

Willow Hotels hired an outside firm, LNR Partners, in 2011 to service the debt while it negotiated with lenders to extend the maturity date for the loan prior to any renovation or rebranding. Willow also sought to rebrand and reposition the hotel, and hired an outside firm to find a potential buyer.

The Embassy Row Hotel was one of seven hotels which took the lead in 2010 in negotiating a new collective bargaining agreement with Local 25 HERE. After 18 months of picketing and tough negotiations, a new contract was reached in April 2012. The contract, which ran 5.5 years, included a wage increase, a 50 percent employer contribution to the pension fund, a penalties for employers to pay workers late. The master contract affected all 22 of the Hotel Association's members, which included some of the biggest hotels in the area.

In June 2012, Hilton Hotels ceased to manage the property, when both Hilton and Willow Hotels allowed the management contract to expire and the hotel again became The Embassy Row Hotel.

=== 2013 sale ===
On November 19, 2013, Lowe Enterprises purchased the Embassy Row Hotel from Willow Hotels for an undisclosed price. Also investing in the hotel were The Guardian Life Insurance Company of America and Allstate Insurance Co. Lowe Enterprises said it would convert the Embassy Row into an independent boutique hotel, and assigned a subsidiary, Destination Hotels & Resorts, to manage the property. Lowe said it intended to make extensive upgrades to guest rooms and public areas (including the lobby).

Lowe began a year-long, $15 million renovation in March 2014. The two-level rooftop pool was refurbished, reopening in July 2014. Beginning in November 2014, the hotel's guest rooms, common areas and meeting spaces were refurbished. The main lobby was relocated from the lower level to the first floor, with the addition of a bar and takeout cafe. Finally, the main entrance was replaced.

=== 2021 rebranding ===
The hotel was rebranded as The Ven at Embassy Row, Washington, D.C., a Tribute Portfolio Hotel in March 2021, joining Marriott Hotels's Tribute Portfolio brand, following remodeling that themed the hotel around the Scandinavian concept of "hygge," roughly translated as "cozy contentment."

== Description ==
The Embassy Row Hotel was constructed in the Modernist architectural style. Its exterior is of white brick.

As of 2007, the Embassy Row Hotel had 10,000 square feet (930 m^{2}) of banquet and meeting room space (up from 7,500 square feet (700 m^{2}) in 1996), a rooftop swimming pool, a 110-space underground parking garage, and a fitness center. Originally, guests entered the hotel beneath a spartan brown metal and glass canopy and were confront by a set of narrow steps. One set of steps led down to the more luxurious and open lobby, while the other led upstairs to the Le Consulat restaurant. The hotel tried to change the color of its awning from brown to blue in 1978, but its request was turned down because the hotel lies within the boundaries of the Dupont Circle Historic District.

The hotel originally had 224 rooms, but sources have since reported that it has 224 (1975), 196 (1982), 203 (1982), 200 (1983), 203 (1988), 195 (1996), 193 (2005), 200 (2007) and 231 (2014).

When it opened, the Embassy Row Hotel had two restaurants, the luxurious Le Consulat and the middle-brow Cafe Jardin. Le Consulat was rated one of the best restaurants in the city when it opened, although changes in management and chefs led to a significant decline in its food and service by 1972. It had but a single restaurant by 2007.

== In popular culture ==
Former United States Army counterterrorist commando Eric L. Haney wrote in his 2002 memoir Inside Delta Force that his Delta Force "graduation exercise" (which consisted of eluding the Federal Bureau of Investigation for as long as he could) began in the Embassy Row Hotel with a meeting in the Le Consulat restaurant.

The hotel is a popular one for fiction novelists as well. One of the earliest mentions in a fiction novel is in Bill Pronzini and Barry N. Malzberg's 1977 thriller novel, Acts of Mercy. It has since been the subject of plottings, murders, conspiracy and other nefarious schemes in Robert Ludlum's 1992 comic thriller The Road to Omaha, Mary-Jane Deeb's 2000 murder mystery Cocktails and Murder on the Potomac, Brad Thor's 2006 terrorist thriller Blowback, Richard Curtis Williams' 2011 thriller A Trilogy Called Tribes!, and Nicholas Hazel's 2012 thriller The Cyrus Cylinder.

The hotel has occasionally also appeared in nonfiction. It is mentioned in Bill McGuire's 2003 book about cultural exchanges, Tales of An American Culture Vulture and in Marlene Stewart Jones' memoir about charitable religious work, Sacred Memories.
