= List of Delta Force members =

US Army special operations force members

USASOC's shoulder sleeve insignia worn by Delta operators.

This list of Delta Force members includes both current and former notable members of the United States Army's 1st Special Forces Operational Detachment-Delta, a tier one special mission unit and part of Joint Special Operations Command.

== List ==
- Eldon A. Bargewell: Retired Lieutenant General. Former Commander of Delta Force from 1996 to 1998. Served multiple tours of duty with MACVSOG during Vietnam War.
- Charles Beckwith: Vietnam War veteran and inaugural commander of Delta Force from 1977 to 1980. Retired after the failure of Operation Eagle Claw.
- Pete Blaber: Retired Delta Force Commander.
- Kenneth Bowra: Served with Delta Force from 1983 to 1988. Former Commanding Officer of Army 5th Special Forces Group from 1991 to 1993. Served with MACVSOG during Vietnam War in 1971–1972.
- William G. Boykin: Retired Lieutenant General. Former Commander of Delta Force from 1992 to 1994, including service in Somalia during the Battle of Mogadishu.
- Jonathan P. Braga: Lieutenant General, the current commander for the United States Army Special Operations Command who assumed the role on August 12, 2021. Braga held many leadership positions within Delta. Before Delta, Braga served with the 7th Special Forces Group from 1995 to 2001 as Operational Detachment-A commander and company XO.
- William "Chief" Carlson (1959 - 2003): joined Delta Force in the mid-1990s after serving in the 75th Ranger Regiment and Army special forces. While working with the CIA's Special Activities Center, he was killed in action on October 25, 2003, during a mission in Afghanistan, where he sacrificed himself to protect his team.
- John R. Cavaiani: Served at the unit from 1984 to 1989. Before his time at the unit, he served in MACV-SOG where he earned the Medal of Honor.
- Christopher T. Donahue: Actively serving General. Currently serving as the commanding general of United States Army Europe and Africa and commander of Allied Land Command since 2024. Donahue served previously with the 3rd Ranger Battalion and the 2nd Ranger Battalion before passing Delta selection, eventually commanding the unit.
- William F. Garrison: Retired Major General. Former Commander of Delta Force from 1985 to 1989. Commanding officer of Task Force Ranger during the Battle of Mogadishu.
- Gary Gordon (1960–1993): Medal of Honor recipient. Killed in action, on 3 October 1993, during the Battle of Mogadishu.
- David L. Grange: Former Commanding Officer of 75th Ranger Regiment from 1991 to 1993. Served with Delta Force as Squadron Commander during Operation Urgent Fury in 1983. Former Deputy Commander of Delta Force from June 1990 to July 1991.
- Eric L. Haney: Served with the unit from 1979 to 1986. Wrote the book Inside Delta Force, upon which the television series The Unit is based. He served in Operation Eagle Claw, Operation Urgent Fury and Operation Just Cause.
- Gary L. Harrell: Retired Major General. Former Commander of Delta Force from 1998 to 2000. Served as a troop commander during invasion of Panama in 1989 and served as C Squadron Commander during the Battle of Mogadishu in Somalia in October 1993.
- Paul R. Howe: Delta Force veteran of Operation Just Cause in Panama and Operation Gothic Serpent. Awarded the Silver Star Medal for heroism during Battle of Mogadishu in October 1993.
- Austin S. Miller: Commanded Delta Force during the Iraq War, served as the final commander of NATO's Resolute Support Mission and U.S. Forces – Afghanistan. Veteran of Battle of Mogadishu in Somalia in October 1993.
- Mike Morton: Ultramarathon world champion. He won the IAU 24 Hour World Championship in 2012 while setting the American 24-hour record (172.457 miles) and was named 2012 Ultrarunner of the Year.
- Mark J. O'Neil: Retired Major General. Former Commander of Delta Force from 2009 to 2011. Served multiple tours of duty with 1st SFOD-D including Troop and Squadron Commander.
- Thomas Payne: A Sergeant Major in Delta Force. When he was a Sergeant First Class, he was involved in a hostage rescue on the 22 October 2015 at an ISIS prison in Kirkuk, Iraq, which about 70 Iraqi prisoners were rescued and Delta Force MSG Joshua Wheeler was killed in action. For his action, he was awarded Distinguished Service Cross, which was later upgraded to the Medal of Honor, and awarded 11 September 2020. Sergeant Major Payne would be the first living Delta Force Medal of Honor recipient, the third Delta Force Medal of Honor recipient after MSG Gary Gordon and SFC Randy Shughart who died in the 1993 Battle of Mogadishu, and the first Medal of Honor recipient of Operation Inherent Resolve.
- Bennet S. Sacolick: Retired Lieutenant General. Former Commander of Delta Force from April 2003 to July 2005. Sacolick had previously served with the 2nd Ranger battalion and the 7th Special Forces Group where he saw combat in Central America including the Salvadoran Civil War and the United States invasion of Panama. Saccolick has also commanded the John F. Kennedy Special Warfare Center and School from August 2010 to August 2012.
- Peter Schoomaker: Retired General. Former Commander of Delta Force from 1989 to 1992 and later commander of JSOC, USASOC and SOCOM.
- Randy Shughart (1958–1993): Medal of Honor recipient. Killed in action, on 3 October 1993, during the Battle of Mogadishu.
- Christopher Speer (1973–2002 †): A U.S. Army combat medic in 1st SFOD-D. Wounded in action, on 27 July 2002, in Afghanistan, during Operation Enduring Freedom. Later died at Ramstein Air Base, Germany on 6 August 2002, and received international attention after his killer and Canadian citizen Omar Khadr (who was 15 years old at the time of Speer's death) was imprisoned and allegedly tortured by the United States, violating Canadian child soldier amnesty laws.
- Raymond A. Thomas: Retired General. Served with the unit as Operations Officer, Troop Commander, Executive Officer and B Squadron Commander from 1992 to 1994 and 1996 to 1999. He was also the commander of Joint Special Operations Command from 2014 to 2016 and United States Special Operations Command from 2016 to 2019.
- Larry Vickers: Retired Master Sergeant with 20 years of service. Participated in Operation Acid Gambit.
- Mike R. Vining: Retired Sergeant Major in Delta Force, serving in the unit from its inception in 1978 to 1999. Part of the inaugural class of the Operator Training Course.
- Michael R. Weimer: 17th Sergeant Major of the Army, former Delta operator. Served in 7th Special Forces Group (Airborne) and numerous billets within United States Army Special Operations Command, including Command Sergeant Major.
- Joshua Wheeler †): Master Sergeant in Delta Force, and Silver Star recipient (posthumously) who was the first American service member killed in action as a result of enemy fire while fighting ISIS militants. He was also the first American to be killed in action in Iraq since November 2011.

== See also ==
- List of Navy SEALs
