= List of The Unit episodes =

The Unit is an American drama television series. It began airing on CBS on March 7, 2006, in the United States, as a mid-season replacement. Created by David Mamet, The Unit follows a top-secret United States Army special forces team and their missions abroad, in addition to the effect their careers have on their wives and girlfriends. The Unit began its first season on March 7, 2006, and concluded on May 16, 2006; the second season debuted on September 19, 2006, and completed on May 8, 2007. The third season started on September 25, 2007, with a hiatus occurring after the 11th episode due to the 2007–08 Writers Guild of America strike. The show was picked up for a fourth season by CBS on May 12, 2008. The fourth season began on September 28, 2008, and ended on May 10, 2009, which was also the series finale as the show was not renewed for a fifth season. A total of 69 episodes of the series aired.

The first three seasons have been released to Region 1 DVD by 20th Century Fox in the form of individual season box sets, which include deleted scenes, behind-the-scenes featurettes, and commentaries. 20th Century Fox has also released both sets to Region 2 DVD in the United Kingdom. Season four was released to Region 1 on September 29, 2009, and was released on February 22, 2010, in Region 2.

== Series overview ==
| Season | Episodes | Originally released | |
| Season | Episodes | First released | Last released |
|---|---|---|---|
| 1 | 13 | March 7, 2006 | May 16, 2006 |
| 2 | 23 | September 19, 2006 | May 8, 2007 |
| 3 | 11 | September 25, 2007 | December 18, 2007 |
| 4 | 22 | September 28, 2008 | May 10, 2009 |

== Episodes ==
=== Season 1 (2006) ===
| No. overall | No. in season | Title | Directed by | Written by | Original release date | Prod. code | US viewers (millions) | Rank (week) |
|---|---|---|---|---|---|---|---|---|
| 1 | 1 | "First Responders" | Davis Guggenheim | David Mamet | March 7, 2006 | 1ALF79 | 18.50 | 10 |
| 2 | 2 | "Stress" | Guy Ferland | David Mamet | March 14, 2006 | 1ALF01 | 18.07 | 5 |
| 3 | 3 | "200th Hour" | Steve Gomer | Sharon Lee Watson & Carol Flint | March 21, 2006 | 1ALF04 | 15.50 | 10 |
| 4 | 4 | "True Believers" | Oz Scott | Shawn Ryan & Eric L. Haney | March 28, 2006 | 1ALF02 | 16.08 | 13 |
| 5 | 5 | "Non-Permissive Environment" | Ron Lagomarsino | Lynn Mamet & Paul Redford | April 4, 2006 | 1ALF03 | 15.44 | 10 |
| 6 | 6 | "Security" | David Mamet | David Mamet | April 11, 2006 | 1ALF06 | 14.12 | 12 |
| 7 | 7 | "Dedication" | Helen Shaver | Paul Redford & Sharon Lee Watson | April 18, 2006 | 1ALF07 | 15.62 | 10 |
| 8 | 8 | "SERE" | Steven DePaul | Lynn Mamet & Carol Flint | April 25, 2006 | 1ALF08 | 13.87 | 18 |
| 9 | 9 | "Eating the Young" | J. Miller Tobin | Sterling Anderson | May 2, 2006 | 1ALF05 | 14.06 | 18 |
| 10 | 10 | "Unannounced" | Bill L. Norton | Paul Redford & Emily Halpern | May 9, 2006 | 1ALF09 | 14.18 | 18 |
| 11 | 11 | "Exposure" | Guy Norman Bee | Sharon Lee Watson & Dan Hindmarch | May 9, 2006 | 1ALF10 | 12.33 | 26 |
| 12 | 12 | "Morale, Welfare and Recreation" | Félix Enríquez Alcalá | Sterling Anderson & Paul Redford | May 16, 2006 | 1ALF11 | 14.04 | 14 |
| 13 | 13 | "The Wall" | David Mamet | Eric L. Haney & Lynn Mamet | May 16, 2006 | 1ALF12 | 13.08 | 22 |

=== Season 2 (2006–07) ===
| No. overall | No. in season | Title | Directed by | Written by | Original release date | Prod. code | US viewers (millions) | Rank (week) |
|---|---|---|---|---|---|---|---|---|
| 14 | 1 | "Change of Station" | Steven DePaul | David Mamet | September 19, 2006 | 2ALF01 | 11.81 | 28 |
| 15 | 2 | "Extreme Rendition" | Terrence O'Hara | Sharon Lee Watson | September 26, 2006 | 2ALF03 | 11.96 | 27 |
| 16 | 3 | "The Kill Zone" | Steve Gomer | Lynn Mamet | October 3, 2006 | 2ALF02 | 13.22 | 23 |
| 17 | 4 | "Manhunt" | Michael Zinberg | Emily Halpern | October 10, 2006 | 2ALF04 | 13.03 | 23 |
| 18 | 5 | "Force Majeure" | James Whitmore, Jr. | Daniel Voll | October 17, 2006 | 2ALF05 | 12.94 | 25 |
| 19 | 6 | "Old Home Week" | David Mamet | David Mamet | October 31, 2006 | 2ALF07 | 11.49 | 30 |
| 20 | 7 | "Off the Meter" | Alex Zakrzewski | Lynn Mamet & Eric L. Haney | November 7, 2006 | 2ALF08 | 11.34 | 35 |
| 21 | 8 | "Natural Selection" | Helen Shaver | Sharon Lee Watson | November 14, 2006 | 2ALF09 | 11.84 | 30 |
| 22 | 9 | "Report by Exception" | Gwyneth Horder-Payton | Todd Ellis Kessler | November 21, 2006 (Note: "Report by Exception" was originally to be aired on October 24, 2006, but was preempted.) | 2ALF06 | 12.39 | 22 |
| 23 | 10 | "Bait" | Jean de Segonzac | Randy Huggins | November 28, 2006 | 2ALF10 | 12.56 | 23 |
| 24 | 11 | "Silver Star" | Bill L. Norton | David Mamet | December 12, 2006 | 2ALF14 | 13.74 | N/A |
| 25 | 12 | "The Broom Cupboard" | Karen Gaviola | Emily Halpern | January 16, 2007 | 2ALF11 | 11.93 | 19 |
| 26 | 13 | "Sub Conscious" | Steven DePaul | Daniel Voll | February 6, 2007 | 2ALF13 | 12.41 | 25 |
| 27 | 14 | "Johnny B. Good" | Vahan Moosekian | Todd Ellis Kessler | February 6, 2007 | 2ALF12 | 10.54 | 32 |
| 28 | 15 | "The Water is Wide" | Krishna Rao | Lynn Mamet | February 13, 2007 | 2ALF15 | 11.86 | 26 |
| 29 | 16 | "Games of Chance" | Terrence O'Hara | Sharon Lee Watson | February 20, 2007 | 2ALF16 | 11.70 | 23 |
| 30 | 17 | "Dark of the Moon" | Michael Zinberg | Eric L. Haney | February 27, 2007 | 2ALF17 | 13.05 | 21 |
| 31 | 18 | "Two Coins" | Bill L. Norton | David Mamet | March 20, 2007 | 2ALF18 | 11.97 | 17 |
| 32 | 19 | "Outsiders" | Alex Zakrzewski | Randy Huggins | April 3, 2007 | 2ALF19 | 9.83 | 33 |
| 33 | 20 | "In Loco Parentis" | Michael Offer | Clayton Surratt & Todd Ellis Kessler | April 10, 2007 | 2ALF20 | 10.37 | 24 |
| 34 | 21 | "Bedfellows" | Dean White | Emily Halpern | April 24, 2007 | 2ALF21 | 9.83 | 27 |
| 35 | 22 | "Freefall" | James Whitmore, Jr. | Daniel Voll & Sara B. Cooper | May 1, 2007 | 2ALF22 | 9.70 | 32 |
| 36 | 23 | "Paradise Lost" | Vahan Moosekian | Eric L. Haney & Lynn Mamet | May 8, 2007 | 2ALF23 | 10.74 | 24 |

=== Season 3 (2007) ===
| No. overall | No. in season | Title | Directed by | Written by | Original release date | Prod. code | US viewers (millions) | Rank (week) |
|---|---|---|---|---|---|---|---|---|
| 37 | 1 | "Pandemonium (Part 1)" | Vahan Moosekian | Sharon Lee Watson | September 25, 2007 | 3ALF01 | 10.70 | 30 |
| 38 | 2 | "Pandemonium (Part 2)" | Steven DePaul | Todd Ellis Kessler | October 2, 2007 | 3ALF02 | 11.31 | 24 |
| 39 | 3 | "Always Kiss Them Goodbye" | Michael Zinberg | Eric L. Haney | October 9, 2007 | 3ALF03 | 11.03 | 24 |
| 40 | 4 | "Every Step You Take" | Helen Shaver | Lynn Mamet | October 16, 2007 | 3ALF04 | 12.35 | 22 |
| 41 | 5 | "Inside Out" | Bill L. Norton | Dan Hindmarch | October 23, 2007 | 3ALF05 | 10.84 | 27 |
| 42 | 6 | "MPs" | James Whitmore, Jr. | David Mamet | October 30, 2007 | 3ALF06 | 10.72 | N/A |
| 43 | 7 | "Five Brothers" | Steve Gomer | Frank Military | November 6, 2007 | 3ALF07 | 11.08 | 27 |
| 44 | 8 | "Play 16" | James Whitmore, Jr. | Daniel Voll | November 13, 2007 | 3ALF08 | 11.04 | 27 |
| 45 | 9 | "Binary Explosion" | Steven DePaul | Randy Huggins | November 20, 2007 | 3ALF09 | 10.76 | 28 |
| 46 | 10 | "Gone Missing" | Terrence O'Hara | Eric L. Haney & Lynn Mamet | November 27, 2007 | 3ALF10 | 10.56 | 28 |
| 47 | 11 | "Side Angle Side" (Note: The title "Side Angle Side", commonly abbreviated in mathematics as SAS, refers to the British Special Air Service, also abbreviated SAS.) | Seth Wiley | Todd Ellis Kessler | December 18, 2007 | 3ALF11 | 10.74 | 10 |

=== Season 4 (2008–09) ===
| No. overall | No. in season | Title | Directed by | Written by | Original release date | Prod. code | US viewers (millions) | Rank (week) |
|---|---|---|---|---|---|---|---|---|
| 48 | 1 | "Sacrifice" | David Mamet | Frank Military | September 28, 2008 | 4ALF01 | 9.71 | 29 |
| 49 | 2 | "Sudden Flight" | Steven DePaul | Sharon Lee Watson | October 5, 2008 | 4ALF02 | 9.46 | 26 |
| 50 | 3 | "Sex Trade" | Jesús Salvador Treviño | Todd Ellis Kessler | October 12, 2008 | 4ALF03 | 9.10 | 29 |
| 51 | 4 | "The Conduit" | Michael Zinberg | David Mamet | October 19, 2008 | 4ALF04 | 8.28 | 36 |
| 52 | 5 | "Dancing Lessons" | Steve Gomer | Lynn Mamet & Ted Humphrey | October 26, 2008 | 4ALF05 | 9.17 | 36 |
| 53 | 6 | "Inquisition" | David Paymer | Patrick Moss & Shannon Rutherford | November 2, 2008 | 4ALF06 | 8.98 | 40 |
| 54 | 7 | "Into Hell (Part 1)" | Krishna Rao | Daniel Voll | November 9, 2008 | 4ALF07 | 9.87 | 27 |
| 55 | 8 | "Into Hell (Part 2)" | Fred Gerber | Frank Military | November 16, 2008 | 4ALF08 | 10.23 | 27 |
| 56 | 9 | "Shadow Riders" | Vahan Moosekian | Sharon Lee Watson | November 23, 2008 | 4ALF09 | 9.99 | 30 |
| 57 | 10 | "Misled and Misguided" | Steven DePaul | Todd Ellis Kessler | November 30, 2008 | 4ALF10 | 9.56 | 15 |
| 58 | 11 | "Switchblade" | Oz Scott | David Mamet | December 21, 2008 | 4ALF11 | 8.24 | 19 |
| 59 | 12 | "Bad Beat" | Bill L. Norton | Ted Humphrey | January 4, 2009 | 4ALF12 | 9.73 | 9 |
| 60 | 13 | "The Spear of Destiny" | Scott Foley | Lynn Mamet & Benjamin Daniel Lobato | January 11, 2009 | 4ALF13 | 10.16 | 24 |
| 61 | 14 | "The Last Nazi" | Michael Offer | David Mamet | February 15, 2009 | 4ALF14 | 8.36 | 18 |
| 62 | 15 | "Hero" | Terrence O'Hara | R. Scott Gemmill & Randy Huggins | March 8, 2009 | 4ALF15 | 9.38 | 33 |
| 63 | 16 | "Hill 60" | James Whitmore, Jr. | Ted Humphrey | March 15, 2009 | 4ALF16 | 10.87 | 21 |
| 64 | 17 | "Flesh & Blood" | Dennis Haysbert | Lynn Mamet & Pete Blaber | March 22, 2009 | 4ALF17 | 8.14 | 35 |
| 65 | 18 | "Best Laid Plans" | Dean White | Benjamin Daniel Lobato & Patrick Moss | March 29, 2009 | 4ALF18 | 9.46 | 14 |
| 66 | 19 | "Whiplash" | Seth Wiley | Dan Hindmarch | April 12, 2009 | 4ALF19 | 9.05 | 28 |
| 67 | 20 | "Chaos Theory" | Gwyneth Horder-Payton | Sharon Lee Watson | April 26, 2009 | 4ALF20 | 8.84 | 14 |
| 68 | 21 | "End Game" | Lesli Linka Glatter | Ted Humphrey | May 3, 2009 | 4ALF21 | 9.97 | 15 |
| 69 | 22 | "Unknown Soldier" | Vahan Moosekian | Todd Ellis Kessler | May 10, 2009 | 4ALF22 | 9.64 | 14 |
