= Todd Kessler (disambiguation) =

Todd Kessler is an American film and television writer, producer and director.

Todd Kessler may also refer to:

- Todd A. Kessler, head writer and co-creator of the TV series Damages
- Todd Ellis Kessler, American television producer and writer
- Todd Kessler, contestant on the third season of the U.S. version of The Voice
