= The Unit =

2006 American action-drama television series

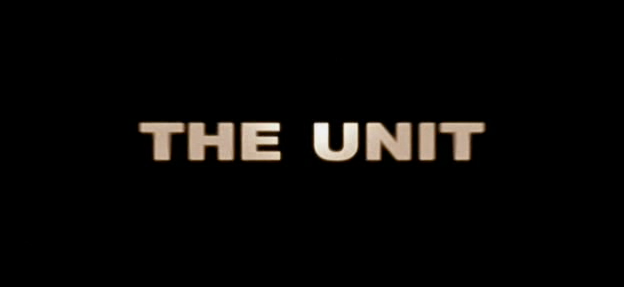
- Genre: Action; Drama
- Created by: David Mamet
- Based on: Inside Delta Force: The Story of America's Elite Counterterrorist Unit by Eric L. Haney
- Starring: Dennis Haysbert; Regina Taylor; Scott Foley; Robert Patrick; Audrey Marie Anderson; Max Martini; Abby Brammell; Demore Barnes; Michael Irby; Nicole Steinwedell
- Theme music composer: Robert Duncan
- Opening theme: "Fired Up" (Seasons 1–2); "Walk the Fire" (Seasons 3–4)
- Country of origin: United States
- Original language: English
- No. of seasons: 4
- No. of episodes: 69 (list of episodes)

Production
- Executive producers: David Mamet; Shawn Ryan; Vahan Moosekian; Todd Ellis Kessler; Daniel Voll; Carol Flint
- Producers: Sharon Lee Watson; Eric L. Haney; Norman S. Powell; Dennis Haysbert
- Cinematography: Krishna Rao; Michael Stecher; Checco Varese; Giovanni Lampassi
- Editors: Rick Tuber; Devon Greene; David Koeppel; David Kaldor; Farrel Levy; Erik Presant; Ian Harbilas
- Running time: 42 minutes
- Production companies: David Mamet Chicago (season 1); Bay Kinescope Boston (seasons 2–4); MiddKid Productions; 20th Century Fox Television

Original release
- Network: CBS
- Release: March 7, 2006 – May 10, 2009

The Unit is an American action-drama television series created by David Mamet that aired on CBS from March 7, 2006, to May 10, 2009, with the total of four seasons and 69 episodes. The series focuses on a top-secret military unit modeled after the real-life U.S. Army special operations unit commonly known as Delta Force. It starred Dennis Haysbert, Regina Taylor, Scott Foley, Audrey Marie Anderson, Max Martini, Abby Brammell, Demore Barnes, Michael Irby, and Nicole Steinwedell.

At the time of its original broadcast, The Unit was one of CBS' most successful series, earning high television ratings and was nominated for a Primetime Emmy Award. On May 19, 2009, CBS cancelled the series after four seasons.

== Premise ==
Based on show producer Eric L. Haney's book Inside Delta Force: The Story of America's Elite Counterterrorist Unit, The Unit was created for television and executive produced by David Mamet and Shawn Ryan. The show is produced by The Barn Productions Inc., David Mamet Entertainment, and Fire Ants Films in association with 20th Century Fox Television.

The show purports to describe the daily lives of Delta Force (called "The Unit" in the show) operators during training and operational missions, as well as their families back home.

Internationally, The Unit premiered on October 3, 2006, in the United Kingdom on Bravo; on October 11, 2006, in Australia on the Seven Network, and on FOX8 and Arena on Foxtel/Austar pay-TV network and now airs on 7Two on Tuesdays at 8:30 pm; on January 11 in Spain on La Sexta; on January 25 in the Netherlands on RTL 5; on March 7 in Germany on Sat. 1; on September 23 in Bulgaria on bTV; on March 9, 2008, in Russia on DTV; and on June 13, 2009, in Vietnam on VTC7-Today TV, in Sri Lanka by Hiru TV in 2012, in Turkey by TNT, and in Indonesia on Global TV.

The theme music for the first and second seasons was "Fired Up" by Robert Duncan. Although the show focuses on an Army special ops unit, "Fired Up" is an adaptation of a Marine Corps running cadence called "Fired Up, Feels Good". Duncan also created "Walk the Fire", a 22-second segment used as a theme in seasons three and four.

== Summary ==
In the U.S. Army, Delta Force is colloquially known as "The Unit". Its recruits are selected from the Army (primarily from the 75th Ranger Regiment and Special Forces Groups). The few who pass selection then undergo several more years of sophisticated and rigorous training for counterterrorism, reconnaissance, and direct-action missions. In a television interview, series creator Eric Haney—who is a former Delta Force operator—stated that the term "Delta Force" is never used in the spec ops community. They are only referred to as "The Unit" and their DOD designation is "Combat Applications Group". The official cover name of the unit in the show is the "303rd Logistical Studies Group". In the third season's premiere, an onscreen read-out identifies the Unit as "1st Special Actions Group".

The Unit is based at a fictional army post, "Fort Griffith". The location of Fort Griffith is never explicitly stated, but in episode 103, a bank statement of the lead character clearly shows an address for Fort Griffith, MO 63021, which puts it a few miles west of St. Louis. Other episodes make clear references to Greenwood, including mentions of Greenwood/Fort Griffith area, and local Greenwood police cars, as well as Missouri license plates clearly appear in many episodes. Greenwood, Missouri, is a small town located southeast of Kansas City. However, the red, white, and blue license plate is from the state of Idaho. This license plate can be seen in almost all the episodes. Unit members also wear the shoulder sleeve insignia of the inactivated 24th Infantry Division on their class A uniforms, as well as the shoulder crest of the 504th Parachute Infantry Regiment, "Strike Hold", currently part of the 1st BCT of the 82nd Airborne Division. In later episodes, unit members are shown as wearing the Special Operations Command patch on their class A uniforms.

The unit's immediate chain of command goes to the commanding officer, Colonel Tom Ryan—and, presumably, straight to the President of the United States. It is unknown whether or not this bypasses the command hierarchy, though in the season-four episode, "The Spear of Destiny", a side character receives confidential mission information and when questioned as to who sent her, replies, "the Secretary of Defense". However, in the episode, "The Broom Cupboard", the President gives orders directly to Jonas for a unit mission.

The wives of the unit's Alpha Team personnel are given minimal mission or operational information. They are responsible for maintaining the "303rd Logistical Studies Group" cover in all interactions with anyone who is not a unit family member. Their husbands are, in fact, still performing highly dangerous missions, but they are not permitted to know specifics, such as where their husbands are deployed, of what their training routines consist, how long their assignments will last, or even if their husbands are safe.

If a member of the unit is killed in action, the actual mode of death is not told to the families. A cover story concurrent with a member of the 303 Logistical Studies Unit is created. The wives themselves are encouraged to form a close, cohesive military family based on the common knowledge and strife to which this inevitably leads.

The unit has an unconventional structure. With the size of a company—about 130 operators—it is commanded by a colonel (companies are usually commanded by captains; colonels usually command elements such as brigades or regiments). This is parallel to Delta's structure, which was implemented by Col. Charles Alvin Beckwith. The CO, Colonel Ryan, normally wears a "sanitized" uniform (bearing absolutely no tapes, such as his name, or even U.S. Army, or rank insignia).

Whereas a Special Forces Operational Detachment–Alpha (ODA) is commanded by a captain, the unit sends five-man teams into the field under noncommissioned officers, such as the team led by Sergeant Major Jonas Blane, the Unit's NCOIC of Alpha Team. Their soldiers possibly have the same Special Forces specialties as in Army Special Forces. An ODA, formerly known as an "A-Team", has weapons sergeants, engineering sergeants, medical sergeants, communications sergeants, etc.

The wives, if suspected of speaking about the unit's existence, can cause their husbands to be expelled and returned to regular Army service. Colonel Ryan states repeatedly that this can ruin a soldier's career, as well as his marriage, and has also stated that he will not hesitate to destroy families to preserve the unit's security. He has also threatened the wives with closing the unit down, and restarting it somewhere else under another cover—forcing the uprooting of all families involved.

The unit deploys throughout the world, and both the Army and United States government have the ability to deny the existence of the unit and any of its members to prevent the onset of international incidents. Their uniforms are commonly not standard Army issue, which makes denying their connection with the US Army easier if they are killed or captured. They also carry weapons that are not always standard issue, and the unit's personnel are familiar with weapons from around the world and can make themselves look like military personnel from other organizations. Unit members can and are sometimes also working as protection details for U.S. diplomats on visits overseas, as well as foreign dignitaries and State Department-designated VIPs on U.S. soil, in which cases they are attached to the Diplomatic Security Service and do carry the official DSS Special Agent badge.

The unit's members frequently use code names when operational such as Snake Doctor (Blane), Dirt Diver (Gerhardt), Betty Blue (Grey), Cool Breeze (Brown), and Hammer Head (Williams), as well as colors: Mr. White, Green, Blue, and Black. These are usually used when working directly with American civilians, other English speakers not trained for emergencies, or on counterterrorism missions. According to Jonas Blane, the order of precedence for his team after he is disabled, is, from top to bottom: Mack Gerhardt, Charles Grey, Hector Williams, and Bob Brown based on seniority.

Several episodes are based on real events to varying degrees. Season 2, Episode 23 is about an investigation of illegal activity by The Unit, whose primary purpose is to perform actions that would otherwise be illegal in the countries they operate in. The real life analog is the investigation into SEAL Team 6's founding commander, Richard Marcinko, who was ultimately prosecuted for $50,000 in purportedly embezzled cash, while his team regularly handled millions of dollars in unmarked bills.

== Episodes ==
Season	Episodes	Originally released	
Season	Episodes	First released	Last released
1	13	March 7, 2006	May 16, 2006
2	23	September 19, 2006	May 8, 2007
3	11	September 25, 2007	December 18, 2007
4	22	September 28, 2008	May 10, 2009

== Cast ==
Actor	Role	Callsign	Seasons as main cast	Seasons as supporting	Seasons as recurring / guest
Dennis Haysbert	Sergeant Major^{**} Jonas Blane	Snake Doctor	1–4		
Regina Taylor	Molly Blane		1	2–4	
Scott Foley	Sergeant First Class^{**} Bob Brown	Moreno / Whippoorwill / Cool Breeze	1–4		
Audrey Marie Anderson	Kim Brown		1	2–4	
Max Martini	Master Sergeant^{**} Mack Gerhardt	Dirt Diver	1–4		
Abby Brammell	Tiffy Gerhardt		1	2–4	
Michael Irby	Sergeant First Class Charles Grey	Betty Blue	1–4		
Bre Blair	Joss Grey^{*}			4	
Robert Patrick	Brigadier General^{**} Thomas Ryan	Dog Patch 06 / Blue Iguana	1–4		
Rebecca Pidgeon	Charlotte Ryan^{*}			2–4	
Demore Barnes	Sergeant First Class Hector Williams	Hammer Head	1–3		
Nicole Steinwedell	Warrant Officer One Bridget Sullivan	Red Cap	4		
Wes Chatham	Staff Sergeant Sam McBride	Whiplash		4	
Kavita Patil	Sergeant Kayla Medawar			2–4	1
Angel Wainwright	Second Lieutenant Betsy Blane				2–4
Alyssa Shafer	Serena Brown				1–4
Anthony Brandon Wong	Prince Sakda				2

=== Notes ===
^**Continuity errors frequently occur regarding the rank of Jonas Blane. In "Pandemonium, Part 2", Blane states his rank as command sergeant major, his uniform rank is sergeant major. In the United States Army, however, soldiers are often laterally transitioned between the ranks depending on their assignments. Command sergeants major are also addressed as "sergeant major" when in conversation, not "command sergeant major". This is similar to the practice (in the Army) whereby staff sergeants or sergeants first class are addressed simply as "sergeant".

^**Promoted from staff sergeant during "Side Angle Side".

^**Although this might have just been dirty talk, a similar continuity error exists regarding the rank of Mack Gerhardt. In the season-one episode "True Believers", his wife says to him "come here sergeant major, and give me a report", but his rank is later established as master sergeant. In the final wedding scene of season four, however, Mack is shown with E-7, or sergeant first class, rank on his uniform.

^**Promoted from colonel during "Unknown Soldier"

^*Formerly Morgan; married Grey in "Unknown Soldier"

^*Formerly Canning; married Ryan in "The Wall"

== Production ==
In 2005, CBS ordered a pilot for an adaptation of Eric L. Haney's 2002 memoir Inside Delta Force: The Story of America's Elite Counterterrorist Unit. It premiered in the United States on March 7, 2006, on CBS as a midseason replacement. The second season debuted on September 19, 2006.

The third season started on September 25, 2007, with a hiatus occurring after the 11th episode due to 2007–08 Writers Guild of America strike. The show was picked up for a fourth and final season by CBS on May 12, 2008.

The fourth and final season began on September 28, 2008, and concluded on May 10, 2009. On May 19, 2009, it was announced that, after four seasons and 69 episodes, the series had been cancelled by CBS, but on the same day, producers at 20th Century Fox Television announced that the reruns of the show would be broadcast in syndication, in stations covering 56% of the country already committed to carrying the show, including the Fox Television Stations.

== Main crew ==
Series directed by:

- Steven DePaul (7 episodes, 2006–2008)
- Bill L. Norton (5 episodes, 2006–2009)
- James Whitmore Jr. (5 episodes, 2006–2009)
- Vahan Moosekian (5 episodes, 2007–2009)
- Terrence O'Hara (4 episodes, 2006–2009)
- Steve Gomer (4 episodes, 2006–2008)
- David Mamet (4 episodes, 2006–2008)
- Michael Zinberg (4 episodes, 2006–2008)
- Helen Shaver (3 episodes, 2006–2007)
- Gwyneth Horder-Payton (2 episodes, 2006–2009)
- Oz Scott (2 episodes, 2006–2008)
- Alex Zakrzewski (2 episodes, 2006–2007)
- Davis Guggenheim (2 episodes, 2006)
- Michael Offer (2 episodes, 2007–2009)
- Dean White (2 episodes, 2007–2009)
- Seth Wiley (2 episodes, 2007–2009)
- Krishna Rao (2 episodes, 2007–2008)

Series writing credits:

- David Mamet (67 episodes, 2006–2009)
- Eric L. Haney (66 episodes, 2006–2009)
- Randy Huggins (25 episodes, 2006–2009)
- Emily Halpern (24 episodes, 2006–2007)
- Lynn Mamet (12 episodes, 2006–2009)
- Sterling Anderson (12 episodes, 2006)
- Sharon Lee Watson (10 episodes, 2006–2009)
- Todd Ellis Kessler (8 episodes, 2006–2009)
- Daniel Voll (5 episodes, 2006–2008)
- Paul Redford (4 episodes, 2006)
- Ted Humphrey (4 episodes, 2008–2009)
- Dan Hindmarch (3 episodes, 2006–2009)
- Frank Military (3 episodes, 2007–2008)
- Shawn Ryan (2 episodes, 2006–2007)
- Carol Flint (2 episodes, 2006)
- Peter Blaber (2 episodes, 2008–2009)
- Patrick Moss (2 episodes, 2008–2009)
- Benjamin Daniel Lobato (2 episodes, 2009)

== Reception ==
=== Seasonal ratings ===
Season		Episodes	Originally aired			Viewers (millions)	Rank
Season		Episodes	Season premiere	Season finale	Time slot (ET)	Viewers (millions)	Rank
1	2005–06	13	March 7, 2006	May 16, 2006	Tuesday at 9:00 pm	15.5	14
2	2006–07	23	September 19, 2006	May 8, 2007	Tuesday at 9:00 pm	11.1	36
3	2007–08	11	September 25, 2007	December 18, 2007	Tuesday at 9:00 pm	10.7	37
4	2008–09	22	September 28, 2008	May 10, 2009	Sunday at 10:00 pm	10.0	43

DVR Ratings:

- season 4 (9/22/08 – 11/23/08): 1.37 million

== Awards and nominations ==
Year	Award	Category	Work	Outcome
2006	Primetime Emmy Awards	Outstanding Stunt Coordination	Norman Howell (stunt coordinator); For episode "First Responders".	Nominated
2006	Casting Society of America, USA Artios	Best Dramatic Pilot Casting	Sharon Bialy, and Sherry Thomas; For episode "First Responders (#1.1)".	Nominated
2007	Screen Actors Guild Awards	Outstanding Performance by a Stunt Ensemble in a Television Series	Kanin Howell (stunts)	Nominated
2007	ASCAP Film and Television Music Awards 2007	Top TV Series	Robert Duncan	Won
2007	Hollywood Post Alliance, US 2007	Outstanding Compositing – Television	Bob Minshall, Matt von Brock, Changsoo Eun, Dan Lopez, and Encore; For Episode: "Johnny B. Good"	Nominated
2007	Young Artist Awards 2007	Best Performance in a TV Series (Comedy or Drama) – Guest Starring Young Actor	Alec Holden	Nominated
2007	Image Awards 2007	Outstanding Drama Series		Nominated
2007	Image Awards 2007	Outstanding Actor in a Drama Series	Dennis Haysbert	Nominated
2007	Image Awards 2007	Outstanding Actress in a Drama Series	Regina Taylor	Nominated
2008	Image Awards 2008	Outstanding Actress in a Drama Series	Regina Taylor	Won
2008	Image Awards 2008	Outstanding Drama Series		Nominated
2008	Image Awards 2008	Outstanding Actor in a Drama Series	Dennis Haysbert	Nominated
2008	Screen Actors Guild Awards 2008	Outstanding Performance by a Stunt Ensemble in a Television Series	Troy Brown, Max Daniels, Steve M. Davison, Jeffrey J. Dashnaw, and Daniel Hernandez	Nominated
2008	Young Artist Awards 2008	Best Performance in a TV Series – Recurring Young Actress	Danielle Hanratty	Nominated
2009	Screen Actors Guild Awards 2009	Outstanding Performance by a Stunt Ensemble in a Television Series	Troy Brown, J.J. Dashnaw, Eddie J. Fernandez, and Oakley Lehman	Nominated
2009	Image Awards 2009	Outstanding Drama Series		Nominated
2009	Image Awards 2009	Outstanding Actor in a Drama Series	Dennis Haysbert	Nominated
2009	Young Artist Awards 2009	Best Performance in a TV Series – Recurring Young Actress	Danielle Hanratty	Nominated
2010	Screen Actors Guild Awards 2010	Outstanding Performance by a Stunt Ensemble in a Television Series	Troy Brown, Max Daniels, J.J. Dashnaw, and Oakley Lehman	Nominated

== Home media ==
DVD name	Region 1	Region 2	Region 3	Region 4
The Complete First Season	September 19, 2006	April 30, 2007 France: July 4, 2007; Belgium: August 8, 2007	April 18, 2007	April 18, 2007
The Complete Second Season	September 25, 2007	October 22, 2007	TBA	March 4, 2008
The Complete Third Season	October 14, 2008	October 20, 2008	TBA	April 8, 2009
The Complete Fourth Season	September 29, 2009	February 22, 2010	TBA	May 5, 2010
The Unit: The Complete Giftset	September 29, 2009	February 22, 2010	TBA	May 5, 2010
The Unit: The Complete Series	TBA	TBA	TBA	2012 (Single Case) 2015 (Repackaged)

Two novelizations of CBS's The Unit were written by Patrick Andrews and published by Signet Books. Both novels feature the main characters. "The Unit: Seek and Destroy" was published in 2008 and "The Unit: Lock and Load" was published in 2009. Their plots feature missions of The Unit not shown in the CBS series.

== Prospective fifth season storyline ==
According to an interview executive producer Shawn Ryan gave to The Futon Critic, "[David] Mamet and I and our writers, we came up with a lot of great stuff," Ryan said about his pitch to CBS executives for a potential fifth season. "It was going to be a whole new show in the sense that we were going to be training some young people, Bob was going to be training some people for a whole new organization. Jonas was finally going to be seeing his run end.... The final season was going to be, I figured the fifth season was going to be the last... It was going to be a long, sort of final mission for Jonas. He's not medically cleared, Mack has to go in and sort of change the medical records so that Jonas can keep on [going on missions]. We had a whole thing planned, it was going to be good." Jonas would eventually leave the Army due to his injuries coupled with combat stress and reunite with Molly. Mack would take over the team but at the end of the series would also leave for a training post after Tiffy becomes pregnant with their third child. Bob would be badly injured in a parachuting accident and join the CIA as their Unit liaison. Ryan would take a demotion to regain control of The Unit whilst Bridget Sullivan would be killed on a mission halfway through the season. Charles Grey would take over as team leader with Sam McBride as his deputy training replacements for the personnel they have lost.

Other storylines would include the recruitment of more female members, the team being hounded by human rights campaigners intent on bringing them to trial for their actions, the CIA creating its own rival commando force as a mirror image of The Unit, the search for a mole within the organization leaking information to the highest bidder, the Army's treatment of soldiers suffering debilitating injuries and combat stress and Sam McBride confiding to Bridget Sullivan that he is the Unit's first gay member.

== See also ==
- Ultimate Force – Similarly-theme series focused on the British Army's Special Air Service.
- Six - Similarly-themed series focused on the United States Navy's Naval Special Warfare Development Group, also known as SEAL Team Six.
- SEAL Team – Similarly-themed series also focused on the Naval Special Warfare Development Group.
