= Paul R. Howe =

Retired US Army Delta Force member (born 1959)

Master sergeant Paul Randal Howe
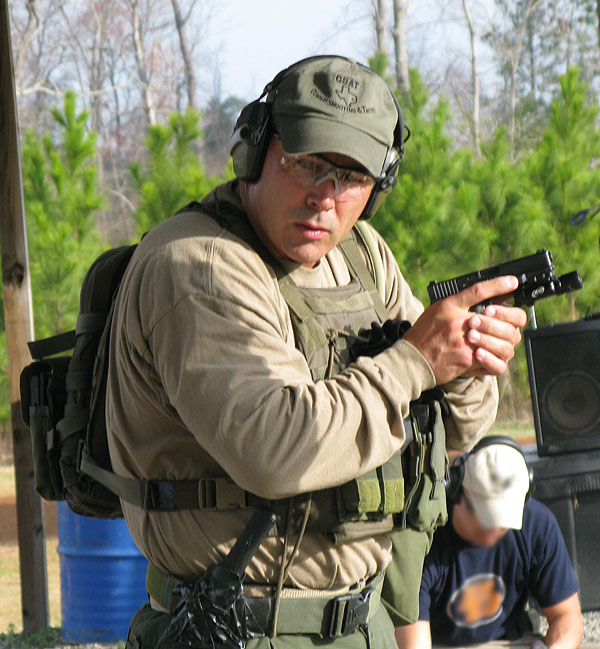
- Howe in 2009
- Born: 1959 (age 66–67)
- Spouse: Constance Beckwith
- Children: 3
- Relatives: Charles Alvin Beckwith (father-in-law)
- Military career
- Allegiance: United States
- Branch: Joint Special Operations Command; United States Army; Infantry Branch (United States)
- Service years: 1980–2000
- Rank: Master sergeant
- Unit: 1st Special Forces Operational Detachment–Delta (Delta Force)
- Conflicts: Battle of Mogadishu (1993); Persian Gulf War; Operation Just Cause
- Other work: Founder, CEO, and lead instructor of CSAT Company (2000–present)
- Website: CSAT

Paul Randal Howe (born 1959) is an American former Delta Force operator. He participated in the special operations rescue at the Battle of Mogadishu (1993) which led to the book Black Hawk Down: A Story of Modern War and the Black Hawk Down film. He is a firearms instructor and counterterrorism expert who trains people in high-risk operations. His company is called CSAT-Combat Shooting and Tactics. He is the author of three books about leadership.

== Military career ==
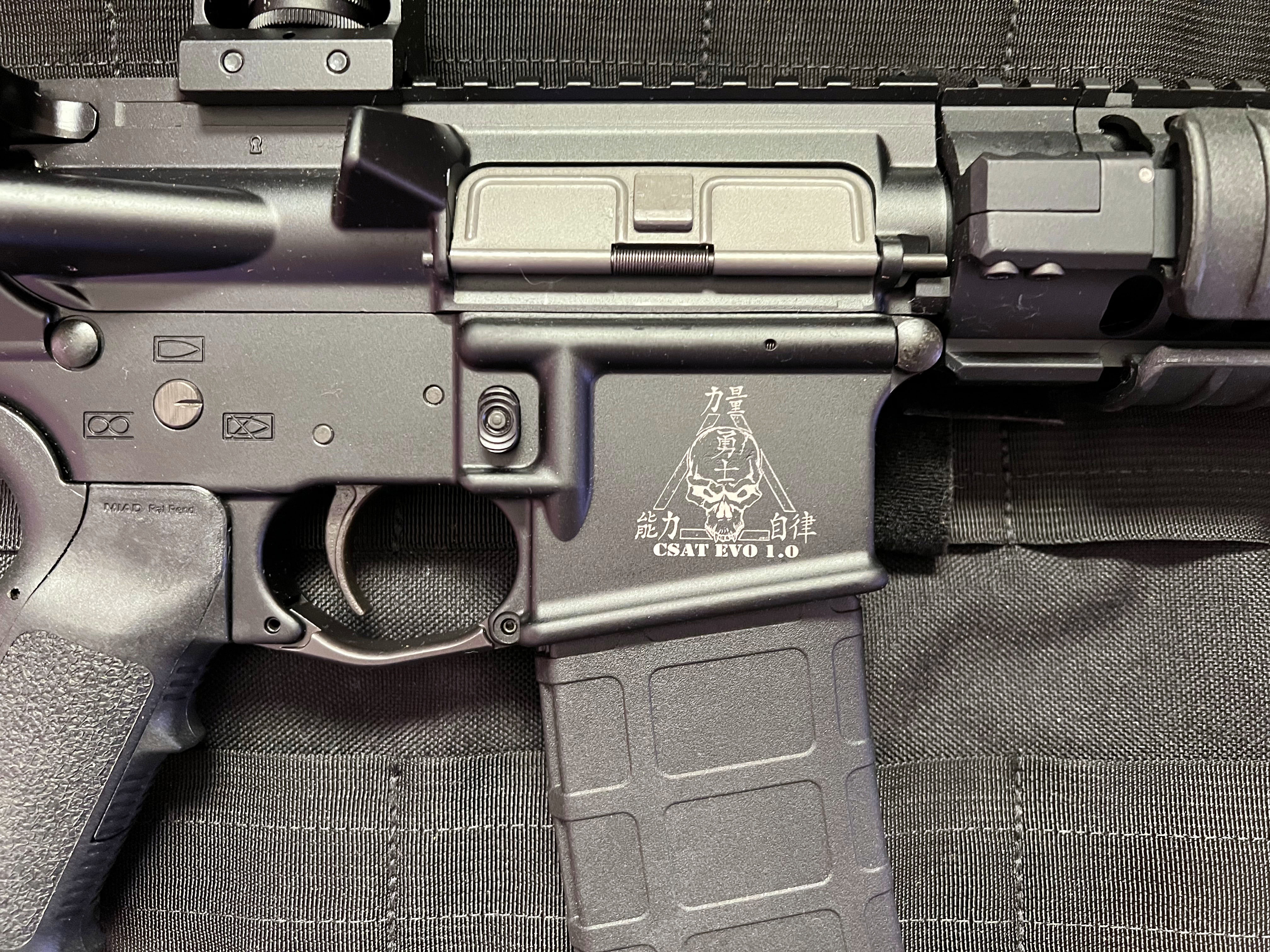
Paul Howe Signature edition LWRCI CSAT M6 A1 EVO 1.0 rifle

Howe served 20 years in the U.S. Army. He held the rank of Master Sergeant and was a member of Delta Force. For ten of those years he was involved in special operations. He fought in the 1993 Battle of Mogadishu.

His experiences in Mogadishu were portrayed in the film Black Hawk Down. Howe provided much of the information about Delta Force operations for the writing of the 1999 book: Black Hawk Down: A Story of Modern War. He was the leader of the assault team that went in to rescue Army Rangers and Delta Force members in Mogadishu. Mark Bowden met with Howe in 1997 about writing the book after clearing it with Howe's commanding officer. Howe was first to arrive on the scene of the downed Black Hawk helicopter. Other Delta Force members were also consulted for the book, but they did not allow the use of their real names. Howe has faced some criticism for allowing Bowden to use his real name.

== Career ==
In 2000 Howe graduated with an MIS (Masters of Interdisciplinary Studies) from Stephen F. Austin State University. After his 20-year military career Howe became an instructor specializing in high-risk training for law enforcement. He works as a professional instructor and runs Combat Shooting & Tactics (CSAT) which is a training facility in Nacogdoches, Texas. He started the company in 2000.

When the September 11 attacks occurred in 2001 there was a demand for counterterrorism instruction. Howe served as an instructor for a counterterrorism company: The HALO Corporation International. The company employed former military special forces members as instructors. Howe taught hostage rescue and firearms training. Howe also focuses on hostage rescue when training law enforcement and SWAT teams.

== Personal life ==
Howe is married to Constance "Connie" (née Beckwith), a former Army Reserve major and the daughter of Delta Force founder, Col. Charles Alvin Beckwith. His daughter, U.S. Air Force Technical Sergeant Mary Howe (Now Daniell), is an aerial gunner with the 4th Special Operations Squadron. He lives and works in Nacogdoches, Texas.

== Paul Howe signature firearms ==
- LWRC International M6A1-S 5.56 CSAT EVO 1.0 Paul Howe Limited Edition
- Wilson Combat Paul Howe G19
- Wilson Combat The Paul Howe Tactical Carbine

== Books ==
- Howe, Paul R. (2011). Leadership and Training for the Fight [A Few Thoughts on Leadership and Training from a Former Special Operations Soldier]. New York: Skyhorse Publishing. ISBN 978-1-61608-304-5.
- Howe, Paul R. (2005). Leadership and Training for the Fight [Using Special Operations Principals to Succeed in Law Enforcement, Business and War]. New York: Skyhorse Publishing. ISBN 9781420889505.
- Howe, Paul R. (2009). The Tactical Trainer (Training for the Fight) [A Few Thoughts on Training and Training Management from a Former Special Operations Soldier]. Bloomington, IN: AuthorHouse. ISBN 978-1438996288.

== Popular culture ==
Actor William Fichtner played as SFC Jeff Sanderson in the 2001 film Black Hawk Down. Jeff Sanderson was based on Paul R. Howe.
