= Aviation Technology Office =

- Active: Mar. 2, 1981 (as SEASPRAY) – present
- Country: United States
- Branch: United States Army
- Type: Aviation
- Role: Clandestine special operations
- Part of: U.S. Army Aviation Flight Test Directorate
- Garrison/HQ: Felker Army Airfield, Fort Eustis, Virginia, United States

Aircraft flown
- Helicopter: Mil Mi-17, Bell 407, Bell 429, Beechcraft King Air, MD Helicopters MD 500

The Aviation Technology Office (ATO), known as Flight Concepts Division (FCD) before 2017, is a component of the United States Army that provides discreet, sometimes clandestine helicopter aviation support primarily to Joint Special Operations Command (JSOC). Originally known as SEASPRAY, it was a joint U.S. Army special operations and CIA clandestine aviation unit established in 1981, and later integrated as the covered air component (E Squadron) of Delta Force.

The unit provides highly specialized flights for special operations forces during covert and clandestine missions, and also has a bleeding-edge development role, leading research in emerging technologies for Army aviation. Officially part of the U.S. Army Aviation Flight Test Directorate, the unit is located at Felker Army Airfield along the James River on Fort Eustis, and has been described as "the best of the very best" and "one of the most secretive U.S. military aviation units known to be in existence today".

External images
- Modified Bell 407s attributed to ATO depart in formation Note the military communications arrays equipped on each.

== History ==
Through its various incarnations, the unit's history has been described as "intertwined" with many other covert elements of the U.S. Army including the Intelligence Support Activity, as far back as the 1980s. The U.S. Army established SEASPRAY on March 2, 1981, in conjunction with the CIA, to perform the Army's fixed-wing and rotary "covered air" mission, which involved moving personnel and materiel under civilian cover. SEASPRAY, operating under the cover name "1st Rotary Wing Test Activity", originally served as the covered air counterpart to the Army's non-covered Task Force 158, which would later evolve into the 160th Special Operations Aviation Regiment. Unlike TF 158, which served a purely military role, Seaspray was able to move CIA personnel as well as military.

The company-sized unit was initially equipped with unmarked Hughes 500D helicopters which were modified for their role, and was based at Fort Eustis in Virginia. The unit later also acquired nine Cessna and Beechcraft King Air fixed-wing aircraft. In line with typical CIA practices, these helicopters and aircraft were not included in the official register of U.S. Army aircraft and were instead registered as belonging to a company called Aviation Tech Services. In addition to allowing the unit to operate under civilian cover, the structuring allowed for a limitation of liability against SEASPRAY.

SEASPRAY established a base at Tampa, Florida to support its operations in Central America. SEASPRAY has also been reported to have assisted the CIA to "obtain, exploit and spoof foreign aircraft and technology". The existence of SEASPRAY did not become publicly known until 1985. Though not initially under the control of Joint Special Operations Command, Michael Smith's 2011 book Killer Elite states that SEASPRAY was placed under the control of the Intelligence Support Activity (ISA) at an unspecified date and was used to covertly transport ISA, CIA, Delta Force and SEAL Team Six personnel; by 1989 it had become absorbed into Delta Force, becoming the unit's "E Squadron".

In the 1990s, E Squadron was known to the wider military under its cover name, "Flight Concepts Division". It also had several cover and code names including "Latent Arrow". By 2017, the organization's cover identity had been renamed to the Aviation Technology Office.

== Activities ==
The activities of the ATO and its predecessor entities are highly classified; with little public information. In April 1981 a SEASPRAY helicopter flew Lebanese Christian leader Bachir Gemayel from Cairo to Lebanon as the first stage of a trip to the United States. From 1982 until 1985 SEASPRAY fixed-wing aircraft conducted signals intelligence sorties over Honduras. In the early 1980s the Army rejected a proposal from the CIA that SEASPRAY aircraft be used to follow small aircraft which were potentially being used to smuggle weapons from Nicaragua to El Salvador. The CIA conducted this operation using civilian aircrews instead.

Flight Concepts Division was believed to have provided two modified Little Bird helicopters during the Battle of Mogadishu. The unit also reportedly led the development of the stealth variant of the Sikorsky UH-60 Blackhawk helicopter used in the raid on Osama Bin Laden's compound in Abbottabad, Pakistan.

In December 2001, Russian authorities arrested a group of contractors reportedly working for the Flight Concepts Division in the city of Petropavlovsk, where they were allegedly trying to surreptitiously buy Mi-17 transport helicopters for operations in Afghanistan.

== Aircraft ==
Aircraft reportedly flown by the unit by country of origin:

- Russia
  - Mil Mi-17
- United States
  - Bell 407
- United States
  - Beechcraft King Air
- United States
  - MD Helicopters MD 500

== See also ==
- Scott A. Howell
