= Inside Delta Force =

2002 memoir by Eric L. Haney

- Author: Eric L. Haney
- Language: English
- Genre: Memoir
- Publisher: Delacorte Press
- Publication date: May 14, 2002
- Publication place: United States
- Media type: Print (hardcover & paperback)
- Pages: 336 pp (first edition, hardcover)
- ISBN: 978-0-385-33603-1 (first edition, hardcover)
- OCLC: 48649106
- Dewey Decimal: 356/.167/0973 21
- LC Class: UA34.S64 H36 2002

Inside Delta Force: The Story of America's Elite Counterterrorist Unit is a 2002 memoir written by Eric L. Haney about his experiences as a founding special forces operator in the 1st Special Forces Operational Detachment–Delta (also known as Delta Force) the U.S. Army's counterterrorist unit. Haney recounts the formation and early operations of the unit, as well as his own recruitment, selection and training. Haney also evaluates the impact of inter-service rivalries and potential overlap created when Delta Force was formed, including the challenges of dealing with the Central Intelligence Agency. Central to the book is Haney's participation in Delta Force's first operation – the aborted 1980 Operation Eagle Claw to Iran to free American hostages.

Inside Delta Force formed the inspiration for the CBS television series The Unit, in which Haney was involved as a writer, producer, and technical advisor.

== Criticism ==
Since the publication of Inside Delta Force in 2002 and Haney's subsequent success with The Unit television show, three of his former Delta colleagues accused him of embellishing his accomplishments within the unit and fabricating several of the events depicted. Some of the criticism directed at Haney has focused on his stating that he was a "founding member" of Delta Force. Former operators acknowledge only one "founder," Colonel Charlie Beckwith, who helped establish the unit and was its first commanding officer. Haney used the term "founding member" to indicate that he was among the first operators assigned to the 1SFOD-D.

One operator, Logan Fitch, who first wrote publicly of the Eagle Claw mission for Penthouse Magazine in 1984 and was highly critical of Beckwith, called Haney a "crass opportunist" for capitalizing on his past service for personal gain. Despite the falling-out between Haney and some former Delta members, Haney stands behind the accuracy of his book.

Another original member criticized Haney for revealing too much about Delta Force's training, tactics and early missions. A U.S. Army historian has questioned if this is really the case, as the information in Haney's book was current in the late 1970s and early 1980s, and Delta Force has surely changed its procedures since then. Moreover, operational information by Delta veterans had been made public before, including in Black Hawk Down, Mark Bowden's book about the Battle of Mogadishu, in which Delta operators participated, and most notably in Beckwith's own book on the formation and training of the unit.

== Reviews ==
- Dilley, Michael F. (Summer 2002). "Michael F. Dilley, Infantry Magazine, Summer 2002". Infantry Magazine. 91 (2). Archived from the original on December 10, 2007 – via FindArticles.
- Col. J. H. Crerar, Army Historical Foundation
