= Eric L. Haney =

Retired United States Army soldier (born 1952)

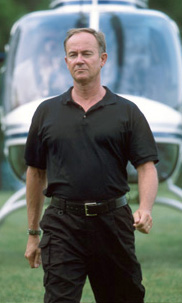
- Haney in 2003
- Born: August 22, 1952 (age 74); Lindale, Georgia, U.S.
- Military career
- Allegiance: United States of America
- Branch: United States Army
- Service years: 1970–1990
- Rank: Command Sergeant Major
- Units: 75th Ranger Regiment B Squadron, 1st Special Forces Operational Detachment-Delta 193rd Infantry Brigade
- Conflicts: Operation Eagle Claw; Central American crisis; Operation Urgent Fury; Operation Just Cause
- Other work: Security consultant, news commentator, author, screenwriter, actor

Eric L. Haney (born August 22, 1952) is a retired member of the United States Army counterterrorist unit, the 1st Special Forces Operational Detachment-Delta (1SFOD-D), more commonly known as Delta Force. In recent years he has been writing on terrorism, guerrilla warfare, and special operations. Haney is the author of Inside Delta Force, a memoir of his time in the elite unit, in which he also writes about his participation in the aborted 1980 Operation Eagle Claw mission to Iran to free American hostages.

He was a co-executive producer of the CBS television series The Unit, created by David Mamet and inspired by Haney's special operations experiences. Previously, Haney was a technical consultant on Mamet's 2004 film Spartan, starring Val Kilmer.

== Early life and education ==
Haney was born on August 22, 1952, and raised in rural Lindale, Georgia, just outside the town of Rome. He graduated from Pepperell High School in 1970.

== Military career ==
Haney joined the Army just out of high school in 1970 and became a platoon sergeant by the time he was 22. He served for several years in the 75th Ranger Regiment as an infantryman and was slated to become an instructor. In 1978 he volunteered for and was selected to train with a new elite counter-terrorism unit that the Army was creating. Of the 163 soldiers that tried out, Haney was one of only 12 to succeed. This unit became operational in 1978 as the 1st SFOD-D, or Delta Force, with Haney joining the unit at least 13 months later; following further training and operational acceptance nearly six months after that, he became a full member of the unit. The unit had been formed and organized by Colonel Charles Beckwith approximately 19 months before Haney became an asset and operator with the unit. Haney served in the unit until 1986, participating in a number of special operations in Latin America and the Middle East.

After his promotion to Command Sergeant Major, the rank he held until his retirement in 1990, Haney left Delta and joined the 193rd Infantry Brigade in Panama.

=== Iran: Operation Eagle Claw ===
In 1980, the United States launched Operation Eagle Claw, an attempt to end the Iran hostage crisis with a commando raid. Haney was one of the Delta operators who took part. He was inside a parked C-130 tanker/transport aircraft that caught fire and exploded when a Navy RH-53D helicopter piloted by a Marine aircrew collided with it after the mission had been aborted and the unit was preparing to extricate. After the debacle, he and other Delta operators were told to "take a vacation" in order to avoid media scrutiny.

=== Honduras ===
In 1981, Haney and two Delta Force operators were deployed to Honduras to train Honduran Special Forces. They were sent on a mission to intercept and destroy a force of Honduran communist guerrillas that had infiltrated from Nicaragua. The 100 or so rebels allegedly were being led by an advisor from the Nicaraguan Sandinista Army.

Haney wrote that his team, composed of Delta operators and Honduran special forces soldiers, tracked the guerrillas to a mountain sanctuary in the jungle. During an assault on the hilltop, Haney noticed a guerrilla using a radio. Taking him for the leader, he shot and killed him. Haney later discovered the man was David Arturo Báez, a Nicaraguan-born U.S. citizen and former Army Special Forces soldier Haney had met during his Delta selection tests.

In his memoir, Haney questioned whether Báez had joined the Sandinistas or was working for the United States as a CIA operative up until his death (Báez is referred to in Haney's book as "Enrique 'Keekee' Sáenz").

Several former Delta members who were there, including his Squadron Commander, have disputed the incident and stated it is a fabrication. However, in an interview published in the Miami Herald, Baez's family said they heard accounts of his death which resemble those described in the book.

Haney also stated in his book that his unit had twice been ordered in 1981 to get ready for missions to rescue Vietnam war POWs still being held in southeast Asia only for the missions to be cancelled at the last minute. He said that he came to believe that they were scrubbed on orders from government officials, who were afraid of embarrassment and damage to their reputations and careers if word had gotten out that they'd left prisoners behind. He also said that years later a former senior North Vietnamese diplomat asked him why the US never tried to get their POWs back after the war ended.

=== Beirut ===
During the 1982 Marines operation in Lebanon, Haney was deployed with other Delta Force members to train local Lebanese as part of the U.S. Embassy security detail. Later, he and his teammates were tasked with locating and eliminating snipers who were targeting U.S. Marines deployed as part of a United Nations peacekeeping mission.

=== Grenada: Operation Urgent Fury ===
In 1983, during the U.S. invasion of Grenada in Operation Urgent Fury, Haney and other Delta operators were assigned to raid Richmond Hill Prison thought to hold political prisoners. Their helicopters came under heavy enemy fire, and they discovered the prison was empty. The raid was called off.

=== Panama: Operation Just Cause ===
In 1989, the U.S. invaded the Republic of Panama in Operation Just Cause. Haney was Command Sergeant Major of the 193rd Infantry Brigade. He was involved in a fire fight along with C Co. 5/87th Inf. (Light) "Panthers", 193rd Inf. Brigade, in which Panamanian forces attempted to assassinate newly elected Panamanian Vice President Ford. Panamanian forces suffered heavy losses, while no U.S. soldiers were killed. This took place at the DNTT (Direccion Nacional de Transporte Terrestre), which served as the Headquarters of the National Police.

== Book criticism ==
Since the publication of Inside Delta Force in 2002 and Haney's subsequent success with The Unit television show, three of his former Delta colleagues accused him of embellishing his accomplishments within the unit and fabricating several of the events depicted. Criticism includes Haney's claim that he was a "founding member" of Delta Force as other former members consider there was only one "founder", Colonel Charlie Beckwith, who helped establish the unit and was its first commanding officer.

One such colleague, Logan Fitch, who first wrote publicly of the Desert One mission for Penthouse Magazine in 1984, called Haney a "crass opportunist" for capitalizing on his past for personal gain. Haney maintains the accuracy of his book.

Another member criticized Haney for revealing too much about Delta Force's training, tactics and early missions. A U.S. Army historian has questioned whether this was an issue, given that the information contained in Haney's book was current during the late-1970s and early-1980s and that Delta Force would certainly have changed their procedures since then. Moreover, operational information offered by Delta veterans had been made public before, for instance in Black Hawk Down, Mark Bowden's book about the Battle of Mogadishu, and most notably in Delta Force: The Army's Elite Counterterrorist Unit, Beckwith's own account about the formation and training of the unit.

== Post-military career ==
After retiring from the Army in 1990, Haney was employed as a freelance security consultant and trainer. He worked within the United States and abroad as a bodyguard, trainer for military and police forces, and private kidnap rescuer.

Some of Haney's assignments in the private sector include conducting the ransom negotiation and ransom hand-over for a kidnapped oil executive in Colombia, and helping governments in two Middle Eastern countries develop their special forces capabilities. He also worked for several years as personal security detail leader for several high-profile clients, such as Saudi Prince Khalid al Faisal and Haitian President Jean-Bertrand Aristide upon his return from exile in 1994.

During the 1990s, Haney undertook security consulting work in Algeria on a gas pipeline project, and started a contract aviation company in Liberia. Some time later, Haney was approached about organizing and leading a coup attempt in another African nation. He claims to have subsequently thwarted the coup.

Following the September 11 attacks, Haney became a television commentator on military affairs and terrorism, appearing on CNN, Fox News, CBS News, The O'Reilly Factor and MSNBC. He has expressed opinions strongly critical of the planning and implementation of Operation Iraqi Freedom.

Haney was the host of a television series entitled "Spymaster USA," which aired on The Learning Channel in 2004.

Haney was involved as a writer, producer, and technical advisor for the CBS television series The Unit, loosely based on his book. Haney also made a cameo appearance on the show as an Army recruiting officer.

Haney made a cameo appearance in the 2010 film Iron Man 2 portraying USAF commanding officer, General Meade.

== Bibliography ==
- Inside Delta Force (2002), ISBN 0-385-73251-1
- Beyond Shock and Awe: Warfare in the 21st Century (2006) (ed., with Brian M. Thomsen) ISBN 0-425-20798-6.
- No Man's Land (2010), ISBN 0-425-23300-6 ISBN 978-0425233009
- Low Country (2010), ISBN 978-0-425-23814-1
- The Prefect of Panama (2018), ISBN 978-1-682-61612-3

== See also ==
- Multinational Force in Lebanon
- 1983 Beirut barracks bombing
- United States Special Operations Command
- List of Delta Force members
