= The HALO Corporation =

The HALO Corporation is a San Diego–based company that provides safety, security and disaster relief.

Halo was started in 2006 after Hurricane Katrina to fill the gaps between security and humanitarian aid. Halo's work was featured on Kidnap and Rescue on The Discovery Channel. The President of Halo narrates the show.

Halo assists private citizens as well as government agencies and departments who need rescue, training, planning or logistical support. Halo instructors come from military and government agencies. Halo offers courses on counterterrorism, public safety, and operational/tactics.

HALO hosts a Bicoastal Counter Terrorism summit annually.
