= Sean Naylor =

Canadian journalist

- Born: Sean D. Naylor; Calgary, Alberta, Canada
- Occupations: Journalist and writer
- Website: Official website

Sean D. Naylor is a Canadian journalist. Naylor was the National Security Correspondent for Yahoo News. He previously covered intelligence and counterterrorism for Foreign Policy and spent over 20 years at Army Times, with stints as an embedded reporter with troops in Somalia, Haiti, the Balkans, Afghanistan and Iraq. Naylor has freelanced for The New York Times and Newsweek and is the author of two books, Not a Good Day to Die: The Untold Story of Operation Anaconda and Relentless Strike: The Secret History of Joint Special Operations Command.

== Early life ==
Born in 1966 in Calgary, Alberta, Canada to British parents, a geologist and a journalist, Naylor earned a master's degree in international relations in 1990 from Boston University. From the age of 18 months until the eve of his ninth birthday, he lived in Surrey, England. He then moved to Dublin, Ireland, and became a music journalist at age 16.

== Writing career ==
After graduating from Boston University, where he studied journalism on a scholarship, he joined Army Times. Naylor's beats included U.S. Army training, readiness and the service's senior leadership. He has covered the military in Pakistan, Somalia and Haiti.

In 1995, Naylor co-wrote his first book, Clash of Chariots: The Great Tank Battles.

In January 2002, the 101st Airborne Division took a couple dozen journalists, including Naylor, into Afghanistan with Task Force Rakkasan. Naylor spent almost four months covering the War in Afghanistan, including several days in the Shah-i-Kot Valley at the start of Operation Anaconda. He returned to the valley at the end of the operation with troops from the 10th Mountain Division. He was one of eight journalists allowed to accompany the troops into battle during Operation Anaconda, and spent the following three years interviewing almost 200 participants and accessed secret documents that explained the full role of the Advanced Force Operations in Operation Anaconda. With this information, Naylor wrote his second book, Not a Good Day to Die: The Untold Story of Operation Anaconda, published in 2005.

In 2015, his book Relentless Strike: The Secret History of Joint Special Operations Command was published by St. Martin's Press.

== Bibliography ==
- Donnelly, Thomas, Sean Naylor, and Walter J. Boyne. Clash of Chariots: The Great Tank Battles. New York: Berkley Books, 1996. ISBN 042515307X. OCLC 34515692.
- Naylor, Sean. Not a Good Day to Die: The Untold Story of Operation Anaconda. New York: Berkley Books, 2005. ISBN 0425196097. OCLC 56592513.
- Naylor, Sean. Relentless Strike: The Secret History of Joint Special Operations Command. New York: St. Martin's Press, 2015. ISBN 978-1-4668-7622-4
