= Delta Force =

US Army tier one special operations force

1st Special Forces Operational Detachment–Delta (Airborne)
- USASOC's shoulder sleeve insignia worn by Delta members, with a Fairbairn–Sykes fighting knife inside the outline of an arrowhead
- Founded: 19 November 1977; 48 years ago
- Country: United States
- Branch: United States Army
- Type: Special mission unit
- Role: Special operations Counterterrorism
- Size: Classified see below
- Part of: Joint Special Operations Command; U.S. Army Special Operations Command
- Headquarters: Fort Bragg, North Carolina, U.S.
- Nicknames: "The Unit", Combat Applications Group (CAG), Task Force Green, "D'Boys"
- Motto: Sine Pari (Without Equal)
- Engagements: Cold War; Aftermath of the Iranian Revolution; Iran hostage crisis; Operation Eagle Claw; United States invasion of Grenada; Colombian conflict; Central American crisis; United States invasion of Panama; Operation Acid Gambit; Operation Nifty Package; Arab Cold War; Gulf War; Post–Cold War era; War on drugs; Operation Snowcap; Mexican drug war; Operation Black Swan; Crisis in Venezuela; Operation Southern Spear; United States oil blockade during Operation Southern Spear; 2026 United States Intervention in Venezuela; Somali Civil War; United Nations Operation in Somalia II; Operation Gothic Serpent; Black Hawk Down Incident; Operation Uphold Democracy; Yugoslav Wars; Bosnian War; NATO intervention in Bosnia; Kosovo War; Internal conflict in Peru; Global War on Terrorism; Operation Enduring Freedom; Afghan conflict; War in Afghanistan; United States invasion of Afghanistan; Battle of Tora Bora; Operation Anaconda; 2021 Kabul airlift; Operation Juniper Shield; Libyan crisis; Aftermath of the Libyan civil war; Factional violence in Libya; 2012 Benghazi attack; 2014 American raid in Libya; Insurgency in Jammu and Kashmir; Iraq War; 2003 invasion of Iraq; Battle of Haditha Dam; Iraqi insurgency (2003–2011); 2003–2006 phase of the Iraqi insurgency; Killing of Qusay and Uday Hussein; Operation Red Dawn; First Battle of Fallujah; Second Battle of Fallujah; Iraqi civil war (2006–2008); Operation Larchwood 4; Second Battle of Ramadi; 2008–2011 phase of the Iraqi insurgency; 2008 Abu Kamal raid; War against the Islamic State; Operation Inherent Resolve; Syrian civil war; Foreign involvement in the Syrian civil war; United States intervention in Syria; May 2015 U.S. special forces raid in Syria; Operation Kayla Mueller; War in Iraq; 2015 Hawija prison raid; 2026 Iran war; 2026 United States F-15E rescue operation in Iran
- Decorations: Presidential Unit Citation; Joint Meritorious Unit Award; Valorous Unit Award

Commanders
- Current commander: COL Christopher Countouriotis
- Notable commanders: Charles Alvin Beckwith; William F. Garrison; William G. Boykin; Peter J. Schoomaker; Eldon A. Bargewell; Gary L. Harrell; Bennet S. Sacolick; Austin S. Miller; Mark J. O'Neil; James Jarrard; Christopher T. Donahue

Insignia
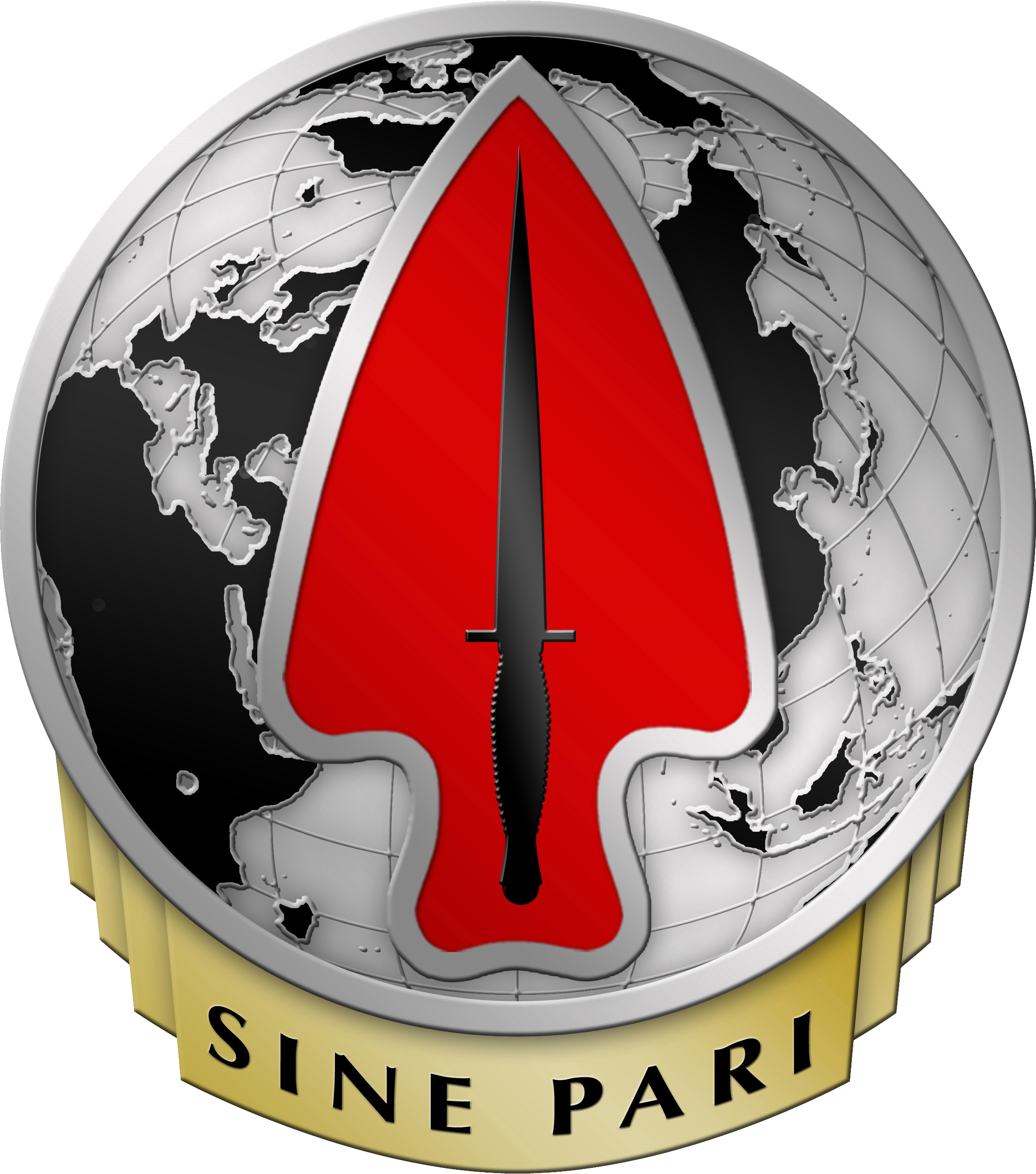
- USASOC Distinctive Unit Insignia worn by Delta operators

The 1st Special Forces Operational Detachment–Delta (1st SFOD-D), also known as Delta Force, Combat Applications Group (CAG), or within Joint Special Operations Command (JSOC) as Task Force Green, is a special operations force of the United States Army under the operational control of JSOC. The unit's missions primarily involve counterterrorism, hostage rescue, direct action, and special reconnaissance, often against high-value targets.

Delta Force, along with the 75th Ranger Regiment's Regimental Reconnaissance Company, Intelligence Support Activity, and its Navy and Air Force counterparts, DEVGRU (SEAL Team Six) and the 24th Special Tactics Squadron, respectively, is one of the U.S. military's tier-one special mission units that are tasked with performing the most complex, covert, and dangerous missions directed by the president of the United States and the secretary of defense.

Most Delta Force operators and combat support members are selected from the Army Special Operations Command's 75th Ranger Regiment and U.S. Army Special Forces, though selection is open to other special operations and conventional units across the Army and other military branches.

== Formation ==
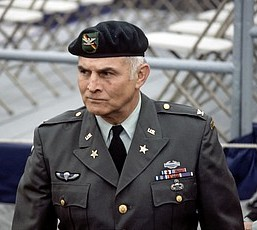
Delta Force's founder Charles Beckwith in 1980

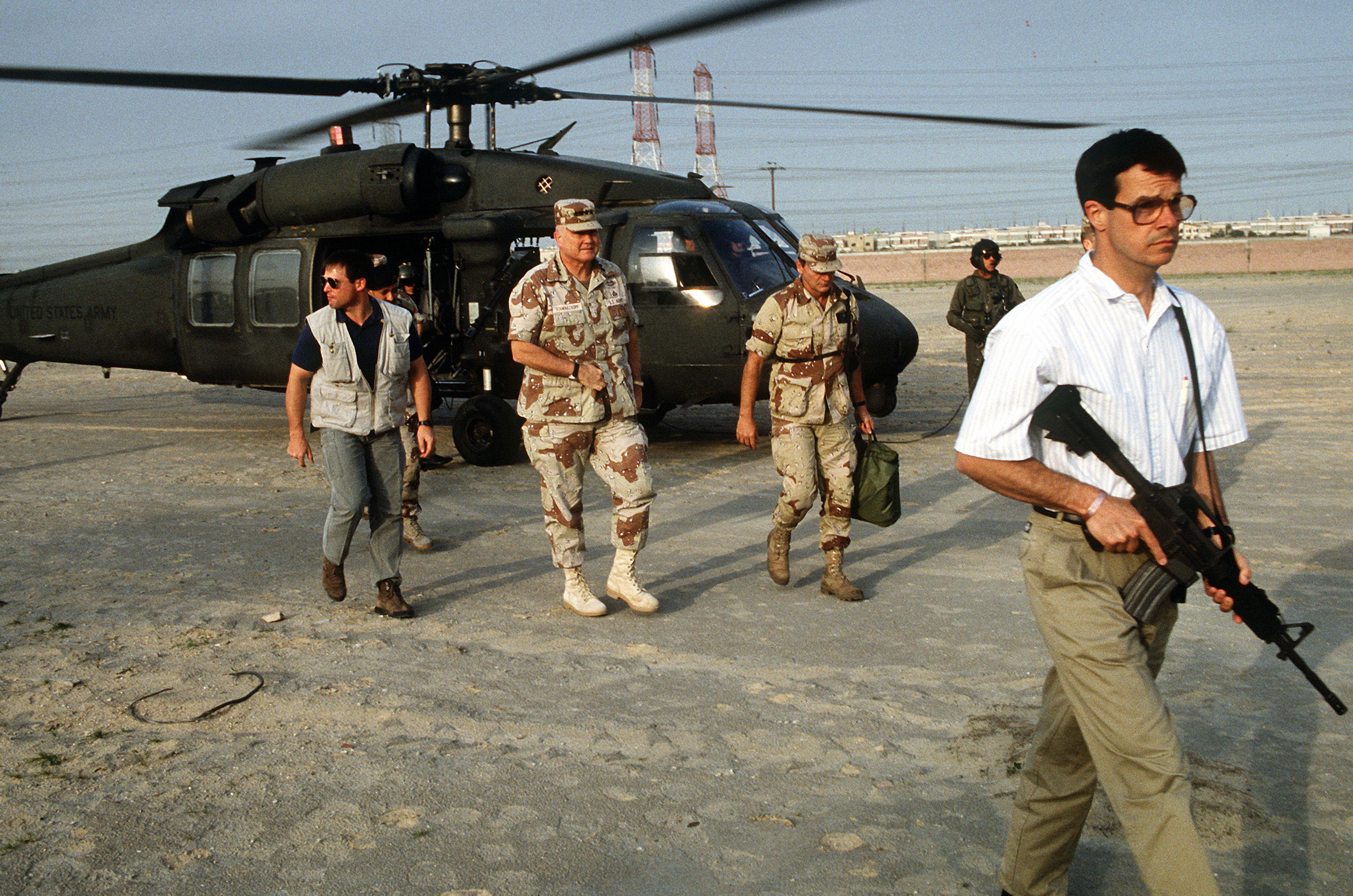
Delta Force bodyguards in civilian clothing providing close protection to General Norman Schwarzkopf during the Gulf War, 1991

Delta Force was created in 1977 after numerous well-publicized terrorist incidents led the U.S. government to develop a full-time counter-terrorism unit.

Key military and government figures were briefed on this type of unit in the early 1960s. Charlie Beckwith, a Special Forces (Green Berets) officer and Vietnam War veteran, served as an exchange officer with the British Army's 22 Special Air Service Regiment during the Malayan Emergency. On his return, Beckwith presented a detailed report highlighting the U.S. Army's vulnerability in not having an SAS-type unit. U.S. Army Special Forces in that period focused on unconventional warfare providing training and medical care to indigenous resistance fighters, but Beckwith recognized the need for "not only a force of teachers, but a force of doers".

He envisioned highly adaptable and completely autonomous small teams with a broad array of special skills for direct action and counter-terrorism missions. He briefed military and government figures, who were resistant to creating a new unit outside of Special Forces, or changing existing methods.

In the mid-1970s, as the threat of terrorism grew, the Pentagon and Army senior leaders appointed Beckwith to form the unit. Beckwith estimated that it would take 24 months to get his new unit mission ready. Beckwith's estimate came from a conversation he had had earlier with Brigadier John Watts while in England in 1976. Watts made it clear to Beckwith that it would take eighteen months to build a squadron, but advised him to tell Army leaders that it would take two years, and not to "let anyone talk (him) out of this." To justify why it would take two years to build Delta, Beckwith and his staff drafted what they dubbed the "Robert Redford Paper," which outlined its necessities and historical precedents for a four-phase selection/assessment process.

Delta Force was established on 19 November 1977, by Beckwith and Colonel Thomas Henry. Meanwhile, Colonel Bob "Black Gloves" Mountel of the 5th Special Forces Group created a unit to bridge the short-term gap that existed until Delta was ready, dubbed Blue Light.

In early 1978, the initial members of the unit were screened from volunteers and put through a specialized selection process, involving a series of land navigation problems in mountainous terrain while carrying increasing weight. The purpose was to test candidates' endurance, stamina, willingness to endure, and mental resolve. The first training course lasted from April to September 1978. In fall 1979, Delta Force was certified as fully mission capable, right before the Iran hostage crisis.

On 4 November 1979, 63 American diplomats and citizens were taken captive in the U.S. embassy in Tehran, Iran. In the following days, a further 3 American hostages were seized at the Iranian Foreign Ministry. Delta Force was tasked to plan and execute Operation Eagle Claw, the effort to recover the remaining 53 hostages that were not released by the Iranians from the embassy by force on the nights of 24 and 25 April in 1980. The operation was aborted due to helicopter failures.

The review commission that examined the failure found 23 problems with the operation, among them unexpected weather encountered by the aircraft, command-and-control problems between the multi-service component commanders, a collision between a helicopter and a ground-refueling tanker aircraft, and mechanical problems that reduced the number of available helicopters from eight to five (one fewer than the minimum desired) before the mission contingent could leave the trans-loading/refueling site.

After the failed operation, the U.S. government realized more changes were needed. The 160th Special Operations Aviation Regiment (Airborne), also known as the "Night Stalkers", was created for special operations requiring air support. The Navy's SEAL Team Six, an earlier incarnation of the current Naval Special Warfare Development Group, was created for maritime counter-terrorism operations. The Joint Special Operations Command was created for command and control of the military's various counter-terrorism units.

== Organization and structure ==
The unit is under the organization of the U.S. Army Special Operations Command (USASOC), and controlled by the Joint Special Operations Command (JSOC). Command of 1st SFOD-D is a colonel's billet. Virtually all information about the unit is highly classified. Details about specific missions or operations generally are not available publicly. The unit is headquartered at Fort Bragg, North Carolina.

Delta Force's structure is similar to the British 22 SAS Regiment, which inspired Delta's formation. In 2001's Not a Good Day to Die: The Untold Story of Operation Anaconda, Army Times staff writer Sean Naylor describes Delta as having, at the time, nearly 1,000 soldiers, of whom about 250 to 300 are trained to conduct direct action and hostage rescue operations. The rest are combat support and service support personnel who are among the very best in their fields.

Naylor further details Delta Force's structure in his book Relentless Strike: The Secret History of Joint Special Operations Command. He describes a few formations in Delta, primarily the following operational elements:

- A Squadron (Assault)
- B Squadron (Assault)
- C Squadron (Assault)
- D Squadron (Assault)
- E Squadron (Aviation)
- F Squadron (CWMD)
- G Squadron (Advanced Force Operations)
- Signal Squadron
- Combat Support Squadron
- Combat Development Directorate
- Selection and Training

A, B, C, and D Squadrons are sabre squadrons (assault). C Squadron was activated around 1990 and D Squadron in 2006. Combat Support Squadron was activated in 2005. E Squadron was activated in 1989 and is stationed separately in Fort Eustis, Virginia, where it is known as the Aviation Technology Office. An earlier forerunner of the unit was known as SeaSpray.

Within each saber squadron there are three troops: troops 1 and 2 (assault) and troop 3 (reconnaissance). Each squadron is led by a lieutenant colonel (O-5), an executive officer, and a command sergeant major (E-9). Troops are led by captains (O-3) or majors (O-4) known as the troop commanders who are assisted by sergeants major (E-9), known as troop sergeants major.

Each assault troop has four teams, each one led by a team leader, a master sergeant (E-8) or sergeant first class (E-7), and an assistant team leader who can have the same rank. Each team usually has five or six members.

=== Recruitment ===
Since the 1990s, the Army has posted recruitment notices for the 1st SFOD-D. The Army has never released an official fact sheet for the unit. The recruitment notices in Fort Bragg's newspaper, Paraglide, refer to Delta Force by name, and label it "...the U.S. Army's special operations unit organized for the conduct of missions requiring rapid response with surgical application of a wide variety of unique special operations skills...".

The notice states that applicants must be in the grade of E-4 to E-8, have at least two and a half years of service remaining in their enlistment, be 22 years or older, and have an Armed Services Vocational Aptitude Battery GT score of 110 or higher to attend a briefing to be considered for admission. Candidates must be airborne qualified or volunteer for airborne training.

Officer candidates need to be O-3 or O-4. All candidates must be eligible for a security clearance level of "secret" and have not been convicted by court-martial or have disciplinary action noted in their official military personnel file under the provisions of Article 15 of the Uniform Code of Military Justice.

In June 2006, during a session of the Committee on Armed Services, General Wayne Downing testified before the U.S. House of Representatives that "[t]he Delta Force is probably 70 percent Rangers who have come out of either a Ranger [to] Special Forces track or directly from [the] Ranger Regiment to Delta".

=== Selection process ===
Selection is held twice a year at Camp Dawson, West Virginia, and lasts four weeks. Selections take place in late March to late April, and late September to late October. Eric Haney's 2002 book Inside Delta Force described the selection course and its inception in detail. Haney wrote that the course began with standard tests including push-ups, sit-ups, and a 2-mile (3.2 km) run, an inverted crawl and a 110-yard (330 ft; 100 m) swim fully dressed. The candidates were then put through a series of land navigation courses, one of which required them to travel 18 miles (29 km) at night while carrying a 40-pound (18 kg) rucksack.

With every successive challenge, the distance to cover and the weight of the rucksack are increased, while less time is allotted. The final challenge was a 40-mile (64 km) march with a 45-pound (20 kg) rucksack over rough terrain, that had to be completed in an unknown amount of time. This was colloquially known as "The Long Walk". Haney wrote that only the senior officer and NCO in charge of selection were allowed to see the set time limits, but all assessment and selection tasks and conditions were set by Delta training cadre.

The mental portion of the testing began with numerous psychological exams. Each candidate was then called to face a board of Delta instructors, unit psychologists, and the Delta commander, who asked the candidate a barrage of questions and then dissected every response and mannerism to exhaust the candidate mentally. The commander then approaches the candidate and informs him if he has been selected.

Those who passed the screening process underwent an intense six-month Operator Training Course (OTC), to learn counter-terrorism and counter-intelligence techniques, and training with firearms and other weapons. Participants were allowed very little contact with friends and family for the duration.

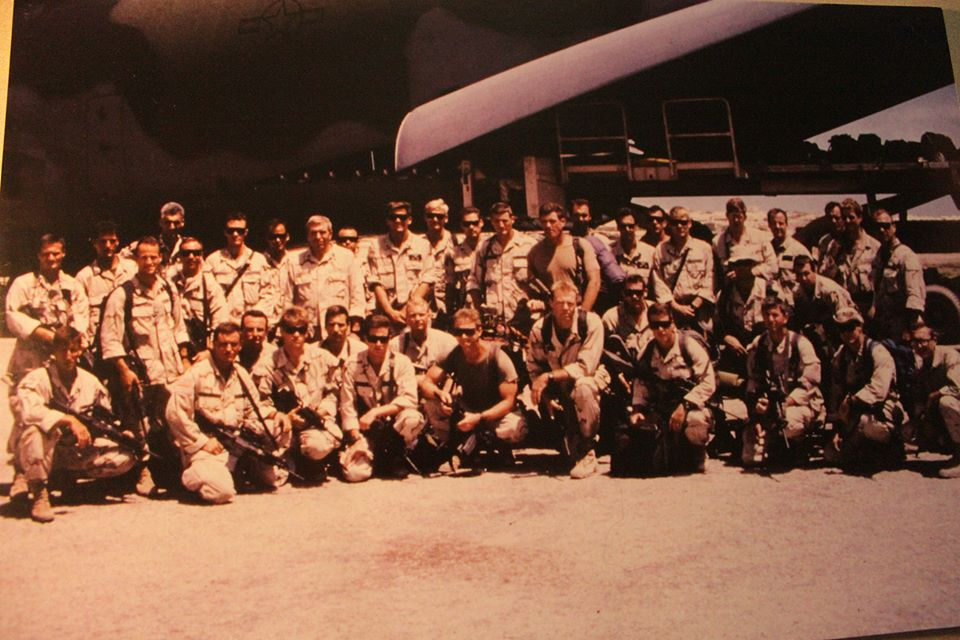
Delta C Squadron, Mogadishu, Somalia, September 1993

In an interview, former Delta operator Paul Howe mentioned the high attrition rate of the Delta selection course. He said that out of his two classes of 120 applicants each, 12 to 14 completed the selection. Former Navy SEAL, DEVGRU and Delta operator Kevin Holland stated that in his selection class, 120 candidates started, 16 passed and eight finished OTC.

The Central Intelligence Agency's secretive Special Activities Center (SAC) and more specifically its Special Operations Group (SOG), often works with – and recruits – former operators from Delta Force.

=== Training ===
According to Eric Haney, the unit's Operator Training Course is approximately six months long. While the course is constantly changing, the skills taught broadly include the following:

- Marksmanship:
  - The trainees shoot without aiming down sights at stationary targets at close range until they gain almost complete accuracy, then progress to moving targets.
  - Once these shooting skills are perfected, trainees move to a shoot house and clear rooms of "enemy" targets – first one only, then two at a time, then three, and finally four. When all trainees can demonstrate the sufficient skill required, "hostages" are added to the mix.
- Demolitions and breaching:
  - Trainees learn how to pick many different locks, including those on cars and safes.
  - Advanced demolition and bomb-making using common materials.
- Combined skills (the FBI, FAA, and other agencies were used to advise on the training of this portion of OTC):
  - The new Delta operators use demolition and marksmanship at the shoot house and other training facilities to train for hostage and counter-terrorist operations with assault and sniper troops working together. They practice terrorist or hostage situations in buildings, aircraft, and other settings.
  - All trainees learn how to set sniper positions around a building containing hostages. They learn the proper ways to set up a tactical operations center (TOC) and communicate in an organized manner. Although Delta has specialized sniper troops, all members go through this training.
  - The students then go back to the shoot house and the "hostages" are replaced with other students and Delta Force members. Live ammunition is known to have been used in these exercises, to test the students, and build trust between one another.
- Tradecraft (during the first OTCs and Delta creation, CIA personnel were used to teach this portion of the training):
  - Students learn different espionage-related skills, such as dead drops, brief encounters, pickups, load and unload signals, danger and safe signals, surveillance and counter-surveillance.
- Executive protection (during the first OTCs and creation of Delta, the U.S. State Department's Diplomatic Security Service and the United States Secret Service were consulted and advised Delta):
  - Students take an advanced driving course to learn to use a vehicle or many vehicles as defensive and offensive weapons.
  - They then learn techniques for VIP and diplomatic protection developed by the Secret Service and DSS.
- Culmination exercise:
  - A final test requires the students to apply and dynamically adapt all of the skills that they have learned.

Delta Force trains with other foreign special operations units to improve tactics and increase relationships with them, including the Australian Special Air Service Regiment, the British Special Air Service, and Canada's Joint Task Force 2.

=== Unit name ===
In a 2010 article, Marc Ambinder reported that Army Compartmented Elements (ACE) was a new cover name for Delta Force. However, Ambinder subsequently wrote an e-book about JSOC in which he reported that the Army Compartmented Elements is a different unit from Delta.

In January 2022 it was reported that the name of the unit may have recently been changed to the 3rd Operational Support Group.

== Secrecy ==
The Department of Defense tightly controls information about Delta Force and usually refuses to comment publicly on the highly secretive unit and its activities, unless the unit is part of a major operation or a unit member has been killed. Delta operators are granted an enormous amount of flexibility and autonomy during military operations overseas. Relaxed grooming standards such as civilian hairstyles and facial hair are allowed to enable the members to blend in and avoid recognition as military personnel.

2023 Israel incident

During President Joe Biden's visit to Israel, the White House accidentally published a photo of Delta Force operators with unblurred faces and tattoos, drawing scrutiny. The White House later issued an apology for the incident.

== The term "operator" ==
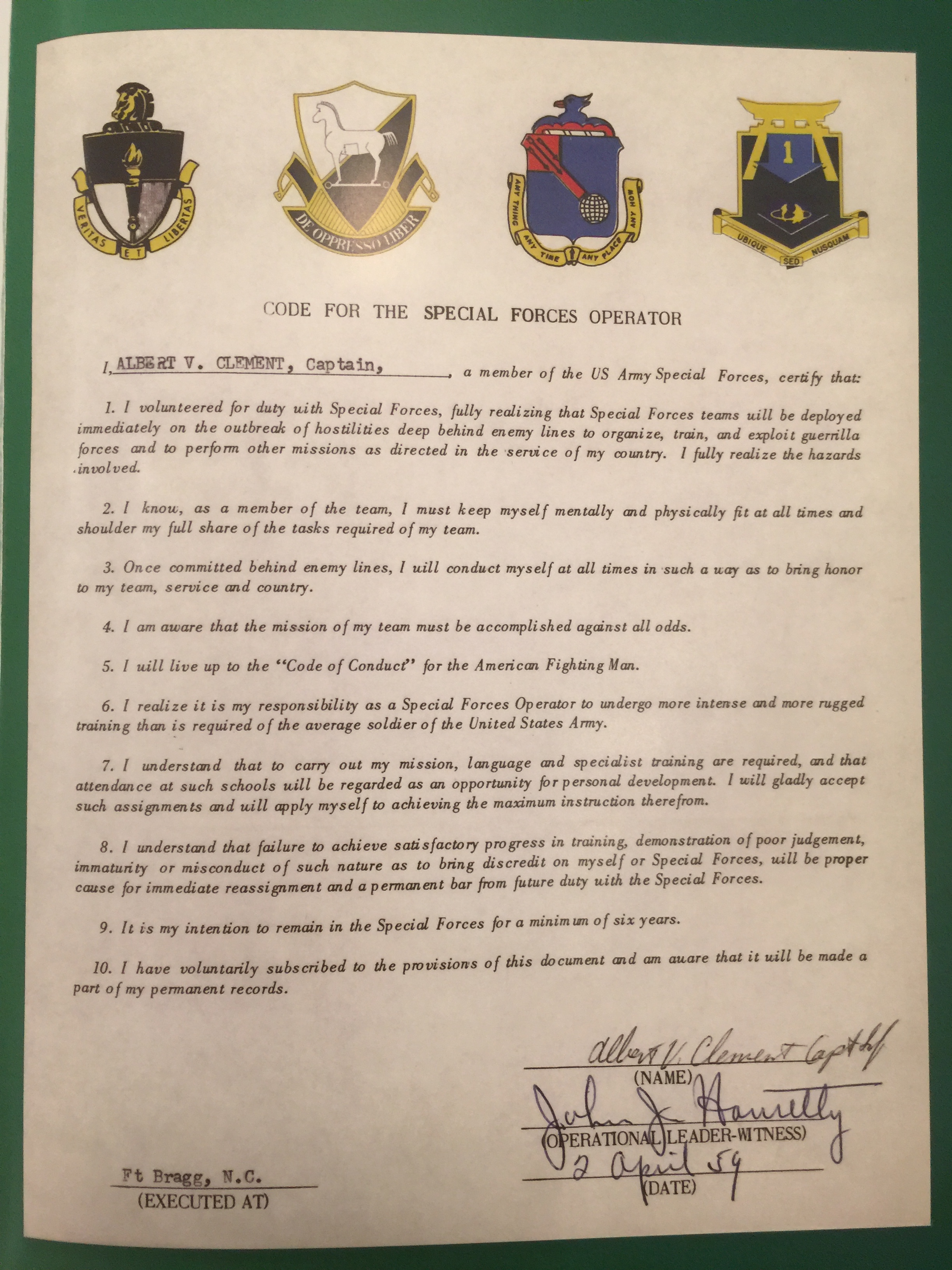
An example of the "Code of the Special Forces Operator", dated 1959. This example pre-dates Delta.

Inside the United States special operations community, an operator is a Delta Force member who has completed selection and has finished OTC (Operator Training Course). "Operator" was used by Delta Force to distinguish between operators (assaulters and snipers) and combat support assigned to the unit.

In 2018, Charles H. Briscoe, a former historian with Army Special Operations Command, wrote:

In the last fifteen to twenty years, the practice of calling a Special Forces (SF) soldier an 'operator' has caused considerable rancor within Army special mission units (SMU), the original of which adopted that appellation in the late 1970s. Today, all U.S. military service special operations forces and their higher headquarters apply that moniker to their sea, land, and air warfighters. Even staff personnel adopt that term for themselves.

Later, Briscoe continues:

SF did not misappropriate the appellation. Unbeknownst to most members of the ARSOF community, that moniker was adopted by Special Forces in the mid to late 1950s. SF-qualified officers and enlisted soldiers voluntarily subscribed to the provisions of the 'Code of the Special Forces Operator' and pledged themselves to its tenets by witnessed signature.

== Operations ==
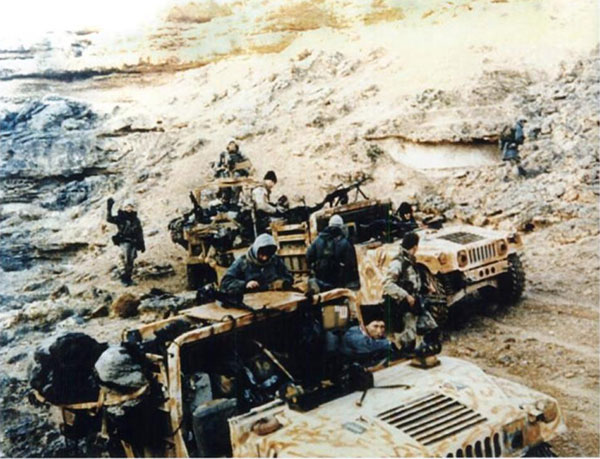
Delta Force operators, pictured behind Iraqi lines during the 1991 Persian Gulf War

Most operations assigned to Delta are classified, but some details have become public knowledge. For service during Operation Urgent Fury (1983), the United States' invasion of Grenada, Delta was awarded the Joint Meritorious Unit Award. The unit was awarded the Valorous Unit Award for extraordinary heroism during the Modelo Prison hostage rescue mission and the capture of Manuel Noriega in December 1989 during Operation Just Cause in Panama.

In 1993, 1st SFOD-D operators from C Squadron were involved in Operation Gothic Serpent in Somalia. Two of those operators, MSG Gary Gordon and SFC Randy Shughart, were posthumously awarded the Medal of Honor for their actions on 3 October 1993 during the Battle of Mogadishu.

During Operation Enduring Freedom and Operation Iraqi Freedom, 1st SFOD-D was awarded the Presidential Unit Citation for combat operations in Afghanistan from 4 October 2001 to 15 March 2002 and Iraq from 19 March 2003 to 13 December 2003.

On 26 October 2019, Delta operators accompanied by members of the 75th Ranger Regiment conducted a raid on the compound of Islamic State leader Abu Bakr al-Baghdadi, where he killed himself by detonating a suicide belt.

On 3 January 2026, Delta operators captured Venezuelan president Nicolás Maduro and his wife Cilia Flores during the 2026 United States airstrikes in Venezuela.

== See also ==
- List of Delta Force members
- List of operations conducted by Delta Force
- Joint Special Operations Command
- SEAL Team Six U.S. Navy counterpart

== Bibliography ==
- Ambinder, Marc; Grady, D. B. (2012). The Command: Deep Inside the President's Secret Army. Hoboken, New Jersey: John Wiley & Sons. ISBN 978-1-118-34672-3.
- Beckwith, Charlie; Knox, Donald (2000) [1983]. Delta Force: The Army's Elite Counterterrorist Unit (Paperback ed.). Avon Books. ISBN 978-0-380-80939-4.
- Bowden, Mark (1999). Black Hawk Down: A Story of Modern War. Atlantic Monthly Press. ISBN 978-0-87113-738-8. Archived.
- Bowden, Mark (2001). Killing Pablo : The Hunt for the World's Greatest Outlaw (1st ed.). New York: Atlantic Monthly Press. ISBN 978-0871137838.
- Bowden, Mark (2006). Guests of the Ayatollah: The First Battle in America's War with Militant Islam. New York: Atlantic Monthly Press. ISBN 978-0-87113-925-2. OCLC 62738726.
- Boykin, William G. (2008). Never Surrender : A Soldier's Journey to the Crossroads of Faith and Freedom (1st ed.). New York: FaithWords. ISBN 978-0-446-59361-8. OCLC 882106240.
- Cawthorne, Nigel (2008). The Mammoth Book of Inside the Elite Forces. London: Robinson Publishing. ISBN 978-1845298210. OCLC 176894746.
- Fury, Dalton (2008). Kill Bin Laden : A Delta Force Commander's Account of the Hunt for the World's Most Wanted Man (1st ed.). New York: St. Martin's Press. ISBN 9780312384395. OCLC 1035934309.
- Gabriel, Richard A. (1985). Military Incompetence: Why the American Military Doesn't Win. Farrar, Straus and Giroux. ISBN 978-0-374-52137-0.
- Griswold, Terry; Giangreco, D. M. (1992). Delta, America's Elite Counterterrorist Force. Osceola, WI: Motorbooks International. ISBN 978-0879386153. OCLC 25549191.
- Haney, Eric L. (2002). Inside Delta Force. New York: Delacorte Press. ISBN 978-0385336031.
- National Geographic documentary: Road to Baghdad.
- Naylor, Sean (2006). Not a Good Day to Die: The Untold Story of Operation Anaconda. Berkley Books. ISBN 978-0-425-19609-0.
- Naylor, Sean (2015). Relentless Strike: The Secret History of Joint Special Operations Command. New York: St. Martin's Griffin. ISBN 9781250014542. OCLC 908554550.
- Pushies, Fred (2002). U.S. Counterterrorist Forces. St. Paul, MN: MBI Pub. Co. ISBN 978-0760313633.
- Satterly, Tom; Jackson, Steve (2019). All Secure : A Special Operations Soldier's Fight to Survive on the Battlefield and the Homefront (1st ed.). New York: Center Street. ISBN 978-1546076575. OCLC 1091687950.
- Schauer, Hartmut (2008). Delta Force (1st ed.). Stuttgart, DE: Motorbuch Verlag. ISBN 978-3-613-02958-3.
- Smith, Michael (2007). Killer Elite : The Inside Story of America's Most Secret Special Operations Team] (1st ed.). New York: St. Martin's Press. ISBN 978-0312362720.
