= Todd Ellis Kessler =

American television producer and writer

Todd Ellis Kessler is an American television producer and writer. He has worked in both capacities on varied series including The Practice, Crossing Jordan, Kevin Hill, The Unit and The Good Wife. He has been nominated for daytime and primetime Emmy Awards and a Writers Guild of America Award.

== Career ==
Kessler began writing for television with the NBC science fiction series Sleepwalkers in 1997. He served as an executive story editor for the series single season. Later in 1997 Kessler next became a writer for the second season of the ABC legal drama The Practice. He wrote the episodes "The Means" and "Axe Murderer".

In 1999 Kessler obtained his first production work on the science fictions series Strange World. The show was created by Howard Gordon and Tim Kring. Kessler was credited as a co-producer and also worked as a writer on the short-lived series.

Later in 1999 Kessler returned to The Practice as a co-producer and writer for the show's fourth season. He wrote the episodes "Legacy", "Marooned", "Committed" and "Settling". Kessler was promoted to producer for the fifth season but did not write any further episodes. Along with the rest of the production team Kessler was nominated for the Emmy Award for outstanding drama series for his work on the fifth season.

In 2001 Kessler became a supervising producer and writer on the legal drama Crossing Jordan. The series was created and executive produced by Tim Kring, who Kessler worked with on Strange World. Kessler wrote the first-season episodes "Believers" and "Blood Relatives" and left the crew at the end of the first season.

In 2002 Kessler became a writer and supervising producer for the medical drama MDs. Kessler wrote the episode "Open Hearts". The series was cancelled after ten episodes.

Kessler returned to television in 2004 as a supervising producer and writer for legal drama Kevin Hill. He wrote the episodes "Snack Daddy", "Homeland Insecurity", "Cardiac Episode" and "Through the Looking Glass". The show was cancelled after completing its first season. In 2006 Kessler worked as a supervising producer and writer on the second season of HBO historical drama Rome. The season did not air until early 2007. Kessler wrote the episodes "Testudo et Lepus" and "A Necessary Fiction". Rome was cancelled due to high production costs after two seasons.

In 2006 Kessler joined the crew of the action drama series The Unit. Kessler became a co-executive producer and writer for the series second season. He wrote the episodes "Report by Exception", "Johnny B. Good" and "In Loco Parentis". He returned as a co-executive producer for the third season in 2007 and wrote the episodes "Pandemonium: Part Two" and "Side Angle Side". The third season was shortened by the writers strike. Following the writer's strike Kessler returned to work on the fourth and final season of The Unit in 2008. He was promoted to executive producer and wrote the episodes "Sex Trade", "Misled and Misguided" (from a story by himself and Pete Blaber) and the series finale "Unknown Soldier".

In 2009 Kessler joined the crew of new legal drama The Good Wife as a co-executive producer and writer. Kessler was joined by Ted Humphrey who had worked as a supervising producer and writer on the fourth season of The Unit. Kessler wrote the first-season episodes "Fixed" and "Infamy". Kessler and the rest of the writing staff for the first season were nominated for a Writers Guild of America Award for best new series.

In 2011 Kessler became a writer and co-executive producer for the period drama Pan Am. He wrote the episode "The Genuine Article" with consulting producer Nick Thiel, and had story credit on "Diplomatic Relations" (Jeffrey Lieber and Craig Shapiro shared credit for teleplay). The series was cancelled after fourteen episodes.

In 2012 Kessler became a writer and co-executive producer for the musical drama Nashville. He wrote the episodes "We Live In Two Different Worlds," "There'll Be No Teardrops Tonight" (with consulting producer David Marshall Grant), and "Why Don't You Love Me." Kessler left the series after the first season.
