= Charles Alvin Beckwith =

U.S. Army Special Forces officer (1929–1994)

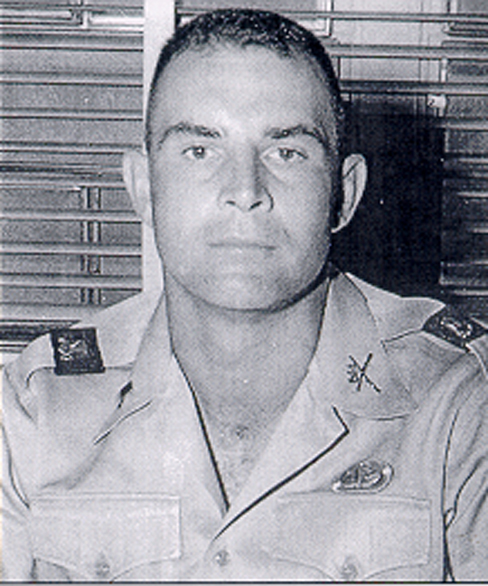
- Born: 22 January 1929; Atlanta, Georgia, U.S.
- Died: 13 June 1994 (aged 65); Austin, Texas, U.S.
- Burial place: Fort Sam Houston National Cemetery
- Education: University of Georgia
- Relatives: Paul R. Howe (son-in-law)
- Military career
- Allegiance: United States
- Branch: United States Army
- Service years: 1952–1981
- Rank: Colonel
- Nickname: "Chargin' Charlie"
- Commands: Delta Force; 2nd Battalion, 327th Airborne Infantry Regiment; Special Forces Detachment B-52 (Project DELTA)
- Conflicts: Korean War; Laotian Civil War; Malayan Emergency; Indonesia–Malaysia confrontation; Vietnam War (WIA); Operation Eagle Claw
- Awards: Silver Star (2); Legion of Merit (3); Distinguished Flying Cross; Bronze Star Medal (4); Purple Heart
- Other work: Security consultant

Charles Alvin Beckwith (22 January 1929 – 13 June 1994) was a career United States Army Special Forces officer best remembered for creating Delta Force, the premier counterterrorism and asymmetric warfare unit of the United States Army, based on his experience serving with the British Special Air Service. He served in the Indonesia–Malaysia confrontation and the Vietnam War, and attained the rank of colonel before his retirement.

== Early life and education ==
Beckwith was born in Atlanta, Georgia, on 22 January 1929, to Baptist parents Elza Dozier Beckwith (1894–1940) and Clara Eugenia Beckwith (née Rey; 1895–1973). He was an all-state football player for his high school team. He later enrolled at the University of Georgia, where he was a member of the Delta chapter of the Sigma Chi fraternity and ROTC.

Beckwith lettered in football for the Bulldogs, and was approached by the Green Bay Packers for the 1950–51 NFL draft, but turned it down in favor of a military career. He was commissioned as a second lieutenant in the United States Army in 1952.

== Career ==
After the Korean War (1950–1953) was over, then-Second Lieutenant Beckwith served as a platoon leader with Charlie Company, 17th Infantry Regiment, 7th Infantry Division in South Korea. In 1955, Beckwith was assigned to the 82nd Airborne Division as the commander of the combat support company of the 504th Parachute Infantry Regiment.

In 1958, after completing Ranger School, Beckwith joined the Special Forces and was assigned to the 7th Special Forces Group. In 1960, then-Captain Beckwith deployed to Laos for two years on Operation Hotfoot.

In 1962, Beckwith was sent as an exchange officer to the British 22 Special Air Service Regiment (SAS) where he commanded 3 Troop, A Squadron. He conducted war-time guerilla operations with the SAS during the Indonesian Confrontation. In the jungle, he contracted a case of leptospirosis so severe that doctors did not expect him to survive, but he made a full recovery within months.

Upon his return from England, Beckwith presented a detailed report outlining the Army's vulnerability in not having an SAS-type unit. For several years, Beckwith (who was still a Captain) submitted and re-submitted the report to Army brass, only to be repeatedly thwarted in his efforts. Special Forces leadership at the time thought that they had enough on their hands and did not need the trouble of creating a new unit.

Meanwhile, as the 7th SFG(A) operations officer, Beckwith went to work revolutionizing Green Beret training. Special Forces at the time focused on unconventional warfare, and especially foreign internal defense: i.e. training indigenous personnel in resistance activities. Beckwith recognized that, "Before a Special Forces Green Beret soldier could become a good unconventional soldier, he'd first have to be a good conventional one... Because I had commanded rifle and weapons companies, I was appalled on arriving in Special Forces to find officers who had never commanded conventional units."

Beckwith restructured the 7th's training, basically rewriting the book on Army special operations training from the real-world lessons he had learned with the SAS. Beckwith learned that a symbol of excellence like a beret had to be earned. Officers were being assigned to Special Forces straight out of the war college with no prior special operations experience and were given their green beret on arrival. Beckwith instituted the hard-nosed and practical training standards that would lend themselves to the birth of the modern Q-Course.

In 1965, Beckwith volunteered to return to Vietnam where he was selected to command a high-priority special forces unit Project Delta (Operational Detachment B-52). He used his SAS experience to test and select men for long-range reconnaissance operations in South Vietnam. Following his promotion to Major, Beckwith led B-52 in the rescue of the besieged Special Forces camp at the Siege of Plei Me, during which President Lyndon B. Johnson requested to speak to him directly over radio in order to congratulate and encourage him; his iron-fist disciplinarian style of running the camp is described in detail in CBS News Journalist John Laurence's book The Cat from Huế.

Beckwith was critically wounded in early 1966, when he took a .50 caliber bullet through the abdomen. His ballistic injury was so severe that medical personnel triaged him as beyond help for the second time in his military career. Once again, Beckwith made a full recovery and went on to overhaul the Florida Phase of the U.S. Army Ranger School. Beckwith transformed this phase from a scripted exercise based upon the Army's World War II experience, into a Vietnam-oriented jungle training regimen.

In 1968, following the Tet Offensive, then-Lieutenant Colonel Beckwith returned to South Vietnam, taking command of the 2nd Battalion, 327th Infantry (Airborne), 1st Brigade, 101st Airborne Division. For the nine months that he commanded the 2/327 (“No Slack”), they saw many successes in combat operations, including: Huế, Operation Mingo, Operation Jeb Stuart, Operation Nevada Eagle (clearing the Huế-Phú Bài area), and Somerset Plain (sweeping the southern portion of the A Shau Valley). The toughest job the battalion had was clearing a seven-kilometer stretch along Route 547, running west of Huế, eventually defeating the determined NVA defenders so that Fire Support Base Bastogne could be established.

From 1973 to 1974, Beckwith served as commander, Control Team "B" with the Joint Casualty Resolution Center (JCRC) located at RTAFB Nakhon Phanom, Thailand. Under the Command of BG Robert C. Kingston, USA, JCRC's sole mission was to assist the Secretaries of the Armed Services to resolve the fate of servicemen still missing and unaccounted for as a result of the hostilities throughout Indochina. JCRC had a predominantly operational role—the carrying out of field search, excavation, recovery, and repatriation activities. He was promoted to colonel and in 1975 returned to Fort Bragg, North Carolina as Commandant of the U.S. Army Special Warfare School.

=== Delta Force ===
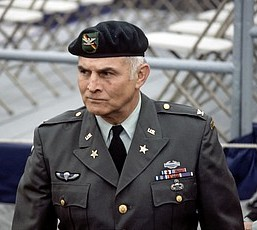
Charles Beckwith in 1980

Although Beckwith had presented proposals throughout the 1960s for an elite, highly autonomous direct-action unit, the idea had sat on the shelf for a decade. Finally, in the mid-1970s, as the threat of international terrorism became apparent, Beckwith was appointed to form his unit. During the time Beckwith was forming his unit, counter-terrorism duties fell to the special forces community. The 5th Special Forces Group quickly formed the counter-terrorism unit Blue Light to fill in until Delta was fully operational.

1st Special Forces Operational Detachment-Delta was then established on 17 November 1977, by Beckwith and Colonel Thomas M. Henry, as a counterterrorism unit based on the model of the British Special Air Service, but with a greater focus on hostage rescue in addition to covert operations and specialized reconnaissance.

Beckwith led Delta Force's first mission, Operation Eagle Claw, the assault on the captured American embassy in Tehran, Iran early in 1980. The mission was aborted due to helicopter failures during a sandstorm and a subsequent crash which led to several deaths. After the 'debacle in the desert,' the 160th Special Operations Aviation Regiment was formed to provide aviation support to Delta Force and other special operations units. JSOC was also formed, directly based on Beckwith's recommendations during Senate investigations into the mission's failure.

== Personal life ==
Beckwith was married to Katherine Beckwith, and they had three daughters. One of his daughters, Constance "Connie" Howe, is a former United States Army Reserve major.

His granddaughter, United States Air Force Technical Sergeant Mary Howe (now Daniell), is an aerial gunner of 4th Special Operations Squadron and the daughter of Paul R. Howe.

A second daughter, Margaret, married Mike Kazmierski, a West Point graduate. She served as an army captain in the Judge Advocate Generals Corps (JAG). Her son Zackery Aaron Kazmierski graduated from West Point in 2017.

He was a technical advisor on the Discovery Channel's series World of Valor (1992–1993).

== Later life and death ==
Following his disappointment at the failure of the Iranian operation, Beckwith retired from the Army. He started a consulting firm and wrote a book about Delta Force. In 1994, he died at his home of natural causes.

Beckwith's remains are interred in the Fort Sam Houston National Cemetery, San Antonio, Texas.

== Awards and decorations ==
Beckwith's awards include:

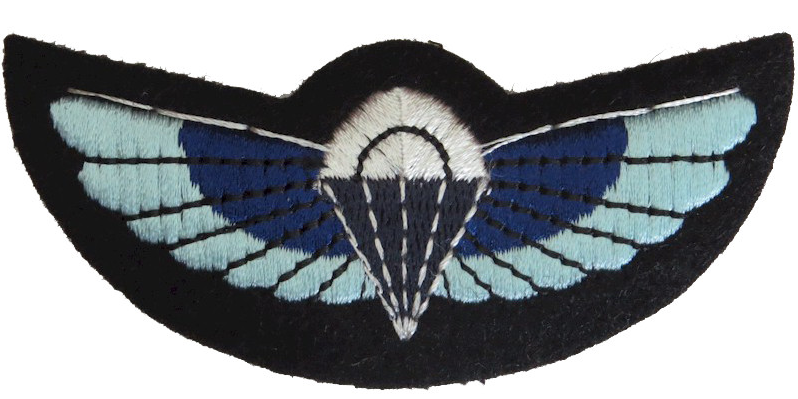

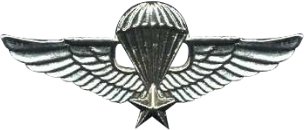

Badge	Combat Infantryman Badge with Star (denoting 2nd award)			
1st row	Silver Star with 1 Oak leaf cluster		Legion of Merit with 2 Oak leaf clusters	
2nd row	Distinguished Flying Cross	Bronze Star with "V" device and 3 Oak leaf clusters	Purple Heart	Meritorious Service Medal
3rd row	Air Medal with 2 Oak leaf clusters	Army Commendation Medal with 1 Oak leaf cluster	National Defense Service Medal with 1 Service star	Korean Service Medal with 2 Campaign stars
4th row	Armed Forces Expeditionary Medal with Arrowhead device and 3 Campaign stars	Vietnam Service Medal with 1 silver and 1 bronze Campaign stars	Army Service Ribbon	Vietnamese Gallantry Cross with palm
5th row	United Nations Korea Medal	Vietnam Armed Forces Honor Medal; First Class	Vietnam Campaign Medal	Korean War Service Medal
Badges	United Kingdom SAS Parachutist badge		South Vietnamese Parachutist badge	Master Parachutist Badge
Tabs	Special Forces Tab		Ranger Tab	
Unit awards	Presidential Unit Citation with 1 Oak leaf cluster		Valorous Unit Award	Meritorious Unit Commendation
Unit awards	Vietnam Presidential Unit Citation		Vietnam Gallantry Cross Unit Citation	Vietnam Civil Actions Medal Unit Citation

=== Other decorations ===
- Beckwith also earned 8 Overseas Service Bars, the Expert Infantryman Badge, the Special Forces Distinctive unit insignia, Combat Service Identification Badges from the 101st Airborne Division, 82nd Airborne Division, Army Special Forces, and Delta Force.

== See also ==
- Richard Meadows
- List of Delta Force members

== General and cited references ==
- Beckwith, Charlie A.; Knox, Donald; Mobley, C. A. (2000). Delta Force: The Army's Elite Counterterrorist Unit. New York: Avon Books. ISBN 978-0380809394.
