= Chloé Dumas =

Actress

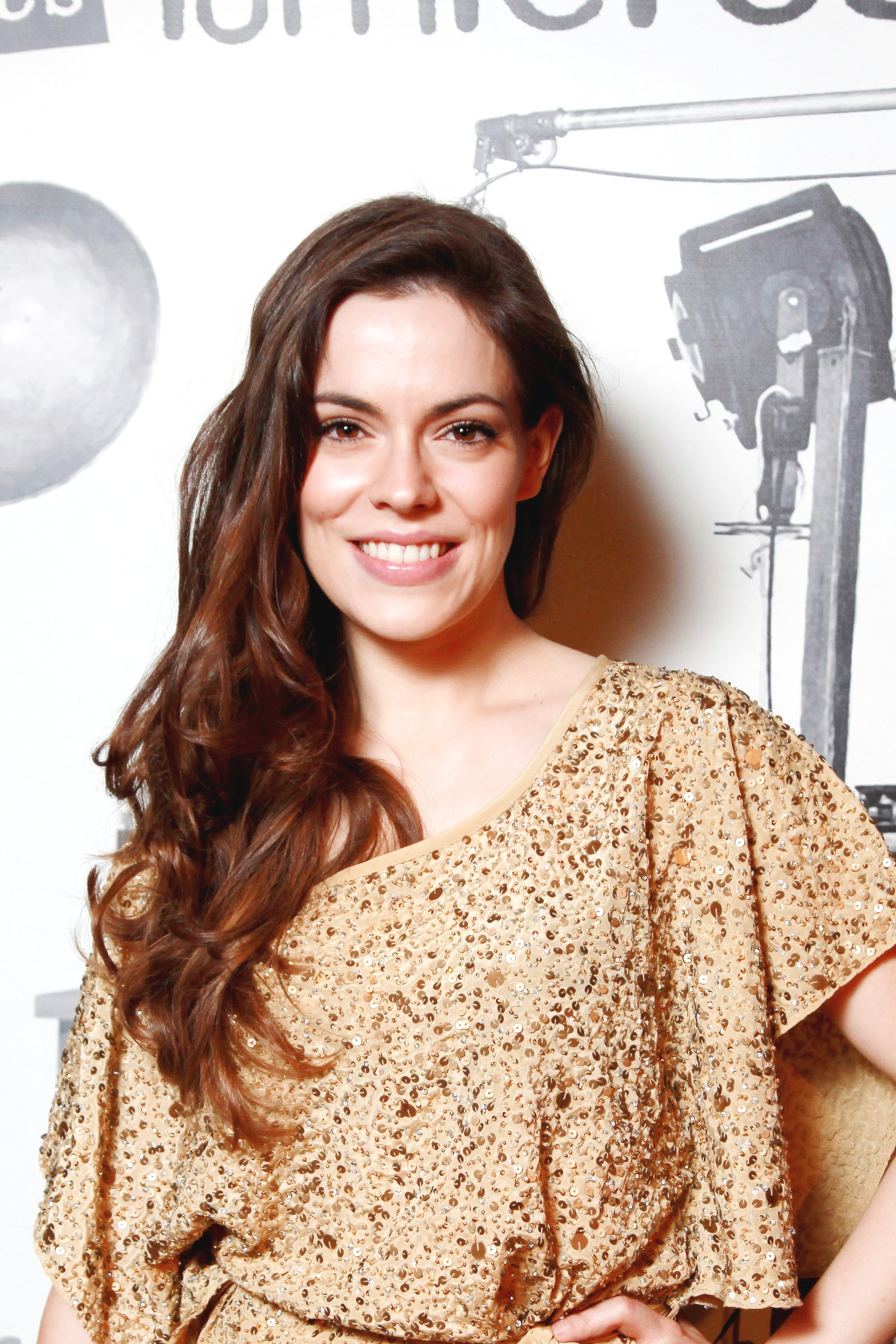
- Born: Toulouse, France
- Occupation: actress

Chloé Dumas is a trilingual English/French/Spanish actress born in Toulouse, France.

Her character in A Discovery of Witches was kept secret by Bad Wolf and author Deborah Harkness and was not revealed before the series was released on Sky One and Now TV.

Dumas leads in Kevin Mendiboure's The Follower. She also leads in Piece Demontee (2018) and Merci pour les cles(2018), two French comedy features. Involved in Uchronia (film), a movie by Christophe Goffette.

Dumas played the lead role in the feature Last Breath (2017), a psychologically damaged wife using violence against her husband. Her performance in the movie was praised and Last Breath won New York City Indie Film Awards (Best Feature Film, Best Directing, Best Acting, Best Editing), Los Angeles Cine Fest, and California Film Awards. She regularly plays in short movies with strong topics as Asperger syndrome (Je suis juste là), Alzheimer's disease (Les Pins Celestes), transgender (Frederique), poverty (El Inquilino), and child abuse (Leo et les bas).

She also is one of the principal performers in Dracula Reborn by Attila Luca, a feature movie distributed on DVD in the UK.

She leads with Bob Odenkirk and Jon Benjamin as Brigitte in the Comedy Central sketch comedy show Jon Benjamin Has a Van.

Dumas acts in Jean-Pierre Mocky's Tu es si jolie ce soir and appeared on American and European television in Bryan Buckley's W7 campaign.

She is Candi in Paris Connections, a mystery movie by the American director Harley Cokeliss, with Nicole Steinwedell, Anthony Delon, Anouk Aimée, and Charles Dance.

The launch of her comedy feature Merci pour les cles is scheduled for 2019.

== Films ==
Year	Film	Role	Notes
2018	Merci pour les cles!	Gwenaelle Dela	Feature movie by Romain Mogenet / principal performer
2018	Piece Demontee	Lucie Izarra	Feature movie by Rosalie Lemonnier / principal performer
2017	The Follower	Carol Anderson	Feature movie by Kevin Mendiboure / principal performer
2017	El Inquilino	Maria	Short movie by Sebastien Magnon / principal performer
2017	Uchronia	Hostess of First Agencies (with Delphine Chaneac and Zoe Felix)	Feature movie by Christophe Goffette / with Terry Gilliam, Robin Williams, Jan Kounen, Gabriella Wright, Elliott Murphy...
2017	Leo et les bas	The Mother	Short movie by Carole Gounot / principal performer
2016	Last Breath	Maëlle Louvet	Feature movie by Seyed Hosseini / principal performer
2016	Deadline	Gabrielle	Short movie by Mathilde Sereys de Rothschild / principal performer
2016	Frederique	Victor/Chloe	Short movie by Elodie Dupuis / principal performer
2016	Path of Dawn	Woman in Red	Short movie by Axel Zeltser / principal performer
2016	Fragile	Her	Short movie by Khalifa AlMarri / principal performer
2016	Mon Amour	Heroine	Short movie by François Nolla / principal performer
2016	Piece Demontee	Lucie Izarra	Feature movie by Rimbaud & Lemonnier / principal performer
2015	Dracula Reborn	Emmy McGreedy	Feature movie by Attila Luca / principal performer with Tina Balthazar and Yves Carlevaris
2015	Les Pins Celestes	Dr Lise Mageau	Short movie by Rémi K. Chevalier / principal performer with Marthe Villalonga
2015	Tu es si jolie ce soir	The victim	Feature movie by Jean-Pierre Mocky / with Delphine Chaneac
2015	Actors	Sarah	Short movie by Jonathan Bruzat / with Jonathan Bruzat
2015	8 minutes	Maud	Short movie by Jean Fantou / principal performer with Valentine Caille
2015	Heroine	The woman in love	Short movie by François Nolla / principal performer
2014	Je suis juste la	Sarah	Short movie by Jade Le Bloas / with Jonathan Bruzat
2014	Qui veut du quatre-quarts?	Chloe, the actress	Short movie by Leslie Villiaume / principal performer
2014	Les Infidèles	First part	Feature movie by Fred Cavayé / with Jean Dujardin and Gilles Lellouche
2014	Stalemate	Clara De Castel	Short movie by Lou Bausset / principal performer with Karine Lima
2013	Sous ma peau	Natacha	Short movie by Antoine Calmel / principal performer
2013	Endors-toi	Chloe	Short movie by Claire Hamon-Winding / principal performer with Charlotte Poutrel
2013	Day 0	Natacha	Short movie by Sylvain Berard / principal performer
2012	Dixit	Caroline	Short movie by Leslie Villiaume
2012	Jungle Bogey	Luna	Short movie by Tommy Gary
2012	Generation Y	The French girl	Short movie by Marc-André Abel
2011	Seul à Seul	Bimbo	Short movie by Nicolas Hugon and Bertrand Chanal / principal performer with Nicolas Couchet and Julien Ouguergouz
2011	Frangin, frangine	Lise	Short movie by Anthony Sonigo
2011	Zones d'Ombre	Ambre de Pibrac	Short movie by Salih Branki / principal performer with Constantin Balsan
2010	Paris Connections	Candi	Feature movie by Harley Cokeliss / with Nicole Steinwedell, Anthony Delon, Charles Dance and Anouk Aimée
2010	Fuck Sida	Florence Hallant	Short movie by Pierre Folliot / principal performer with Valérie Bernard and Françoise Levesque
2009	Gainsbourg (Vie héroïque)	Natalie Wood	Feature movie by Joann Sfar / with Eric Elmosnino, Lucy Gordon, Laetitia Casta and Doug Jones
2009	Agency	Julie	Short movie by Claudio Dinapoli

== Television ==
Year	Film	Role	Notes
2018	A Discovery of Witches	Meridiana	Directed by Sarah Walker (Sky One / Now TV)
2017	Nina	Samantha Alba	Directed by Eric Le Roux (France 2)
2016	Guru	Naila	with Yassine Azzouz, Jimmy Jean-Louis and Gary Dourdan
2016	L'Emission d'Antoine	The Model	Comedy show
2013	Marc Saint-Georges : the savior	Zoe	Directed by A. Fautré
2013	On ne demande qu'a en rire	The nurse	comedy show sketch by Anthony Joubert
2012	Secrets d'histoire	Juliette Drouet	Directed by D. Jankowsky (France 2)
2012	C'est la crise	The secretary	Directed by Anne Roumanoff
2012	Bande de Breles	principal performer	pilot by Antoine Calmel
2011	Resurrection	Adèle Bordier-Lancourt	Directed by Luc Chalifour (France 2) / with Nathalie Roussel and Arthur Molinier
2011	Jon Benjamin Has a Van	Brigitte	Directed by Leo Allen (USA : Comedy Central) / with H. Jon Benjamin and Bob Odenkirk
2010	W7	Julie	Directed by Bryan Buckley (Europe - USA)
2010	Joséphine, ange gardien	The nurse	Directed by Christophe Barbier - Season 13
2009	DRH	Lucie	Directed by Alban Taravello - Season 3
2009	Le juge est une femme	Marie	Directed by François Velle - Season 8
2009	Louis XV, Le Soleil Noir	La courtisane	Directed by Thierry Binisti (France 2)
2008	Décide-Toi Clément! ^{[3]}	Serena	Directed by Paul Paulsen - Season 1
2008	Nos Années Pension	Fanny	Directed by Alain Rudaz - Season 2
2007	MAD	Véronique	Directed by Cosme Peron (13ème rue) / with Julien Sitbon and Lucy Flamant

== Stage ==
Year	Category	Title	Artists
2008	Comedy	Un homme vite	Written by C. Zylberstein / Directed by M. Gendre
2006	Drama	Le Sang des Atrides	Written by Eschyle / Directed by M. Broutin
2006	Drama	Juste la Fin du Monde	Written by J.L. Lagarce / Directed by M. Broutin
2005	Drama	Ruy Blas	Written by V. Hugo / Directed by E. Sörensen
2005	Drama	Le Soulier de Satin	Written by P. Claudel / Directed by E. Sörensen
2003	Comedy	L'Ecole Buissonnière	Written by E. Labiche / Directed by L. Bernadou
2002	Comedy	La Chasse aux Jobards	Written by E. Labiche / Directed by L. Bernadou
2000	Drama	Phèdre	Written by J. Racine / Directed by J. Duchas
