= The Girl King =

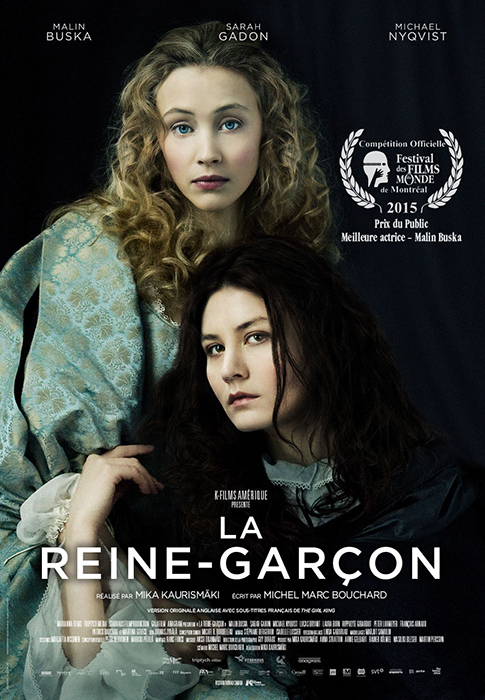
- Directed by: Mika Kaurismäki
- Written by: Michel Marc Bouchard
- Produced by: Arnie Gelbart; Mika Kaurismäki
- Starring: Malin Buska; Sarah Gadon; Michael Nyqvist; Lucas Bryant; Patrick Bauchau
- Cinematography: Guy Dufaux
- Edited by: Hans Funck
- Music by: Anssi Tikanmäki
- Production companies: Marianna Films; Triptych Media
- Release date: 4 September 2015 (MWFF)
- Running time: 106 min
- Countries: Finland; Canada; Sweden; Germany; France
- Languages: English; French; German

The Girl King is a 2015 biographical drama about Christina, Queen of Sweden. It was directed by Mika Kaurismäki and written by Michel Marc Bouchard who, after writing the screenplay for the film, wrote his stage play Christine, La Reine-Garçon which enjoyed a successful run in 2012 at Montreal's Théâtre du Nouveau Monde and then in English at the Stratford Festival in 2014. The film premiered at the Montreal World Film Festival.

== Cast ==
- Malin Buska as Kristina
- Sarah Gadon as Countess Ebba Sparre
- Michael Nyqvist as Chancellor Axel Oxenstierna
- Lucas Bryant as Count Johan Oxenstierna
- Laura Birn as Countess Erika Erksein
- Hippolyte Girardot as Ambassador Pierre Hector Chanut
- Peter Lohmeyer as Bishop Of Stockholm
- François Arnaud as Karl Gustav Kasimir
- Martina Gedeck as Maria Eleonora
- Patrick Bauchau as René Descartes

== Reception ==
=== Critical response ===
The film has received divided acclaim. At Rotten Tomatoes, the film has a rating of 42%, based on 19 reviews and an average rating of 4.81/10. Dana Piccoli at AfterEllen stated: "Anytime we get to see a story about queer women in history is a good thing, and The Girl King is certainly an interesting look at this enigmatic ruler. While I wish it could have been a bit stronger in its delivery, it's still a very watchable film."

=== Awards ===
The film won two awards at the Montreal World Film Festival, Best Actress to Malin Buska, and Most Popular Canadian Feature Film to director Mika Kaurismäki. It also won best Best Film at the Valladolid International Film Festival.

== Other ==
The Canadian Opera Company and Opéra de Montréal co-commissioned a French-language opera based on the same story with libretto by Bouchard and music by Julien Bilodeau, La Reine-Garçon, which premiered in Montreal on February 3, 2024.
