= Renaissance: The Blood and the Beauty =

- Starring: Charles Dance
- Country of origin: United Kingdom
- Original language: English
- No. of series: 1
- No. of episodes: 3

Production
- Running time: 58 minutes

Original release
- Network: BBC Two
- Release: 2 December – 16 December 2024

Renaissance: The Blood and the Beauty is a three-part BBC docu-drama series starring Charles Dance as Michelangelo Buonarroti.

== Premise ==
The series looks at the atmosphere of power politics and rivalry within which some of the greatest works of art of Michelangelo, Leonardo da Vinci and Raphael were created.

== Cast ==
- Charles Dance as Michelangelo Buonarroti
  - Eddie Mann as young Michelangelo
- Jonny Glynn as Leonardo da Vinci
- Joshua Duffy as Raphael
- Sophie Okonedo as the narrator
- Laurent Winkler as Pope Julius II
- Barnabás Réti as Ludovico Sforza
- Károly Hajduk as Girolamo Savonarola
- Ferenc Pataki as Lorenzo de' Medici

== Production ==
The three-part series is made by the BBC in collaboration with US network PBS. The series features actor Charles Dance as the artist Michelangelo. The script uses language taken directly from Michelangelo’s correspondence. Dance's part in the series was filmed in Islington, London. The series has contributions from contemporary artists such as Antony Gormley, Alison Lapper, and David LaChapelle as well as other experts.

Sophie Okonedo narrates the series, which features Eddie Mann as young Michelangelo, Jonny Glynn as Leonardo da Vinci, Joshua Duffy as Raphael with Laurent Winkler as Pope Julius II, Barnabás Réti as Ludovico Sforza, Károly Hajduk as Girolamo Savonarola and Ferenc Pataki as Lorenzo de' Medici.

In October 2024, the series was acquired by Movistar+ in Spain.

== Broadcast ==
The series premiered in the United Kingdom on 2 December 2024 on BBC Two.

== Reception ==
In The Guardian Hollie Richardson called it a "classy documentary drama series". Anita Singh in The Daily Telegraph praised the performance of Dance as Michelangelo, describing him as "great, bringing all the gravitas and wisdom you would expect", but questioned the decision not to have speaking parts for the actors portraying Leonardo da Vinci or Raphael. Dan Einav in The Financial Times favoured the documentary aspect of the series mentioning that some viewers will enjoy being "eruditely guided through some of the world’s most extraordinary paintings and sculptures by a line-up of art historians, biographers and artists".
