= A Discovery of Witches (TV series) =

2018 British fantasy television series

- Title card from the second series
- Genre: Fantasy; Romance; Drama
- Based on: All Souls Trilogy by Deborah Harkness
- Starring: Matthew Goode; Teresa Palmer; Edward Bluemel; Louise Brealey; Malin Buska; Aiysha Hart; Owen Teale; Alex Kingston; Valarie Pettiford; Gregg Chillin; Elarica Johnson; Greg McHugh; Trevor Eve; Daniel Ezra; Aisling Loftus; Tanya Moodie; Sorcha Cusack; Trystan Gravelle; Lindsay Duncan; Holly Aird; Tom Hughes; Michael Lindall; Sheila Hancock; Paul Rhys; Steven Cree; Adelle Leonce; Elaine Cassidy; James Purefoy; Michael Jibson; Olivier Huband; Ivanno Jeremiah; Peter McDonald; Toby Regbo; Parker Sawyers
- Composer: Rob Lane
- Country of origin: United Kingdom
- Original language: English
- No. of series: 3
- No. of episodes: 25

Production
- Executive producers: Lachlan MacKinnon; Jane Tranter; Julie Gardner; Kate Brooke; Deborah Harkness; Farren Blackburn; Ryan Rasmussen; Susie Conklin; Pete McTighe; Lisa Holdsworth; Helen Raynor
- Producers: Radford Neville; Dominic Barlow; Edoardo Ferretti
- Production locations: United Kingdom; Italy
- Cinematography: Suzie Lavelle; Christophe Nuyens; Petra Korner; Adam Etherington; Rasmus Arrildt; Garry Philips; Chas Bain; Catherine Goldschmidt
- Editors: Nick Arthurs; Philip Kloss; Nikki McChristie; Sam Williams; Phil Hookway; Mark Davies; Paul Knight; Joshua Cunliffe; Miikka Leskinen; Jo Smyth
- Running time: 45 minutes
- Production companies: Bad Wolf; Sky UK; Sky Studios (s. 2–3)

Original release
- Network: Sky One (s. 1–2); Sky Max (s. 3)
- Release: 14 September 2018 – 7 January 2022 (Note: The second and third series were both initially released in their entirety upon their respective premiere.)

A Discovery of Witches is a British fantasy television series based on the All Souls Trilogy by Deborah Harkness and titled after the first book in the trilogy. Produced by Bad Wolf and Sky Studios, it stars Matthew Goode and Teresa Palmer as a vampire and a witch who must learn about and fend off magical creatures. Edward Bluemel, Louise Brealey, Malin Buska, Aiysha Hart, Owen Teale, Alex Kingston, and Valarie Pettiford are also featured in main roles.

The eight-episode first series of A Discovery of Witches premiered weekly in the United Kingdom on Sky One from 14 September 2018. In November 2018, Sky One renewed A Discovery of Witches for a second and third series. The ten-episode second series was initially released in its entirety on 8 January 2021 and aired weekly on Sky One. The seven-episode third and final series was also initially released in its entirety on 7 January 2022 and aired weekly on Sky Max, following the shutdown of Sky One.

== Premise ==
Diana Bishop, a historian and reluctant witch, unexpectedly discovers a bewitched manuscript in Oxford's Bodleian Library. This discovery forces her back into the world of magic in order to unravel the secrets it holds about magical beings. She is offered help by a mysterious biochemist and vampire Matthew Clairmont. Despite a long-held mistrust between witches and vampires, they form an alliance and set out to protect the book and solve the mysteries hidden within while dodging threats from the creature world.

== Cast and characters ==
=== Main ===
- Matthew Goode as Matthew Clairmont, a vampire and Professor of Biochemistry
- Teresa Palmer as Diana Bishop, DPhil, a witch. Her biological parents are deceased but when living they were very powerful witches. She is a tenured historian at Yale University, studying alchemy and science at the University of Oxford
- Edward Bluemel as Marcus Whitmore, Matthew Clairmont's vampire son and lab colleague
- Louise Brealey as Gillian Chamberlain (series 1), a fellow witch and academic alongside Diana at Oxford
- Malin Buska as Satu Järvinen, a Finnish witch and a Congregation member
- Aiysha Hart as Miriam Shephard, vampire and Matthew's scientific colleague at Oxford
- Owen Teale as Peter Knox, a high-ranking witch and a member of the Congregation
- Alex Kingston as Sarah Bishop, Diana's aunt
- Valarie Pettiford as Emily Mather, Sarah's partner
- Gregg Chillin (Note: Credited as Gregg Chilingirian in series 3.) as Domenico Michele, a vampire and Congregation member
- Elarica Johnson as Juliette Durand (series 1), a vampire, daughter of Gerbert. Gerbert created her to be a love object to Matthew, causing her to obsess over him.
- Greg McHugh as Hamish Osborne, a daemon and Matthew's best friend
- Trevor Eve as Gerbert d'Aurillac, an ancient vampire and a Congregation member
- Daniel Ezra as Nathaniel Wilson, a daemon, son of Agatha
- Aisling Loftus as Sophie Wilson, a daemon, wife of Nathaniel, and as Susanna Norman (season 2), a witch
- Tanya Moodie as Agatha Wilson, a daemon and Congregation member
- Sorcha Cusack as Marthe, a vampire, the housekeeper at Sept Tours and companion to Ysabeau
- Trystan Gravelle (series 1–2) and Peter McDonald (series 3) as Baldwin Montclair, a vampire, brother of Matthew and head of the Congregation.
- Lindsay Duncan as Ysabeau de Clermont, mother of Matthew Clairmont and wife of Philippe de Clermont
- Holly Aird as Françoise (series 2), a vampire
- Tom Hughes as Kit Marlowe (series 2), playwright and friend of Matthew
- Michael Lindall as Walter Raleigh (series 2)
- Sheila Hancock as Goody Alsop (series 2), a witch
- Paul Rhys as Andrew Hubbard (series 2–3), a vampire
- Steven Cree as Gallowglass (series 2–3), son of the late Hugh de Clermont and nephew of Matthew
- Adelle Leonce as Phoebe Taylor (series 2–3), a human who becomes involved with Marcus
- Elaine Cassidy as Louisa de Clermont (series 2), sister of Matthew
- James Purefoy as Philippe de Clermont (series 2), husband of Ysabeau, father of Baldwin and stepfather of Matthew
- Michael Jibson as Rudolf II (series 2), Holy Roman Emperor and King of Bohemia
- Olivier Huband as Fernando Gonçalves (series 3), a vampire, partner of the late Hugh de Clermont
- Jacob Ifan as Benjamin Fuchs (series 3, guest series 2), a vampire
- Ivanno Jeremiah as Christopher Roberts (series 3), friend of Diana
- Toby Regbo as Jack Blackfriars (series 3)
  - Joshua Pickering as young Jack Blackfriars (recurring series 2)
- Parker Sawyers as Ransome Fayrweather (series 3), a vampire

=== Recurring and guest ===
- Adetomiwa Edun as Sean (series 1), an employee at the Bodleian Library
- Sophia Myles as Rebecca Bishop (series 1–2), Diana's mother
- David Newman as Stephen Proctor (series 1, guest series 2), Diana's father
- Chloe Dumas as Meridiana (series 1), a decapitated witch in thrall to Gerbert d'Aurillac.
- Milo Twomey as Pierre (series 2), a vampire
- Barbara Marten as Elizabeth I (series 2), Queen of England
- Adrian Rawlins as William Cecil (series 2)
- Adam Sklar as Henry Percy (series 2)
- Amanda Hale as Mary Sidney (series 2)
- Struan Rodger as John Dee (series 2)
- Anton Lesser as Rabbi Loew (series 2)
- Lois Chimimba as Catherine Streeter (series 2), a witch
- Amy McAllister as Marjorie Cooper (series 2), a witch
- Victoria Yeates as Elizabeth Jackson (series 2), a witch
- Genesis Lynea as Geraldine Newcopse (series 3), a vampire
- Shobu Kapoor as Linda Crosby (series 3), a witch
- Phaldut Sharma as T.J. Weston (series 3), a daemon

== Episodes ==
Series	Episodes	Originally released			Avg UK viewers (millions)
Series	Episodes	First released	Last released	Network	Avg UK viewers (millions)
1	8	14 September 2018	2 November 2018	Sky One	1.28
2	10	8 January 2021	12 March 2021	Sky One	0.344
3	7	7 January 2022	18 February 2022	Sky Max	TBA

=== Series 1 (2018) ===
No. overall	Episode	Directed by	Written by	Original release date	UK viewers (millions)
1	Episode 1	Juan Carlos Medina	Kate Brooke	14 September 2018	1.26
Diana Bishop is a witch who has rejected her magical heritage. She was raised by her aunts Sarah and Emily after her parents were killed by humans who feared their powers. She is also an accomplished historian with tenure at Yale University, currently conducting research at Oxford. While studying in the Bodleian Library, she summons the long-missing manuscript Ashmole 782, thought to contain information on the origin of supernatural species, thus catching the attention of witches, vampires and daemons alike. Biochemist Matthew Clairmont, a vampire, is drawn to her initially because of the book, but their repeated encounters spark something in both of them.
2	Episode 2	Juan Carlos Medina	Kate Brooke	21 September 2018	1.64
Matthew leaves Oxford for a few days hunting with a daemon friend, Hamish. Diana is approached by Peter Knox, a witch and Congregation member, who is also interested in Ashmole 782 and is even more persistent than Matthew. Satu, a Finnish witch allied with Knox, stalks Diana and threatens her. Even Diana's friend Gillian betrays her to Knox. With no one else to turn to, she seeks help from Matthew. He introduces her to his vampire colleagues Marcus and Miriam and reveals their DNA research into why the three supernatural species are in decline: vampires are failing to sire, witches are much less powerful than their ancestors and daemons are increasingly prone to mental illness.
3	Episode 3	Alice Troughton	Kate Brooke	28 September 2018	1.42
As creatures continue to flock to the Bodleian Library in the hope the Ashmole 782 will reveal itself again, Matthew distracts Diana with a trip to his home. He confirms his theory she uses magic instinctively, not consciously. A young daemon couple, Nathaniel and Sophie, are attempting to reach out to others of their kind online. Nathaniel's mother Agatha, a Congregation member, cautions them against pushing for radical change. Diana invites Matthew to dinner but unwittingly drives him away. The next day she receives photos from the scene of her parents' murder, a threat from Knox. She goes to confront him and his witch allies at the Bodleian, summoning witch wind, a powerful elemental force she can't control. Matthew comes to her aid and decides to take her away from Oxford to his family home in France.
4	Episode 4	Alice Troughton	Kate Brooke & Tom Farrelly	5 October 2018	1.15
Matthew and Diana arrive at Sept-Tours to a frosty welcome. Matthew's mother, Ysabeau, despises witches for their involvement in her husband's death during World War II. The Congregation holds an emergency meeting where Knox accuses Matthew of kidnapping Diana. Baldwin, vampire leader and Matthew's brother, is caught by surprise and calls Marcus, now revealed to be Matthew's son. Marcus tells him about Diana's summoning of Ashmole 782, which creatures know as Book of Life. Matthew reviews the photos sent to Diana and realizes they were staged, and her parents were killed by other witches. Vampire Domenico arrives at Sept-Tours with an official warning from the Congregation. Seeing Matthew and Diana together, he accuses them of breaking the Covenant, which prohibits inter-species relationships. Diana tells Matthew she loves him, but he pushes her away. He departs for Oxford after learning of a break-in at his lab. Diana's tears bring forth witch water, another powerful and rare ability.
5	Episode 5	Alice Troughton	Charlene James	12 October 2018	1.19
Matthew investigates the lab break-in and recognizes the intruder's scent. He confronts Gillian and drinks her blood, gaining access to her memories. Ysabeau takes Diana hunting to show her what vampires must do to survive, hoping to discourage her from pursuing Matthew. She also reveals as a human, Matthew had a wife and young son, who died from disease. Matthew picks up his research and compares Diana's DNA to that of ancient witches, making a surprising discovery. He rushes back to Sept-Tours and declares his love to Diana. He expects his mother's rejection, but Ysabeau calls Diana her daughter and vows to take up their fight. Matthew shows Diana the DNA results: she expresses every genetic marker they have discovered in witches. That night, they share a bed for the first time. Diana wakes up early and goes running, only to be grabbed from the air by an unseen person.
6	Episode 6	Sarah Walker	Charlene James	19 October 2018	1.06
Diana's captor is Satu. She is working with Gerbert, a vampire and Congregation member who wants access to Diana for his own purposes. Matthew discovers Diana is missing just as Baldwin arrives, demanding Matthew turn her over. Satu's torturing of Diana unexpectedly backfires and she loses her powers. She drops Diana into a pit. Gerbert shows Satu the witch whose head he keeps in a box, threatening her with the same fate if she crosses him, then leaves hastily as a helicopter approaches. Satu borrows power from the witch, Meridiana, and later releases her. Matthew and Baldwin arrive and find the pit. Diana has been vividly remembering a story her mother told her, which tells her how to escape. Hearing Matthew's voice, she summons her powers to raise herself out of the well. As she recovers at Sept-Tours, Baldwin prepares to take her to the Congregation, but Matthew invokes his deeper loyalty to the Knights of Lazarus. The way Diana's powers are being released convinces Matthew and Ysabeau she had been spellbound.
7	Episode 7	Sarah Walker	Sarah Dollard	26 October 2018	1.29
Matthew and Diana travel to Diana's childhood home in upstate New York. It reacts to their presence and Diana explains it is haunted. Baldwin stalls the Congregation, implying Satu still has Diana and questioning Gerbert's absence. Diana confronts her aunts about being spellbound. Sarah is shocked, but Emily admits she knew and kept it secret. It was Diana's parents, Rebecca and Stephen, who hid her powers to protect her from the Congregation. Sarah tries to teach Diana to control her magic. Emily reveals Stephen was a time-walker, a talent Diana soon begins to manifest as well. In London, Agatha Wilson tells Hamish about Nathaniel and Sophie and their possible connection to Diana. Marcus and Miriam show up at the Bishop house, prompting it to deliver an envelope from Stephen containing one of the missing pages from Ashmole 782. Diana is testing her magical ability to sense Matthew when she is suddenly confronted by the vampire Juliette, Matthew's former lover.
8	Episode 8	Sarah Walker	Kate Brooke	2 November 2018	1.21
Juliette attacks Matthew and mortally wounds him. Diana kills her with a bolt of witch fire. As Matthew lies dying, Diana calls on the Goddess and makes a bargain to save him. She cuts open her wrist with a ritual knife and lets Matthew feed from her arm, then her neck. Marcus saves her life with a blood transfusion. Matthew suggests he and Diana time-walk, to hide from the Congregation until Diana can master her powers. She needs three objects from the time and place they wish to go. Hamish fetches some items from Sept-Tours and brings them to the Bishop house, along with Sophie and Nathaniel. Sophie gives Diana her family heirloom: a statue of the goddess Diana, which is actually a chess piece once belonged to Matthew. The Congregation meets to decide Satu's fate. Gerbert has persuadeded Knox to turn against Baldwin. They force a vote; Baldwin wins it but can no longer protect his brother. Matthew transfers leadership of the Knights of Lazarus to Marcus and arranges for Ysabeau to shelter the others. Diana and Matthew prepare to time-walk, just as their enemies close in.

=== Series 2 (2021) ===
No. overall	Episode	Directed by	Written by	Original release date	UK viewers (millions)
9	Episode 1	Farren Blackburn	Sarah Dollard	8 January 2021	0.951
Diana and Matthew arrive in London on All Hallows' Eve, 1590, slightly off course from where they planned. They enter Matthew's London home and are confronted by Kit Marlowe, who instantly distrusts Diana, recognizing she is a witch. Diana realizes in turn Kit is a daemon. Matthew introduces Diana as his wife. His identity in this time period is Matthew Roydon, a member of the School of Night. Diana soon discovers he is also a spy for the English crown, reporting to William Cecil. Diana encounters a witch who looks like Sophie and realizes this must be her ancestor. However, the witch refuses to teach Diana, fearing both her unpredictable powers and Matthew's reputation. When Jack, a street urchin, attempts to steal Diana's purse, she stops Matthew from scaring him off and brings the boy home instead. She questions Jack about rumors he might have heard, and he tells her they originated from a local tavern frequented by Kit. Diana and Matthew reveal their secret to Kit, but Matthew warns him against another betrayal.
10	Episode 2	Philippa Langdale	Susie Conklin	15 January 2021	0.502
Matthew's loyalties are tested when he is ordered by Cecil to interrogate a witch, Thomas Caldwell. This puts Matthew in conflict with Andrew Hubbard, a vampire who rules over all of London's creatures and has an uneasy truce with the de Clermonts. Matthew also attempts to mend his relationship with Kit, indulging in a belated celebration of All Souls' Day. Diana finds the witch Susanna Norman again and persuades her to come to the house while Matthew is out. Susanna agrees to introduce her to England's most powerful witch, Goody Alsop. Goody identifies Diana as a weaver, a very rare kind of witch, and determines her father was one too. She also tells Diana her arrival was prophesied. Goody seeks approval from the witches' council to teach Diana. With witch trials underway in Scotland, the council is concerned about exposure, but Diana's honesty wins them over. After Matthew kills Caldwell to save him further torture, Hubbard sends a message to Philippe.
11	Episode 3	Philippa Langdale	Polly Buckle	22 January 2021	0.495
Matthew seeks forgiveness from Hubbard, who seems placated for now. Cecil, however, is losing trust in him. Diana trains in weaver magic with Goody Alsop and performs alchemical experiments with her new friend Mary Sidney. Knowing Diana seeks a rare alchemical text, Mary recommends she visit John Dee, a scholar who possesses the largest library in England. Diana discovers the Book of Life may have been in Dee's hands recently, but it was stolen by his former scribe, Edward Kelley. Cecil finds out about Diana and orders Matthew to bring her before Queen Elizabeth. Matthew blames Kit for this, despite his protestations, and orders him to stay away. The Queen believes Kelley, now in the hands of King Rudolf of Bohemia, knows the secret of immortality, and she tasks Matthew with bringing him back to England. However, Matthew's nephew Gallowglass soon arrives with a summons from Philippe. Not only must they interrupt Diana's training and their search for the Book of Life, but they must also leave behind Jack, who has become very dear to them.
12	Episode 4	Farren Blackburn	Pete McTighe	29 January 2021	0.249
Domenico has been monitoring vampire killings in Oxford through a contact in the police force. These are uncontrolled feedings leave behind mutilated victims. Domenico and Gerbert believe this is a sign of blood rage, a disorder linked to the de Clermont family. Marcus seeks out an auction which includes portraits of Matthew and Diana from Elizabethan times, meeting Phoebe Taylor in the process. The portraits are stolen during a break-in by the vampire Domenico has been hunting. Marcus and Phoebe go on a date and spend the night together, but she becomes frustrated by his secrecy and refuses to believe him when he tells her the truth. At Sept-Tours, Sarah and Emily feel stifled by Ysabeau's over-protectiveness. Emily secretly uses higher magic in an attempt to contact Rebecca Bishop. After Gerbert makes veiled threats toward her family, Ysabeau summons Marcus and confesses Matthew kept a secret from him: the blood rage originated in her line. She and Marcus are asymptomatic carriers, but Matthew is fully afflicted.
13	Episode 5	Philippa Langdale	Lisa Holdsworth	5 February 2021	0.301
Louisa de Clermont visits London looking for her brother, but instead she finds Kit and joins him in drunken debauchery. Diana and Matthew arrive in France by boat and begin the long journey on horseback to Sept-Tours, while Gallowglass goes on ahead to Bohemia. Diana is physically exhausted by the trip and finds Matthew growing more distant the closer they get to his father. When they finally arrive, Philippe quickly deduces Diana is a time-walker and this version of his son is from the future. Furthermore, he can tell the couple have not yet had intercourse, and thus despite what Matthew has told Diana, they are not truly mated. Hurt and angry, Diana pushes Matthew away before he can begin to explain. Philippe urges his son to go hunting first thing in the morning. Andre Champier, a witch, arrives at Sept-Tours, claiming Diana summoned him. Philippe appears to believe this and allows them to meet, but Champier calls Diana a traitor and attempts to steal her memories. When Matthew rushes to her aid, Diana summons the sword from his belt and kills her tormentor.
14	Episode 6	Jonathan Teplitzky	Pete McTighe	12 February 2021	0.257
Seeing his wife's ring on Diana's finger, Philippe realizes Ysabeau would not have given it to another while he lived. He challenges his son to a sword fight, goading him into revealing how he will die, but Matthew will not relent, even when his blood rage is revealed to Diana. Matthew explains to Diana this is why he held back from mating. He also confesses he killed Philippe to end his suffering after he endured months of torture. Diana's strength and power finally become clear to Philippe. He blesses her, making her his blood-sworn daughter, and takes the couple to the goddess Diana's temple to ask for her protection. Finally, he arranges for Matthew and Diana to be married. In the present, Emily and Sarah detect magical vibrations in the library at Sept-Tours, where Philippe used to leave hidden messages for Ysabeau. After searching all night, she discovers his final letter, revealing Matthew and Diana are mated, Matthew is finally happy, and Philippe has accepted his fate.
15	Episode 7	Farren Blackburn	Joseph Wilde	19 February 2021	0.153
Arriving in Bohemia at Emperor Rudolf's hunting lodge, Matthew and Diana are reunited with Gallowglass and, unexpectedly, Jack. Rudolf knows Matthew's true identity and rejects his request to see Edward Kelley, claiming he is in Prague. However, he becomes fascinated with Diana. While Matthew searches for evidence of Kelley's presence, Diana meets a vampire named Benjamin Fuchs and the learned Rabbi Loew, who also knows about the Book of Life. Matthew's jealousy almost derails their quest entirely, but Diana is instinctively able to calm his blood rage. Diana ultimately reveals her magical abilities to Rudolf in order to gain access to Kelley. Her power brings forth the images which were missing from the Book in the future. Rudolf attempts to detain her, and in the resulting chaos Kelley is able to rip out three pages. Aided by Gallowglass, Matthew and Diana escape with the damaged Book. Matthew realizes as he holds it, the pages, the binding, and the inks themselves are made from the skin, hair, and blood of creatures. Kelley, still a prisoner, is approached by Benjamin, who kills the guard in what appears to be a blood rage.
16	Episode 8	Farren Blackburn	Pete McTighe	26 February 2021	0.181
Marcus approaches Phoebe with the emblem of the Knights of Lazarus and invites her to research the organization. Once Phoebe accepts the reality of vampires, she and Marcus resume their relationship. Knox has discovered Edward Kelley's connection to the Book of Life. He informs Gerbert one missing page was entrusted to each of the three supernatural species. Sophie gives birth to a girl, Margaret, who is determined to be a witch. Marcus visits the site of the Congregation and stands up to Baldwin, but he unwisely tells him about the witch born of daemons. Baldwin shares this information with Gerbert, who in turn tells Knox. Sarah finds out Emily continues to practice higher magic and is furious, but she ultimately asks to join in the next attempt to contact Rebecca. Agatha Wilson finds Knox in her granddaughter's hospital room, having put Nathaniel and Sophie to sleep. Knox warns her the time will come when the witches take Margaret away to raise among her own kind.
17	Episode 9	Jonathan Teplitzky	Michelle Gayle	5 March 2021	N/A (<0.152) (Note: Not reported in the weekly top 15 programmes for four-screen viewer ratings.)
Queen Elizabeth demands Matthew answer for his failure to retrieve Kelley. Before facing her, Matthew escorts Diana to Goody Alsop, who detects a positive change in Matthew and also in Diana: she is pregnant. Diana successfully completes the seventh knot and summons her familiar, a firedrake named Corra. The Queen detains Matthew while Cecil searches his house for the Book of Life. He is on the verge of leaving with it when Gallowglass obstructs him, allowing Jack to steal it back. Matthew earns the Queen's forgiveness by revealing the future to her. However, Kit lies to Diana informing her that the Queen has imprisoned Matthew and leads her to where Louisa is waiting to kill her. Diana defends herself by unleashing Corra. Matthew takes Kit and Louisa to the psychiatric hospital known as Bedlam, where his blood rage almost leads him to kill his sister. Diana once again calms him down and they find a new way to connect to each other.
18	Episode 10	Farren Blackburn	Susie Conklin & Pete McTighe	12 March 2021	0.197
Diana's father Stephen arrives in 1591 in search of the Book of Life, having received the missing page in his own time. He and Diana exchange valuable information and get a chance to say goodbye. Miriam and the Wilsons arrive at Sept-Tours, followed by Marcus and Phoebe. Matthew has found a place for Jack with his friend Henry Percy, but Diana secretly arranges for Andrew Hubbard to watch over the boy as well. Hubbard is later confronted by Benjamin, the vampire from Bohemia, who is revealed to be his sire. Diana completes most of her magical training and bids farewell to Goody and Susanna. Domenico tracks the Oxford killer to Matthew's home but is attacked before he can learn his identity. After recovering, he returns to his hotel in Oxford, where he is observed by Benjamin. Gerbert persuades Knox to infiltrate Sept-Tours. Knox finds the temple where Emily last performed her ritual and uses magic to lure her there. When she refuses to give him the page from the Book, he kills her, then puts Marcus to sleep, and flees. Diana and Matthew prepare to return to the present.

=== Series 3 (2022) ===
No. overall	Episode	Directed by	Written by	Original release date	UK viewers (millions)
19	Episode 1	Jamie Donoughue	Lisa Holdsworth	7 January 2022	0.716
Diana and Matthew return to present-day Sept-Tours and are confronted with the tragic death of Emily. Matthew determines Diana is carrying twins. Agatha calls an emergency meeting of the Congregation regarding Peter Knox's actions at Sept-Tours. Upon hearing Knox killed Emily in cold blood and launched an unprovoked attack on de Clermont family land, the Congregation votes to expel him. Knox threatens Agatha before departing, prompting her to send Nathaniel and Sophie into hiding with Margaret. Baldwin visits Sept-Tours and recognizes Diana's status but demands all who are not members of the family leave. He also reveals Benjamin was sired by Matthew. At the suggestion of Gallowglass, Marcus proposes they form an independent branch of the family, called a scion, but Matthew rejects the idea. Diana and Matthew travel to London and leave Sarah in the care of Fernando, the mate of Matthew's late brother Hugh. Matthew and Miriam discuss the need for more DNA research. Diana takes them to meet her old friend Chris, revealing the existence of creatures to him and asking for his help. Domenico gives Baldwin the information he has gathered on the Oxford killer. In a Berlin hotel, Benjamin receives a call informing him Matthew and Diana have returned from the past.
20	Episode 2	Jamie Donoughue	Helen Raynor	14 January 2022	0.204
Father Hubbard tracks down Diana and Matthew and reunites them with Jack, now a young adult vampire. Hubbard sired Jack as he lay dying from plague, and thus he passed on the blood rage he carried from his own sire, Benjamin. When Baldwin comes to London, Jack feels threatened and attacks him, revealing not only his condition but the fact he is the Oxford killer. Baldwin orders Matthew to kill Jack, but Matthew's hesitation allows him to escape. Hubbard reveals Benjamin has been stoking Jack's rage, exploiting his desperation to find his family. Matthew locates Jack and brings him home to Diana. Defying Baldwin in this way leaves Matthew no choice but to seek independence. Chris and Miriam have made progress in their studies of vampire DNA, but to find a cure for blood rage they need more samples and additional resources. Matthew reluctantly agrees to let a group of student researchers join the project after signing a non-disclosure agreement. Matthew, Marcus, and Jack leave for New Orleans, home of Marcus' surviving vampire children, to obtain their DNA and seek their cooperation in forming a scion. Benjamin, now united with Gerbert, calls Matthew and sends him video evidence of Jack's crimes, demanding to meet with him and Diana.
21	Episode 3	Debs Paterson	Michelle Gayle	21 January 2022	0.207
After weeks in New Orleans, Marcus' attempts to win over his offspring have been unsuccessful. Jack continues to experience blood rage, while Matthew tries to help him learn control. Back in London, Phoebe and Diana have been tracing the history of all the books belonging to John Dee. They identify an occult text at the British Library which Diana uses her magic on, revealing one of the missing pages from the Book of Life is in Father Hubbard's possession. Peter Knox had already made a visit to Hubbard's office, resorting to his usual threats. Explaining what lies at stake for all creatures, Diana persuades Hubbard to trust her with the page. Sarah feels useless in the current fight and tries to sneak away. Gallowglass reveals to Sarah he has watched over Diana since birth, at Philippe's command, and convinces her Diana still needs her. Marcus manages to get an audience with Ransome, the head of his vampire brood, who will talk to Matthew only if he takes responsibility for what he did. Matthew recalls the name and face of every vampire he killed in New Orleans, including Ransome's mate, and apologizes sincerely to both Ransome and Marcus. Benjamin approaches Satu at the Congregation headquarters, hoping she will join him and Gerbert in the fight against Matthew and Diana, but Satu has her own plans.
22	Episode 4	Debs Paterson	Matt Evans	28 January 2022	0.220
With a lead on the third missing page, Diana crafts a locator spell that she and Sarah need assistance to cast. Diana visits the site where Goody Alsop's house once stood and meets the local coven who honors Goody's legacy. The spell leads Diana to the daemon Timothy Weston, a frightened recluse who considers the page part of his family and will not surrender it. Armed with additional DNA samples from the New Orleans vampires, Chris discovers the gene for blood rage is activated by something within the human genome, and thus depends on the genetic makeup of the individual being sired. Miriam brings the news to Matthew in person, convincing him even without a cure, he cannot let fear of failure keep him from returning home. Agatha accompanies Diana on a return visit to Timothy, promising the troubled daemon he will no longer be alone. Having secured the page, Diana goes into labor. Matthew requests Baldwin's permission to form a scion, but his brother refuses. Matthew then rushes back to London, joining Diana as she gives birth to a girl and a boy. Gallowglass, having confessed his love for Diana, realizes the time has come for him to leave. Agatha goes back to Timothy's house only to find him dying after an attack by Peter Knox.
23	Episode 5	Debs Paterson	Lisa Holdsworth	4 February 2022	0.136
Agatha and Diana attend Timothy's funeral. Ysabeau and Marthe arrange a celebration at Sept-Tours for the twins' christening. Diana discovers baby Rebecca needs blood instead of milk, while Jack and Matthew hear baby Philippe witch blood singing. Gerbert pressures Baldwin to bring the children before the Congregation so their nature can be determined. Baldwin disrupts the christening ceremony and attempts to subdue Matthew physically. Diana promises Baldwin any blood-raged vampire within the scion will learn to control it or be spellbound. Baldwin grudgingly gives his permission, but he reminds Matthew that Benjamin is now his responsibility. Benjamin has become obsessed with having his own child and is kidnapping and raping witches. He allows one to escape and make her way to Sept-Tours in order to lure Matthew into a confrontation. Among the witch's things, Matthew finds a watch engraved, "To Philippe 1922". Marcus wants to strengthen the Knights of Lazarus with more members who can protect each other if the Congregation comes for them. Diana and Matthew pledge on behalf of the twins, with Miriam, Jack, Sarah, and Chris joining the ranks as well. Matthew also welcomes Fernando into his scion.
24	Episode 6	Jamie Donoughue	Christopher Cornwell	11 February 2022	N/A
Matthew leaves to confront Benjamin, alone. Diana, Sarah, and Fernando go to Oxford, and Marcus instructs Fernando to bring Gallowglass back into the fold. Marcus gives Phoebe a chance to leave in case things go wrong, but she is determined to stay with him and become a vampire. Ashmole 782 appears again for Diana and she replaces the missing pages. The Book transforms itself; the pages become blank and the text now lives within Diana. Peter Knox confronts them at the airport, but Sarah uses a spell Diana crafted to kill him. Matthew finds Benjamin in Poland at the site where Philippe was tortured and learns he was directly involved. Matthew defeats Benjamin in a physical fight, but Satu intervenes and knocks Matthew unconscious. Gerbert reveals to Domenico he has conspired with Benjamin for centuries to slowly destroy the de Clermonts. Surprising even himself, Domenico shares this information with Baldwin. Diana writes furiously, pouring out information from the Book of Life that Miriam and Chris recognize as central to their genetic work. Marcus receives a video from Benjamin in which he directly addresses Diana, revealing Matthew is under his control and on the verge of death.
25	Episode 7	Jamie Donoughue	Helen Raynor	18 February 2022	N/A
Baldwin recognizes Philippe's watch on Benjamin's wrist in the video, making the connection to the place where his father was tortured. Diana departs for Poland with Baldwin, Miriam, Marcus, and Gallowglass. Confronted by illusions crafted by Satu, Diana sees through them and spellbinds her fellow weaver. She then advances on Benjamin, weaving the tenth and final knot to end his life. Matthew is too far gone to be helped by anyone's blood but Ysabeau's, so they transport him back to Sept-Tours, where he slowly recovers. Miriam and Chris have pieced together the genetic information Diana gained from the Book of Life and discovered the reason creatures are in decline is precisely that they have been segregated. Interbreeding is the key to their survival. Diana takes over as the de Clermont representative to the Congregation and convinces all but Gerbert to repeal the Covenant and elect Agatha as their new leader. Baldwin and Matthew reconcile, Fernando is officially recognized as Hugh's mate, Phoebe and Marcus get engaged, and Agatha is reunited with her family. Diana writes the twins' lineage into the Book of Life.

== Production ==
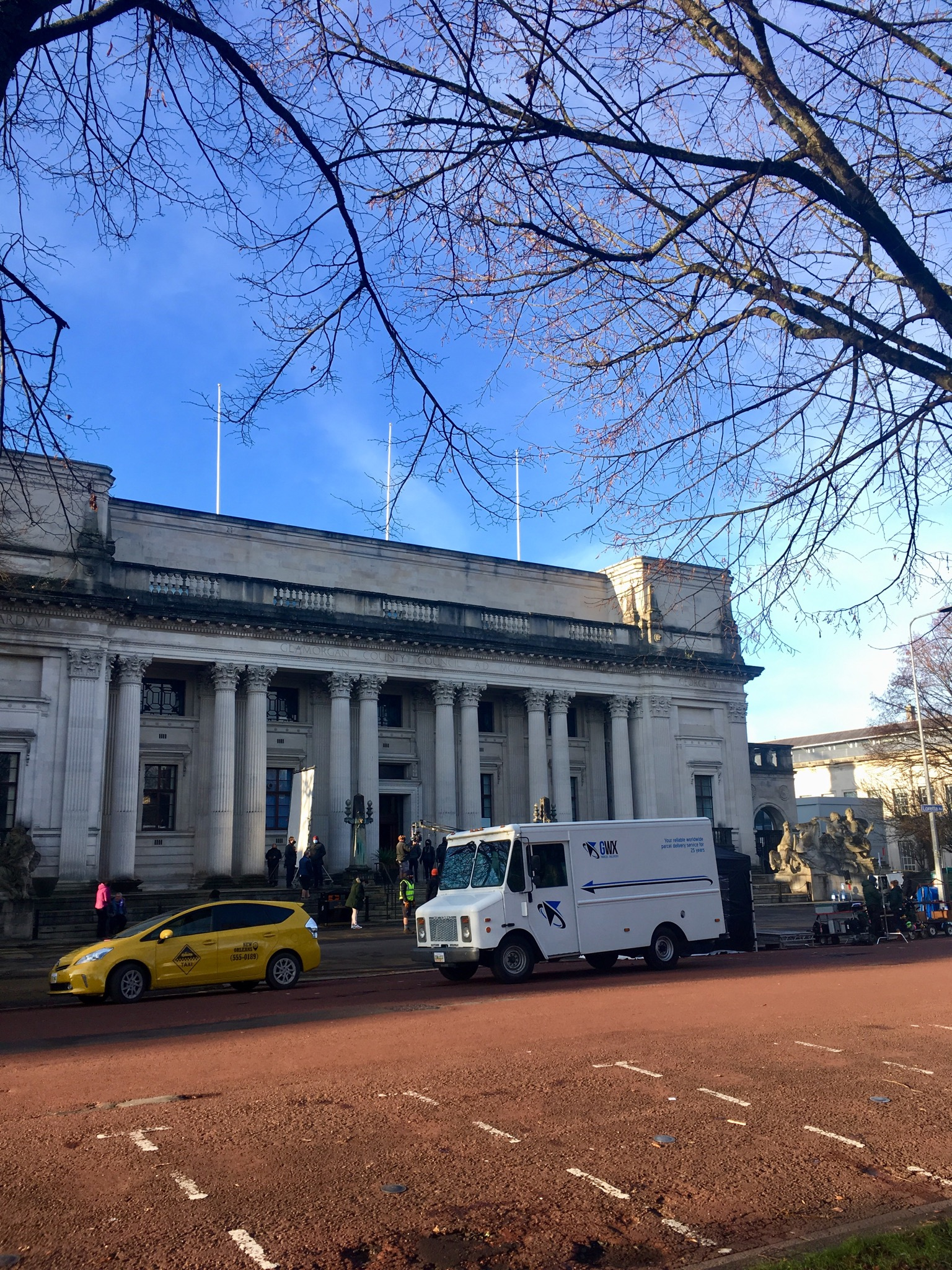
Filming of A Discovery of Witches in Cardiff in November 2020

Warner Bros. purchased the film rights to A Discovery of Witches in 2011. The film was in the early stages of development, with few details released beyond the signing-on of playwright David Auburn to pen the screenplay and producers Denise Di Novi and Allison Greenspan.

British entertainment channel Sky One bought the rights for the books, to adapt them into a television programme. Teresa Palmer was cast as Diana Bishop and Matthew Goode was cast as Matthew Clairmont. After six months of filming, it was completed on 16 February 2018. Much of the work was filmed in Wales, on location and at Bad Wolf Studios in Cardiff.

On 2 November 2018, Sky One renewed A Discovery of Witches for a second and a third series before the first series finale was broadcast. A first look at the second series was released in September 2019. In December 2019, it was announced that the filming for the next series was completed in the UK, and the rest of the filming would take place in Italy. During the New York Comic Con's virtual event in October 2020, it was reported that the third series was filming at Wolf Studios in Cardiff. A trailer for the third series was released in October 2021.

== Release ==
The programme premiered in the UK on Sky One on 14 September 2018 with its first series of eight episodes. Streaming on NOW TV also started on that date after each episode was broadcast. The international distribution of the programme is handled by Sky Vision. From January 2019, the series became available on AMC's subscription services Sundance Now, Shudder, and AMC Premiere.

It was announced by AMC Networks at the TCA press tour that the show would be making its American television debut on 7 April 2019 on AMC and BBC America, being paired with Killing Eve's second season.

The second series was initially released in its entirety on 8 January 2021, consisting of ten episodes, and continued to air weekly on Sky One.

The third and final series was also initially released in its entirety on 7 January 2022 and aired weekly on Sky Max. The programme received generally positive reviews, with praise for the chemistry between the main characters, and it received a nomination for Best New Drama at the National Television Awards. The third series was released on SundanceNow, Shudder and AMC+ on 8 January 2022.

== Reception ==
=== Critical reception ===
The show received positive reviews from critics, who praised the adaptation, the production and the performances of the cast. On Rotten Tomatoes, 94% of 33 critics have given the first series a positive review, with an average rating of 7/10. The website's critical consensus reads, "A Discovery of Witches smartly grounds its flights of fancy with a lived-in authenticity and harnesses the chemistry between its two star-crossed leads to make for a promising foray into the occult." For the second series, Rotten Tomatoes collected 21 critic reviews and identified 81% of them as positive, and the average rating is 6.8/10. The consensus states, "Grounded by Matthew Goode and Teresa Palmer's infectious chemistry and a healthy dose of visual splendor, A Discovery of Witches' sophomore season makes slipping eras look easy." Metacritic gave the first series an average score of 67 out of 100 based on reviews from 11 critics, indicating "generally favorable reviews".

=== Accolades ===
In October 2018, A Discovery of Witches was nominated in the longlist for Best New Drama in the British National Television Awards. In January 2019, it was announced as a nominee for the shortlist of Best New Drama series nominees at the 24th National Television Awards.
