= Paris Connections =

- Directed by: Harley Cokeliss
- Screenplay by: Michael Tupy
- Story by: Jackie Collins
- Starring: Nicole Steinwedell; Anthony Delon
- Distributed by: Amber Entertainment; Alienor Productions
- Release date: 16 September 2010
- Running time: 90 minutes
- Country: United Kingdom
- Language: English

Paris Connections is a 2010 British film directed by Harley Cokeliss. The script was written by Michael Tupy, based on a thriller by Jackie Collins. The film was the first direct-to-DVD film produced by the British supermarket firm Tesco when trying to diversify its business.

== Plot ==
At the beginning of Paris fashion week, a beautiful young model is brutally murdered. Investigative journalist Madison Castelli, certain that it is more than the "crime of passion" the French press says, comes to Paris to follow her story.

== Cast ==
- Nicole Steinwedell as Madison Castelli
- Charles Dance as Aleksandr Borinski
- Anthony Delon as Jake Sica
- Hudson Leick as Coco De Ville
- Trudie Styler as Olivia Hayes
- Anouk Aimée as Agnès St. Clair
- Chloé Dumas as Candi
- Caroline Chikezie as Natalie
- Fabien De Chalvron as Sergei
