= Malin Buska =

Swedish actress (born 1984)

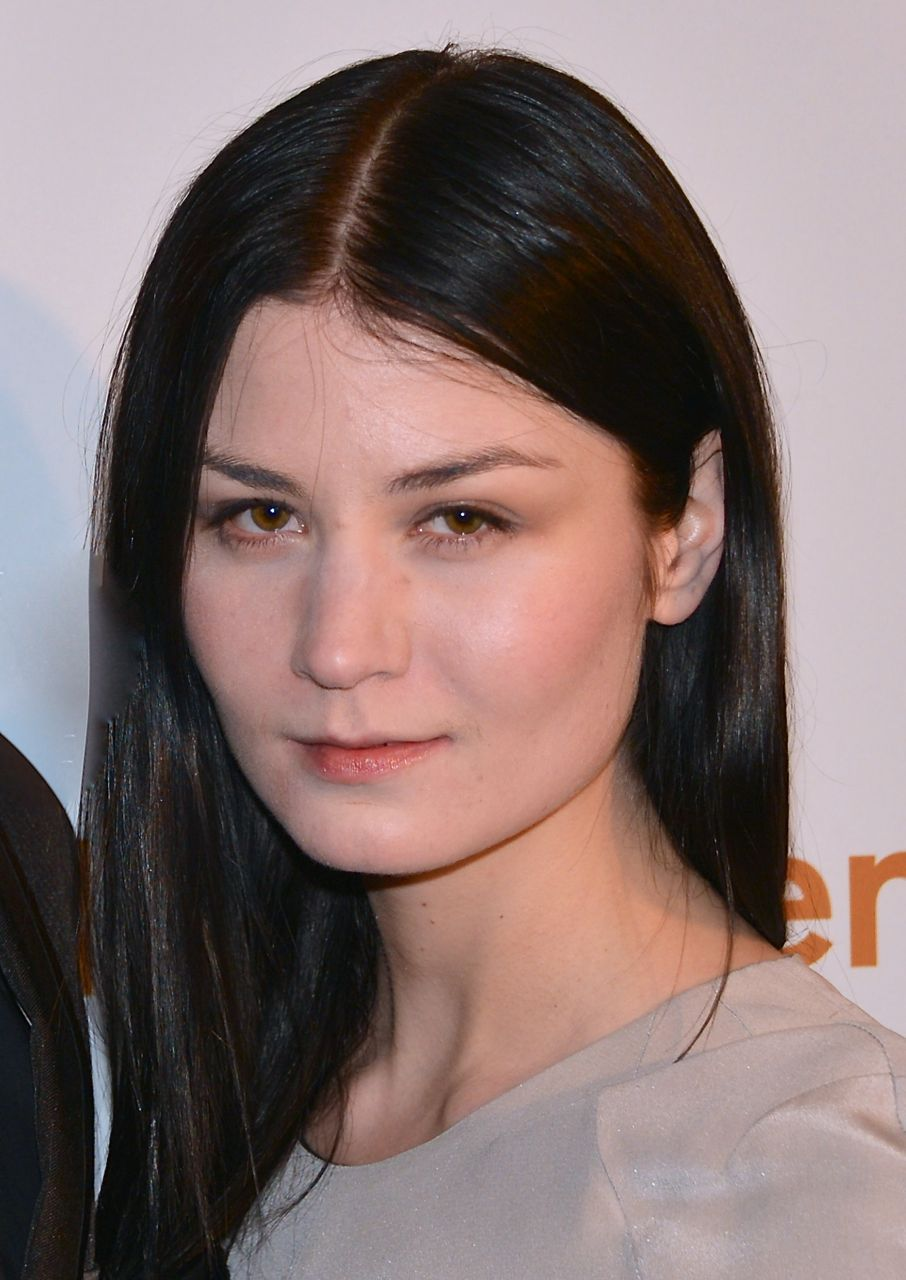
- Buska in 2013
- Born: Malin Kristina Buska; 15 March 1984 (age 41); Övertorneå, Sweden
- Occupation: Actress

Malin Kristina Buska (born 15 March 1984) is a Swedish actress. She was born and grew up in Övertorneå and studied in Luleå. She has acted at the Luleå Stadsteater and studied acting at Teaterhögskolan in Malmö between 2004 and 2007. She made her film debut in 2011 in the film Happy End. Buska also had a role in the film Easy Money III: Life Deluxe and the leading role in the 2015 film The Girl King, a biographical drama about Christina, Queen of Sweden. In 2018 Buska joined the cast of British TV series, A Discovery of Witches.

In 2011, she was awarded the Rising Star award at the Stockholm Film Festival. At the Elle-gala in 2015, she was announced as Best Dressed Woman of the Year. She co-starred with Alexander Karim in the Viaplay thriller series Advokaten (2018).
