= Nicole Steinwedell =

American actress

- Born: April 2, 1981 (age 45); Pensacola, Florida, U.S.
- Occupation: Actress
- Years active: 2003–2020

Nicole Steinwedell (born April 2, 1981) is a former American film and television actress turned banking executive.

She is the daughter of two Marines and the granddaughter of a U.S. Army colonel. She has three sisters and one brother. She is best known for playing Bridget "Red Cap" Sullivan in the CBS series The Unit and as Philomena "Philly" Rotchliffer in the A&E series Breakout Kings.

In 2019, Steinwedell staged a one-woman show that she wrote, "Temple Tantrum", about growing up in a Christian cult.

Steinwedell last acted in film and television in 2020. In 2024, she was appointed Vice-President and banker by J.P. Morgan Private Bank in New York.

== Filmography ==
Film
Year	Title	Role	Notes
2006	Escape	S&M Blonde	Short film
2007	Crazy	Girl from Byrd's Room	
2009	He's Just Not That Into You	"No Spark" Girl	
2009	A Single Man	Doris	
2010	Paris Connections	Madison Castelli	
2011	Compulsion	Jane	Short film
2012	Chrysalis	Mikayla	
2013	The Golden Scallop	Sharon Jennings	
2013	Raze	Isabelle	
2015	Cats Dancing on Jupiter	Jillian	
2020	Wander	Tanya	

Television
Year	Title	Role	Notes
2003	Dawson's Creek	Kristy Livingstone	"Joey Potter and Capeside Redemption" (season 6: episode 22)
2003	Run of the House	Amy Carelli	"The Education of Chris Franklin" (season 1: episode 10)
2006	Modern Men	Katy	"Pilot" (season 1: episode 1)
2008–2009	The Unit	Warrant Officer One Bridget Sullivan	Main character; 17 episodes
2010	White Collar	Jessica Breslin	"Company Man" (season 2: episode 8)
2011	Breakout Kings	Philomena "Philly" Rotchliffer	"Pilot" (season 1: episode 1) "Collected" (season 1: episode 2)
2011	Franklin & Bash	Eileen Morrow	"You Can't Take It with You" (season 1: episode 5)
2011	The Glades	Frannie Henderson	"Second Skin" (season 2: episode 8)
2011	Two and a Half Men	Veronica Hastings	"Frodo's Headshots" (season 9: episode 9)
2013	CSI: Crime Scene Investigation	Samantha Wilson	"In Vino Veritas" (season 13: episode 13)
2013	Rizzoli & Isles	Taylor Franklin	"Killer in High Heels" (season 4: episode 4)
2013	NCIS	Olivia Chandler	"Alibi" (season 11: episode 8)
2014	Masters of Sex	Holly	"Asterion" (season 2: episode 7)
2015	NCIS: Los Angeles	Allison Nelson	"Defectors" (season 7: episode 9)
2017	Grimm	Adult Diana	"The End" (season 6: episode 13)
2017	Criminal Minds	Lori Ferell	"Lucky Strikes" (season 13: episode 6)
2018	Dynasty	Lady Monk	"Filthy Games" (season 2: episode 12)
2019	The Rookie	Alicia Kegel	"Homefront" (season 1: episode 18)
2020	Hawaii Five-0	Maureen Townsend	"Like A Whirlwind, Whirling the Dust Upward" (Season 10: Episode 17)
