= Charles Dance =

British actor (born 1946)

Charles Dance OBE
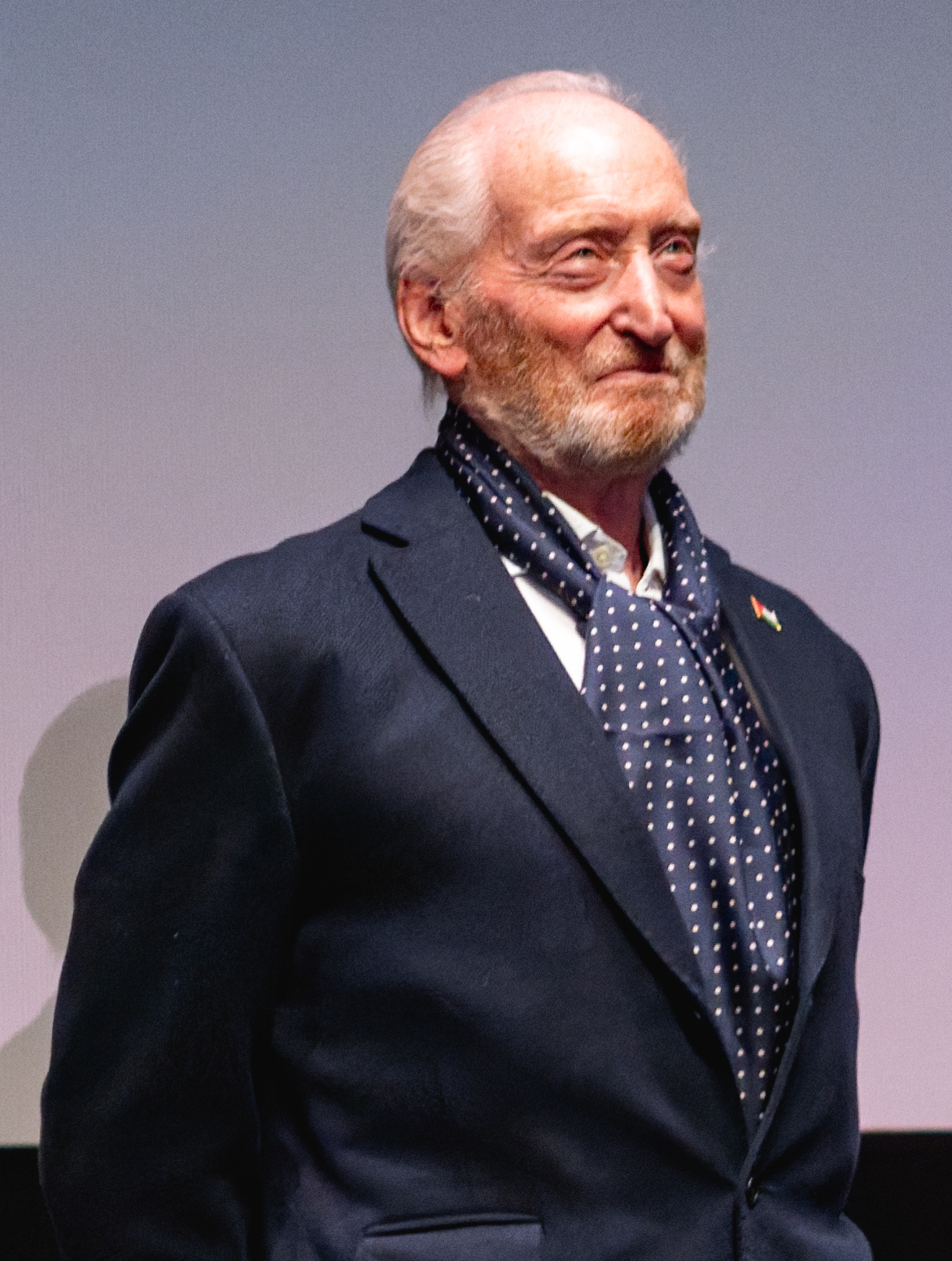
- Dance in 2025
- Born: Walter Charles Dance; 10 October 1946 (age 80); Redditch, Worcestershire, England
- Occupation: Actor
- Years active: 1971–present
- Spouse: Joanna Haythorn (m. 1970; div. 2004)
- Partners: Eleanor Boorman (2008–2014); Alessandra Masi (2018–present)
- Children: 3

Walter Charles Dance (born 10 October 1946) is an English actor. Known for playing intimidating authoritarian characters and villains, he is the recipient of two Actor Awards and a Critics' Choice Award in addition to four Primetime Emmy Award nominations. Dance started his career on stage with the Royal Shakespeare Company (RSC) before appearing in film and television. For his services to drama he was appointed an OBE by Queen Elizabeth II in 2006.

He made his feature film debut in the James Bond film For Your Eyes Only (1981). He has since acted in a string of critically acclaimed period films including Michael Collins (1996), Gosford Park (2001), The Imitation Game (2014), Mank (2020), and The King's Man (2021). He has also appeared in the films The Golden Child (1986), Alien 3 (1992), Last Action Hero (1993), Dracula Untold (2014), and Godzilla: King of the Monsters (2019). He made his directorial film debut with the drama film Ladies in Lavender (2004), which he also wrote and executive produced.

On television, Dance played Guy Perron in The Jewel in the Crown (1984), Mr Tulkinghorn in Bleak House (2005), for which he was nominated for a Primetime Emmy Award for Outstanding Lead Actor in a Limited Series or Movie, Tywin Lannister in Game of Thrones (2011–2015), and Lord Mountbatten in the third and fourth seasons of The Crown (2019–2020), for which he was nominated for a Primetime Emmy Award for Outstanding Guest Actor in a Drama Series.

== Early life ==
Walter Charles Dance was born on 10 October 1946 in Rednal, Worcestershire, the younger son of Eleanor Marion (née Perks; 1911–1984), a cook, and Walter Dance (1874–1949), an electrical engineer who served as a sergeant in the 2nd Regular Battalion of the Royal Fusiliers during the Second Boer War (having previously served in the 2nd Volunteer Battalion) and who was in his 70s when his son was born. By his father's previous marriage, Dance had two older half-sisters, Norah (1898–1993) and Mary (1903–1908). On his maternal side, he also has an elder half-brother, Michael (born 1936).

During filming of an episode for the genealogical series Who Do You Think You Are? in 2016, Dance discovered that his mother had Belgian ancestry, which traced back to the city of Spa. His immigrant ancestor Charles François Futvoye (1777–1847) had been a pioneer in the art of japanning during the early half of the 19th century. Growing up in Plymouth, Dance attended the now-defunct Widey Technical School for Boys (then known as Widey High School) in Crownhill. He later attended the Plymouth Drawing School (later renamed to Plymouth College of Art, and now known as Arts University Plymouth) and Leicester College of Arts (now known as De Montfort University), where he studied graphic design and photography.

== Career ==
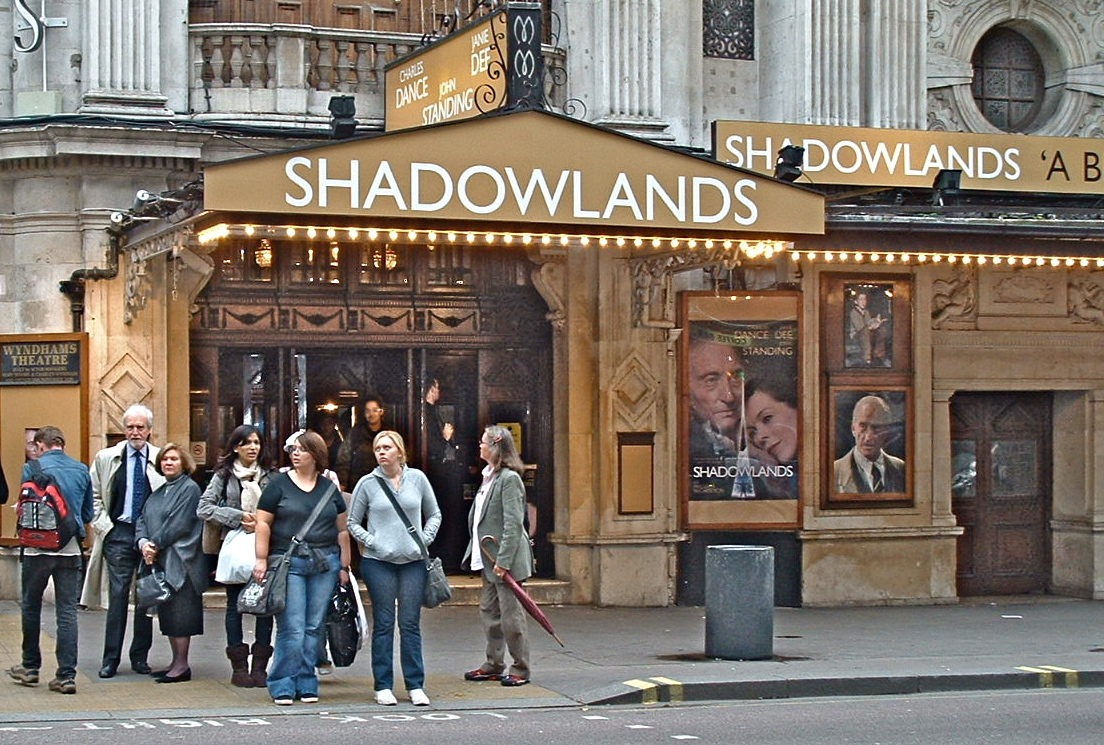
Shadowlands at the Wyndham's.

=== Royal Shakespeare Company (RSC) ===
Dance was a member of the Royal Shakespeare Company during the mid-to-late 1970s and was in many of their productions in London and Stratford-upon-Avon. Later he returned to the RSC to take the title role in Coriolanus at Stratford-upon-Avon and Newcastle in 1989, and at the Barbican Theatre in 1990. He received rave reviews and a Critics' Circle Best Actor award for his performance as C. S. Lewis in William Nicholson's Shadowlands, in the 2007 stage revival.

=== Television and film ===
Dance made his screen debut in 1974, in the ITV series Father Brown as Commandant Neil O'Brien in "The Secret Garden". Other small parts followed, including a 1983 cameo as a South African assassin in The Professionals, but his big break came the following year when he played Guy Perron in The Jewel in the Crown (Granada Television, Christopher Morahan 1984), an adaptation of Paul Scott's novels that also made stars of Geraldine James and Art Malik. Dance made one of his earliest big-screen appearances in the 1981 James Bond film For Your Eyes Only as evil henchman Claus. Though he turned down the opportunity to screen test for the James Bond role, in 1989 he played Bond creator Ian Fleming in Anglia Television's dramatised biography directed by Don Boyd, Goldeneye (the name of Fleming's estate in Jamaica and a title later used for a James Bond film).

He has also starred in many other British television dramas such as Edward the Seventh (as Prince Albert Victor, Duke of Clarence and Avondale, Edward VII's oldest son, and heir to the throne), Murder Rooms, Randall and Hopkirk, Rebecca, The Phantom of the Opera, Fingersmith and Bleak House (for which he received an Emmy nomination for Outstanding Lead Actor in a Miniseries or a Movie). He was name-checked in the British comedy series Absolutely Fabulous, as being slated to play the title character in The Life of Jesus Christ 2, which was filming in Morocco at the same time as the main characters of the series were there for a photo shoot. He also played Guy Spencer, the pro-Hitler propagandist, in the second instalment of Foyle's War, and had an ongoing role as Dr. Maltravers in the ITV drama Trinity.

Dance made a guest appearance on the BBC drama series Merlin as the Witchfinder Aredian, and as a vainglorious version of himself in the third series of Jam & Jerusalem. He played Lord Vetinari in the 2010 Sky adaptation of Terry Pratchett's Going Postal, and the Russian oligarch Aleksandr Borinski in Paris Connections. He played the role of Tywin Lannister in HBO's Game of Thrones, based on the A Song of Ice and Fire novels by George R. R. Martin. Dance was wooed for the role by the producers while filming Your Highness in Belfast. Dance also played Conrad Knox on the British television series Strike Back: Vengeance as the primary villain in the series.

Since 2012, Dance has had a recurring role in The Big Fat Quiz of the Year reading excerpts from books, such as Fifty Shades of Grey or the autobiographies of English media personalities, in a deadpan manner. On 30 June 2013, Dance appeared with other celebrities in an episode of the BBC's Top Gear as a "Star in a Reasonably Priced Car" for the debut of the Vauxhall Astra. In summer 2018, Dance narrated a documentary entitled Spitfire, which featured the legendary Supermarine Spitfire and recounted the efforts of the RAF pilots who flew them during the Second World War.

In February 2017, Dance participated as a featured guest at the inaugural Saudi Comic Con in Jeddah, Saudi Arabia, alongside fellow Game of Thrones actor Julian Glover.

In 2019 he played an antagonist in Godzilla: King of the Monsters and appeared as Lord Mountbatten in series 3 of The Crown in the same year. In 2020, Dance portrayed William Randolph Hearst in David Fincher's Mank, co-starring alongside Gary Oldman and Amanda Seyfried. In January 2021, Dance was cast in the Netflix adaptation of The Sandman.

In 2024 Dance starred as Michelangelo in the BBC docu-drama Renaissance: The Blood and the Beauty.

=== Screenwriting and directing ===
Dance's debut film as a screenwriter and director was Ladies in Lavender (2004), which starred Judi Dench and Maggie Smith. In 2009, he directed his own adaptation of Alice Thomas Ellis's The Inn at the Edge of the World.

== Personal life ==
Dance married Joanna Haythorn in 1970. They had a son born in 1974 and a daughter born in 1980 before divorcing in 2004. He later dated Eleanor Boorman from 2008 to 2014, and they had a daughter born in 2012. He is in a relationship with the Italian production manager and former actress Alessandra Masi, whom he met in Italy in 2018. As of 2018, Dance resides in Kentish Town, London.

== Political views ==
Dance has described his political views as "very left-of-centre" and "a bit left of centre-left". He supported the UK remaining in the European Union in the run-up to the 2016 EU referendum, and expressed his wish for the country to be closer to Europe to avoid "being a little satellite of America". In a 2020 interview with the Financial Times, he felt NHS workers were not being offered a decent enough pay rise and labelled Boris Johnson a "bumbling buffoon".

In October 2023, after the Gaza war began, Dance was one of over two thousand to sign an "Artists for Palestine" letter calling for a ceasefire and accusing western governments of "not only tolerating war crimes but aiding and abetting them." In January 2024, Dance contributed to a video published by the Palestine Festival of Literature in support of South Africa's legal motion accusing Israel of genocide at the International Court of Justice (ICJ). In September 2025, Dance signed an open pledge with Film Workers for Palestine pledging not to work with Israeli film institutions "that are implicated in genocide and apartheid against the Palestinian people." Later that month, in an interview with The Daily Telegraph, Dance said that anyone with a conscience should be obsessed with the war and that "there would not be peace in the Middle East until the Balfour Declaration is unpicked... France and England need to announce: 'Sorry, we fucked up'."

== Honours ==
Dance was appointed an Officer of the Order of the British Empire (OBE) on 17 June 2006.

== Acting credits ==
=== Film ===
Key
†	Denotes films that have not yet been released

List of film acting credits
Year	Title	Role	Notes
1981	For Your Eyes Only	Claus	
1985	Plenty	Raymond Brock	
1986	The Golden Child	Sardo Numspa	
1987	White Mischief	Josslyn Hay	
1987	Good Morning, Babylon	D. W. Griffith	
1987	Hidden City	James Richards	
1988	Pascali's Island	Anthony Bowles	
1992	Alien 3	Jonathan Clemens	
1992	The Valley of Stone	Surveyor	aka Kalkstein
1993	Last Action Hero	Mr. Benedict	
1993	Century	Professor Mandry	
1994	China Moon	Rupert Munro	
1994	Kabloonak	Robert J. Flaherty	Paris Film Festival Award for Best Actor
1994	Shortcut to Paradise	Quinn	
1995	The Surgeon	Dr. Ed Mittlesbay	
1996	Space Truckers	Nabel / Macanudo	
1996	Michael Collins	Soames	
1997	The Blood Oranges	Cyril	
1998	What Rats Won't Do	Gerald	
1998	Hilary and Jackie	Derek Du Pré	
1999	Don't Go Breaking My Heart	Frank	
2001	Gosford Park	Raymond Stockbridge	
2001	Jurij	Padre di Jurij	
2001	Dark Blue World	Wing Commander Bentley	
2002	Black and White	Roderic Chamberlain	
2002	Ali G Indahouse	David Carlton	
2003	Swimming Pool	John Bosload	
2003	Labyrinth	Charles Lushington	
2003	City and Crimes	Cox William	
2003	Ladies in Lavender		Director, writer and executive producer only
2006	Dolls	Narrator	Voice; short film
2006	Scoop	Mr. Malcolm	
2006	Twice Upon a Time	Master of Ceremonies	
2006	Starter for 10	Michael Harbinson	
2007	The Contractor	DCS Andrew Windsor	Direct-to-DVD
2007	Intervention	Private Investigator	
2010	Paris Connections	Aleksandr Borinski	
2010	The Commuter	Traffic Warden	Short film
2011	Ironclad	Archbishop Langton	
2011	Your Highness	King Tallious	
2011	There Be Dragons	Monsignor Solano	
2012	Midnight's Children	William Methwold	
2012	Underworld: Awakening	Thomas	
2012	St George's Day	Trenchard	
2013	Patrick	Doctor Roget	
2013	Justin and the Knights of Valour	Legantir	Voice
2014	Viy	Lord Dudley	Credited by his name in Russian: Чарльз Дэнс, romanized: Charlz Dens
2014	Dracula Untold	Master Vampire	
2014	The Imitation Game	Commander Alastair Denniston	
2015	Victor Frankenstein	Baron Frankenstein	
2015	And Then There Were None	Judge Lawrence “Justice” Wargrave	
2015	Michiel de Ruyter	Charles II	
2015	Woman in Gold	Sherman	
2015	Child 44	Major Grachev	
2016	Pride and Prejudice and Zombies	Mr. Bennet	
2016	Me Before You	Stephen Traynor	
2016	Ghostbusters	Harold Filmore	
2016	Despite the Falling Snow	Old Alexander	
2016	Underworld: Blood Wars	Thomas	
2017	Euphoria	Mr. Daren	
2017	That Good Night	The Visitor	
2018	Johnny English Strikes Again	Agent Seven	Cameo
2018	Happy New Year, Colin Burstead	Bertie	
2019	Godzilla: King of the Monsters	Alan Jonah	
2019	Viy 2: Journey to China	Lord Dudley	
2019	Fanny Lye Deliver'd	John Lye	
2020	The Book of Vision	Johan Anmuth	
2020	Mank	William Randolph Hearst	
2021	The King's Man	Lord Kitchener	
2022	Against the Ice	Neergaard	
2022	Lancaster	Narrator	
2022	The Hanging Sun	Jacob	
2024	The First Omen	Father Harris	Cameo
2024	Rumours	Edison Wolcott	
2024	Samana Sunrise	Noah Blum	
2025	Frankenstein	Baron Leopold Frankenstein	
2025	Wildcat	Frasier Mahoney	
2026	Ladies First	Fred Powell	
2028	The Batman: Part II †	Charles Dent	Filming
TBA	My Duchess †	Lord Mountbatten	Post-production

=== Television ===
List of television acting credits
Year	Title	Role	Notes
1974	Father Brown	Commandant Neil O'Brien	Episode: "The Secret Garden"
1974	The Inheritors	Simon Leadbetter	Episode: "Fathers and Sons"
1975	Edward the Seventh	Prince Eddy	2 episodes
1977	Raffles	Teddy Garland	Episode: "Mr. Justice Raffles"
1980, 1984	Play for Today	Colin / Captain John Truman	2 episodes
1981	Little Eyolf	Borghejm	Television Play
1982	Nancy Astor	Edward Hartford-Jones	Episode: "Guest for the Weekend"
1983	The Professionals	Parker	Episode: "The Ojuka Situation"
1983	The Last Day	Alan	Television
1984	The Jewel in the Crown	Guy Perron	5 episodes
1984	The Secret Servant	Harry Maxim	Mini-series
1984	Rainy Day Women	Captain John Truman	Play for Today
1985	Time for Murder	James Latimer	Episode: "This Lightning Always Strikes Twice"
1987	Out on a Limb	Gerry Stamford	2 episodes
1987	Tales of the Unexpected	Robert Smythe	Episode: "Skeleton in the Cupboard"
1988	First Born	Edward Forester	3 episodes
1988	Out of the Shadows	Michael Hayden	Television film
1989	Goldeneye: The Secret Life of Ian Fleming	Ian Fleming	2 episodes
1989	Mission: Impossible	Prime Minister	Episode: "Command Performance"
1990	The Phantom of the Opera	Erik/The Phantom	2 episodes
1996	Undertow	Lyle Yates	Television film
1997	Rebecca	Maxim de Winter	2 episodes
1997	In the Presence of Mine Enemies	Captain Richter	Television film
1999	Chrono-Perambulator	James "Dougie" Douglas	Television short
2000	The Real Spartacus	Narrator	
2000	Mysteries of the Real Sherlock Holmes	Sir Henry Carlyle	Episode: "The Dark Beginnings of Sherlock Holmes"
2000	A History of Britain	George Orwell (voice)	Episode: "The Two Winstons"
2000	Randall & Hopkirk (Deceased)	Kenneth Crisby	Episode: "Drop Dead"
2001	The Life and Adventures of Nicholas Nickleby	Ralph Nickleby	Television film
2002	Foyle's War	Guy Spencer	Episode: "The White Feather"
2002	Dan Dare: Pilot of the Future	Col. Simon Lasker (voice)	Episode: "Pilot of the Future"
2003	Henry VIII	Duke of Buckingham	Television film
2003	Trial & Retribution	Greg Harwood	Television film
2003	Looking for Victoria	Charles Greville	Television film
2004	When Hitler Invaded Britain	Narrator	Documentary
2004	Saint John Bosco: Mission to Love	Marquis Clementi	Television film
2005	Fingersmith	Mr. Lilly	2 episodes
2005	Bleak House	Mr. Tulkinghorn	12 episodes
2005	To the Ends of the Earth	Sir Henry Somerset	Episode: "Close Quarters"
2005	Last Rights	Richard Wheeler	3 episodes
2005	Titanic: Birth of a Legend	Narrator	Documentary
2006	Marple: By the Pricking of My Thumbs	Septimus Bligh	Episode: "By the Pricking of My Thumbs"
2007	Fallen Angel	David Byfield	3 episodes
2007	Consenting Adults	John Wolfenden	Television film
2009	Merlin	Aredian	Episode: "The Witchfinder"
2009	Trinity	Dr. Edmund Maltravers	8 episodes
2010	Going Postal	Havelock Vetinari	2 episodes
2010‍–‍2011	Rosamunde Pilcher's Shades of Love	Edmund Aird	4 episodes
2011‍–‍2015	Game of Thrones	Tywin Lannister	27 episodes
2011	Neverland	Dr. Richard Fludd	Episode: "Part 1"
2012	Secret State	John Hodder	4 episodes
2012	Strike Back: Vengeance	Conrad Knox	10 episodes
2013	Common Ground	Floyd	Pilot episode: "Floyd"
2013	Bones of the Buddha	Narrator	Documentary
2014	The Great Fire	Lord Denton	4 episodes
2015	Childhood's End	Karellen	3 episodes
2015	Deadline Gallipoli	General Ian Hamilton	2 episodes
2015	And Then There Were None	Justice Lawrence Wargrave	3 episodes
2017‍–‍2020	Savage Kingdom	Narrator	22 episodes
2018	The Woman in White	Mr. Fredrick Fairlie	4 episodes
2018	Hang Ups	Jeremy Pitt	4 episodes
2018	The Little Drummer Girl	Commander Picton	2 episodes
2019	The Widow	Martin Benson	7 episodes
2019‍–‍2020	The Crown	Louis, Earl Mountbatten of Burma	Main role (Seasons 3–4); 5 episodes
2020	The Singapore Grip	Mr. Webb	Episode: "Singapore for Beginners"
2020‍–‍2022	Rise of Empires: Ottoman	Narrator	12 episodes
2021‍–‍2022	Moley	Manny the Magic Book	52 episodes
2022	The Sandman	Roderick Burgess	Episode: "Sleep of the Just"
2022	The Serpent Queen	Pope Clement VII	2 episodes
2022	This England	Max Hastings	Episode #1.1
2023	Rabbit Hole	Ben Wilson	8 episodes
2024	The Day of the Jackal	Timothy Winthorp	Miniseries
2024	Renaissance: The Blood and the Beauty	Michelangelo	3 episodes
2025	Washington Black	James Wilde	Miniseries

=== Video games ===
List of video game credits
Year	Title	Voice role	Notes	Ref.
2015	The Witcher 3: Wild Hunt	Emperor Emhyr var Emreis	English Dub	
2018	Call of Duty: Black Ops 4	Godfrey The Butler	"Dead of the Night" Zombies Map	

=== Audiobooks ===
List of audiobook credits
Year	Title	Author	Voice role	Ref.
1985	The Fourth Protocol	Frederick Forsyth	Narrator	

=== Podcasts ===
List of podcast credits
Year	Title	Voice role	Notes	Ref.
2020	Hindsight	Narrator	An Al Jazeera Podcast	

=== Stage ===
- Toad of Toad Hall as Badger (1971)
- The Beggar's Opera as Wat Dreary (Chichester Festival Theatre, 1972)
- The Taming of the Shrew as Philip (Chichester, 1972)
- Three Sisters as Soliony (Greenwich Theatre, 1973)
- Hans Kohlhaus as Meissen (Greenwich, 1973)
- Born Yesterday as Hotel Manager (Greenwich, 1973)
- Saint Joan as Baudricourt (Oxford Festival, 1974)
- The Sleeping Beauty as Prince (1974)
- Travesties as Henry Carr (Leeds Playhouse, 1977)
- Hamlet as Fortinbras / Reynaldo / Player (RSC The Other Place 1975; The Roundhouse, 1976)
- Perkin Warbeck as Hialas / Astley / Spanish Ambassador (RSC The Other Place, 1975)
- Richard III as Catesby / Murderer (RSC The Other Place, 1975)
- Henry V as Henry V (RSC Glasgow and New York, 1975)
- Henry IV, Part One and Henry IV, Part Two as Prince John of Lancaster (RSC Stratford, 1975; Aldwych Theatre, 1976)
- As You Like It as Oliver (RSC Stratford, 1977; Aldwych, 1978)
- Henry V as Scroop / Williams (RSC Stratford, 1977)
- Henry VI, Part 2 as Buckingham (RSC Stratford, 1977; Aldwych, 1978)
- The Jail Diary of Albie Sachs as Whistling Guard / Freeman (RSC Donmar Warehouse, 1978; The Other Place, 1979)
- Coriolanus as Volscian Lieutenant (RSC Stratford, 1977)
- Coriolanus as Tullus Aufidius (Aldwych, 1978 and 1979)
- The Women Pirates as Blackie / Vosquin (RSC Aldwych, 1978)
- The Changeling as Tomazo (RSC Aldwych, 1978)
- Irma la Douce as Nestor (Shaftesbury Theatre, 1979)
- The Heiress as Morris Townsend (1980)
- Turning Over as Frank (Bush Theatre, 1983)
- Coriolanus as Coriolanus (RSC Stratford and Newcastle upon Tyne, 1989; Barbican Theatre, 1990)
- Three Sisters as Vershinin (Birmingham Rep, 1998)
- Good as John Halder (Donmar Warehouse, 1999)
- Long Day's Journey into Night as James Tyrone (Lyric Theatre, 2000)
- The Play What I Wrote as a guest star (Wyndham's Theatre, 2001‍–‍2002) and (Theatre Royal, Bath, 2022)
- Celebration as Richard (Gate Theatre, Dublin; Albery Theatre, 2005)
- The Exonerated (Riverside Studios, Hammersmith, London, 2006)
- Eh Joe as Joe (Parade Theatre, Sydney, 2006)
- Shadowlands as C. S. Lewis (Wyndham's Theatre, 2007 and Novello Theatre 2007‍–‍2008)

== Awards and nominations ==
List of awards and nominations received by Charles Dance
Organizations	Year	Category	Work	Result	Ref.
Actor Awards	2002	Outstanding Performance by a Cast in a Motion Picture	Gosford Park	Won	
Actor Awards	2014	Outstanding Performance by an Ensemble in a Drama Series	Game of Thrones	Nominated	
Actor Awards	2015	Outstanding Performance by an Ensemble in a Drama Series	Game of Thrones	Nominated	
Actor Awards	2015	Outstanding Performance by a Cast in a Motion Picture	The Imitation Game	Nominated	
Actor Awards	2020	Outstanding Performance by an Ensemble in a Drama Series	The Crown	Won	
Actor Awards	2025	Outstanding Performance by an Ensemble in a Drama Series	The Day of the Jackal	Nominated	
Actor Awards	2026	Outstanding Performance by a Cast in a Motion Picture	Frankenstein	Nominated	
BAFTA TV Awards	1985	Best Actor	The Jewel in the Crown	Nominated	
Critics' Choice Awards	2002	Best Acting Ensemble	Gosford Park	Won	
Critics' Circle Theatre Awards	2008	Best Actor	Shadowlands	Won	
Primetime Emmy Awards	2006	Outstanding Lead Actor in a Limited Series or Movie	Bleak House	Nominated	
Primetime Emmy Awards	2018	Outstanding Narrator	Savage Kingdom	Nominated	
Primetime Emmy Awards	2019	Outstanding Narrator	Savage Kingdom	Nominated	
Primetime Emmy Awards	2021	Outstanding Guest Actor in a Drama Series	The Crown	Nominated	
