= Mel Gibson filmography =

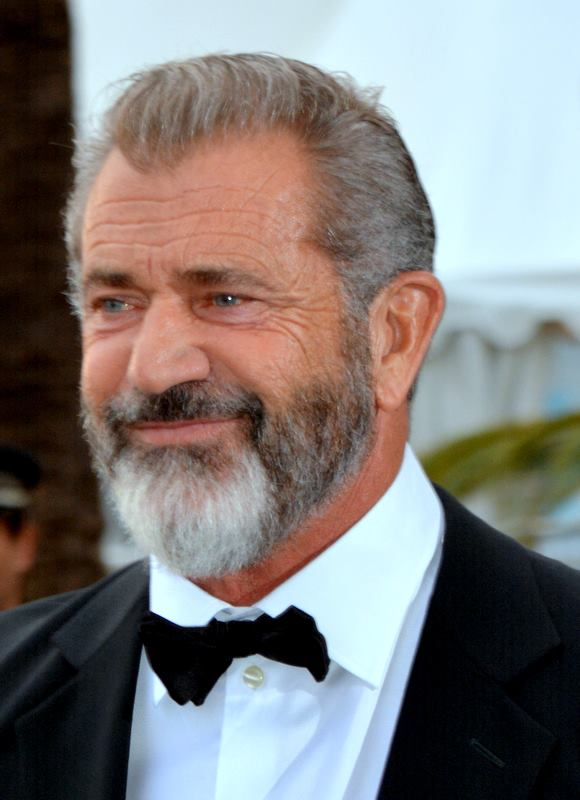
- Mel Gibson at the 2016 Cannes Film Festival
- Film: 72
- Television series: 14
- Theatre: 13

Mel Gibson is an American actor, director, and producer, who made his acting debut on the Australian television drama series The Sullivans (1976–1983). While a student at the National Institute of Dramatic Art in Sydney, he was given an uncredited role in I Never Promised You a Rose Garden and subsequently appeared as a leading actor in the micro budget surf drama Summer City (both in 1977). Gibson rose to prominence during the Australian New Wave cinema movement in the early 1980s, having appeared in his breakthrough role in George Miller's dystopian action film Mad Max (1979), portraying the eponymous hero. He reprised the role in its sequels, Mad Max 2 (1981) and Mad Max Beyond Thunderdome (1985). He appeared in Peter Weir's war drama Gallipoli (1981) and the romantic drama The Year of Living Dangerously (1982). Five years later he played Martin Riggs in the buddy cop action comedy Lethal Weapon alongside Danny Glover—a role he later reprised in its sequels Lethal Weapon 2 (1989), Lethal Weapon 3 (1992), and Lethal Weapon 4 (1998).

Gibson starred in Franco Zeffirelli's Hamlet in 1990, as the eponymous character of the Shakespearean tragedy of the same name. It was the first film produced by Icon Productions, a production company he co-founded with Bruce Davey. Gibson's directorial debut was The Man Without a Face (1993), an adaptation of Isabelle Holland's novel of the same name. Two years later he directed and produced Braveheart, a historical epic drama in which he also portrayed Sir William Wallace, a 13th-century Scottish knight. The film earned him a Golden Globe Award and the Academy Award for Best Director, and the film won an Academy Award for Best Picture. Gibson went on to star in Ransom (1996), Payback (1999), What Women Want and The Patriot (both in 2000), and We Were Soldiers (2002).

Gibson co-wrote, directed and produced The Passion of the Christ in 2004, a Biblical epic drama which chronicled the Passion of Jesus. On its release, the film garnered mixed reviews as well as notoriety for its graphic violence from critics. It grossed $370.3 million in the United States and $611.4 million worldwide, making it Gibson's highest-grossing film to date (as a director). Two years later he co-wrote, directed and produced Apocalypto, an epic adventure set in Central America depicting the last days of Mayan civilization before Spanish arrival in the 16th century. Gibson then took a ten-year hiatus from directing during which time he landed roles in Edge of Darkness (2010), Machete Kills (2013), The Expendables 3 (2014), and Blood Father (2016). He directed Hacksaw Ridge in 2016, a biographical war drama focusing on American World War II veteran Desmond Doss, the first conscientious objector to receive the Medal of Honor. The film garnered praise from critics and audiences alike, as well as various accolades.

== Film ==
Key
†	Denotes films that have not yet been released

List of Mel Gibson acting and filmmaking credits
Year	Title	Director	Writer	Producer	Actor	Role	Notes	Ref.
1977	I Never Promised You a Rose Garden	No	No	No	Yes		Uncredited	
1977	Summer City	No	No	No	Yes	Scallop		
1979	Mad Max	No	No	No	Yes	Max Rockatansky		
1979	Tim	No	No	No	Yes	Tim Melville		
1980	The Chain Reaction	No	No	No	Yes	Mechanic	Cameo	
1981	Attack Force Z	No	No	No	Yes	Paul Kelly		
1981	Gallipoli	No	No	No	Yes	Frank Dunne		
1981	Mad Max 2	No	No	No	Yes	Max Rockatansky		
1982	The Year of Living Dangerously	No	No	No	Yes	Guy Hamilton		
1984	The Bounty	No	No	No	Yes	Fletcher Christian		
1984	The River	No	No	No	Yes	Tom Garvey		
1984	Mrs. Soffel	No	No	No	Yes	Ed Biddle		
1985	Mad Max Beyond Thunderdome	No	No	No	Yes	Max Rockatansky		
1987	Lethal Weapon	No	No	No	Yes	Martin Riggs		
1988	Tequila Sunrise	No	No	No	Yes	Dale McKussic		
1989	Lethal Weapon 2	No	No	No	Yes	Martin Riggs		
1990	Bird on a Wire	No	No	No	Yes	Rick Jarmin		
1990	Air America	No	No	No	Yes	Gene Ryack		
1990	Hamlet	No	No	No	Yes	Prince Hamlet		
1992	Forever Young	No	No	Yes	Yes	Daniel McCormick	Executive	
1992	Lethal Weapon 3	No	No	No	Yes	Martin Riggs		
1993	The Man Without a Face	Yes	No	No	Yes	Justin McLeod		
1994	Maverick	No	No	No	Yes	Bret Maverick		
1995	Braveheart	Yes	No	Yes	Yes	William Wallace		
1995	Casper	No	No	No	Yes	Himself	Cameo	
1995	Pocahontas	No	No	No	Yes	John Smith	Voice role	
1996	Ransom	No	No	No	Yes	Tom Mullen		
1997	Fathers' Day	No	No	No	Yes	Scott, the Body Piercer	Cameo	
1997	Conspiracy Theory	No	No	No	Yes	Jerry Fletcher		
1997	FairyTale: A True Story	No	No	No	Yes	Major Sargent Griffiths	Cameo	
1997	One Eight Seven	No	No	Yes	No	—N/a	Executive	
1998	Lethal Weapon 4	No	No	No	Yes	Martin Riggs		
1999	Payback	No	No	No	Yes	Porter		
2000	Chicken Run	No	No	No	Yes	Rocky	Voice role	
2000	The Patriot	No	No	No	Yes	Benjamin Martin		
2000	What Women Want	No	No	No	Yes	Nick Marshall		
2000	The Million Dollar Hotel	No	No	No	Yes	Agent Skinner		
2002	We Were Soldiers	No	No	No	Yes	Lieutenant Colonel Hal Moore		
2002	Signs	No	No	No	Yes	Father Graham Hess		
2003	The Singing Detective	No	No	Yes	Yes	Dr. Gibbon		
2004	The Passion of the Christ	Yes	Yes	Yes	No	—N/a		
2004	Paparazzi	No	No	Yes	Yes	Anger Management Therapy Patient	Cameo	
2006	Apocalypto	Yes	Yes	Yes	No	—N/a		
2010	Edge of Darkness	No	No	No	Yes	Thomas Craven		
2011	The Beaver	No	No	No	Yes	Walter Black		
2012	Get the Gringo	No	Yes	Yes	Yes	Richard "The Gringo" Johnson		
2013	Machete Kills	No	No	No	Yes	Luther Voz		
2014	The Expendables 3	No	No	No	Yes	Conrad Stonebanks		
2014	Stonehearst Asylum	No	No	Yes	No	—N/a		
2016	Blood Father	No	No	No	Yes	John Link		
2016	Hacksaw Ridge	Yes	No	No	No	—N/a		
2017	Daddy's Home 2	No	No	Yes	Yes	Kurt Mayron		
2018	Dragged Across Concrete	No	No	No	Yes	Detective Brett Ridgeman		
2019	The Professor and the Madman	No	No	Yes	Yes	James Murray		
2020	Force of Nature	No	No	No	Yes	Ray Barrett		
2020	Fatman	No	No	No	Yes	Chris Cringle		
2021	Boss Level	No	No	No	Yes	Colonel Clive Ventor		
2021	Dangerous	No	No	No	Yes	Dr. Alderwood		
2022	Last Looks	No	No	No	Yes	Alastair Pinch		
2022	Panama	No	No	No	Yes	Stark		
2022	Agent Game	No	No	No	Yes	CIA Station Chief Olsen		
2022	Father Stu	No	No	No	Yes	Bill Long		
2022	Hot Seat	No	No	No	Yes	Wallace Reed		
2022	Bandit	No	No	No	Yes	Tommy Kay		
2022	On the Line	No	No	Yes	Yes	Elvis Cooney	Executive	
2023	Confidential Informant	No	No	No	Yes	Kevin Hickey		
2023	Sound of Freedom	No	No	Yes	No	—N/a	Executive	
2023	Desperation Road	No	No	No	Yes	Mitchell Gaines		
2024	Boneyard	No	No	No	Yes	Agent Petrovick		
2024	Monster Summer	No	No	No	Yes	Gene Carruthers		
2025	Flight Risk	Yes	No	Yes	No	—N/a		
2025	Hunting Season	No	No	No	Yes	Bowdrie		
2027	The Resurrection of the Christ: Part One †	Yes	Yes	Yes	No	—N/a		
2028	The Resurrection of the Christ: Part Two †	Yes	Yes	Yes	No	—N/a		

Production consultant

- Air Strike (2018)

== Television ==
List of Mel Gibson television acting and producing credits
Year	Title	Director	Executive Producer	Actor	Role	Notes	Ref.
1978	The Sullivans	No	No	Yes	Ray Henderson	4 episodes	
1979	Cop Shop	No	No	Yes	Peter Lang	2 episodes	
1979	The Hero	No	No	Yes	Rob Milligan	Short	
1981	Punishment	No	No	Yes	Rick Munro	2 episodes	
1981	Tickled Pink	No	No	Yes		Episode "Honeymoon, Honeymoon"	
1989	Saturday Night Live	No	No	Yes	Host	Episode: "Mel Gibson / Living Colour"	
1995	World of Discovery	No	No	Yes	The Narrator	Voice role; episode: "Australia's Outback: The Vanishing Frontier"	
1999	The Simpsons	No	No	Yes	Himself	Voice role; episode: "Beyond Blunderdome"	
2000	The Three Stooges	No	Yes	No	—N/a	Television film	
2001	Invincible	No	Yes	No	—N/a	Television film	
2003	Family Curse	No	Yes	No	—N/a	Television film	
2004–2005	Clubhouse	No	Yes	No	—N/a		
2004–2005	Complete Savages	Yes	Yes	Yes	Officer Steve Cox	3 episodes (director, actor)	
2008	Carrier	No	Yes	No	—N/a	Documentary	
2023	The Continental: From the World of John Wick	No	No	Yes	Cormac O'Connor	Miniseries	

== Theatre ==
List of Mel Gibson stage acting credits
Year	Title	Venue	Notes	Ref.
1976	Le Chateau d'Hydro-Therapie Magnetique	Jane Street Theatre, Sydney	With Steve Bisley	
1977	Mother and Son	NIDA Theatre, Sydney	With Steve Bisley and Judy Davis	
1977	The Hostage	NIDA Theatre, Sydney	With Steve Bisley	
1977	Once in a Lifetime	NIDA Theatre, Sydney	With Steve Bisley and Judy Davis	
1978	Oedipus the King	Adelaide Festival of the Arts	With Colin Friels	
1978	Cedoona	Adelaide Festival of the Arts	With Colin Friels and Judy Davis	
1978	The Les Darcy Show	Adelaide Festival of the Arts	With Colin Friels and Judy Davis	
1979	Romeo and Juliet	Perth & Sydney	With Angela Punch-McGregor	
1979	Waiting for Godot		With Geoffrey Rush	
1979	On Our Selection	Sydney	Directed by George Whaley	
1981	No Names, No Pack Drill	Sydney	With Noni Hazelhurst	
1982	Death of a Salesman	Sydney	Directed by George Ogilvie	
1993	Love Letters	Telluride, Colorado	With Sissy Spacek	
