= The Passion of the Christ (film series) =

American film series

- Created by: Mel Gibson; Benedict Fitzgerald
- Original work: The Passion of the Christ (2004)
- Owner: Icon Productions
- Years: 2004–present
- Based on: Canonical Gospels

The Passion of the Christ is an American multi-language film series consisting of epic biblical drama movies, based on the gospels of Matthew, Mark, Luke and John as presented in the Bible. The film series is directed, co-written, and produced by Mel Gibson. The films center around Jesus Christ's life, ministry, death, and resurrection.

Gibson produced the first installment due to Hollywood's disinterest in developing it. Following the financial success of the original movie, Gibson negotiated a contract with Lionsgate to serve as both a production studio, and the distributing company for the sequels. Though the first installment was met with polarizing reception, including a mixed at best critical reception, despite the acclaim it received from its audience, it exceeded expectations by becoming a box office hit and became a financial success through its ticket sales.

Notably, The Passion of the Christ was also the highest-grossing R-rated film for two decades. Earning its status as one of the greatest Christian-themed movies of all time, it also remains the most financially successful of the genre in film history, as well as the highest-grossing independent film of all time. It received three nominations at the 77th Academy Awards in 2005, for Best Makeup, Best Cinematography, and Best Original Score.

Its sequels, the second and third installments in the film series, began principal photography in August 2025 and are currently scheduled to be released theatrically in 2027 and 2028, respectively.

== Origin ==
Gibson stated that inspiration for the film series was partially influenced by his own personal tribulations. A decade prior to the release of The Passion of the Christ, he had a personal crisis overcoming substance abuse where he additionally struggled with suicidal thoughts, but he turned to God through prayer instead. While rereading The Holy Bible, the filmmaker explained that he had a spiritual awakening which inspired him to develop a film about his rekindled faith in the Savior.

Though a sequel project remained in development for decades, Gibson stated that after the 2025 Greater Los Angeles wildfires he felt a spiritual purification following losing his home and possessions in the fire. The filmmaker stated: "I'm going to miss some stuff. There was some valuable stuff, some personal stuff, but I feel like I'm being stripped down and prepared for something else. I feel like the Almighty is preparing me to do something big." When asked if he believed this was to prepare him to begin production on The Resurrection of the Christ, he affirmed that losing his personal items allows him to focus on what he believes is a calling from a higher power to make the film.

== Films ==
Film	U.S. release date	Director	Screenwriter	Story by	Producers	Language(s)
The Passion of the Christ	February 25, 2004	Mel Gibson	Mel Gibson & Benedict Fitzgerald (Note: The script was translated by William Fulco, S.J. into its spoken Latin and reconstructed-Aramaic languages.)	Mel Gibson & Benedict Fitzgerald	Mel Gibson, Bruce Davey and Stephen McEveety	Aramaic Hebrew Latin
The Resurrection of the Christ: Part One	May 6, 2027	Mel Gibson	Mel Gibson & Randall Wallace	Mel Gibson & Donal Gibson and Randall Wallace	Mel Gibson and Bruce Davey	English
The Resurrection of the Christ: Part Two	May 28, 2028	Mel Gibson	Mel Gibson & Randall Wallace	Mel Gibson & Donal Gibson and Randall Wallace	Mel Gibson and Bruce Davey	English

=== The Passion of the Christ (2004) ===
The first installment of the series (originally titled The Passion and The Passion of Christ, later retitled to The Passion of the Christ) depicts the Passion of Jesus largely according to the gospels of Matthew, Mark, Luke, and John. The film centers around the final 12 hours before Jesus Christ's death, beginning with the Agony in the Garden of Olives/Gethsemane and ending with a brief description of his resurrection.

The Passion of the Christ was released on February 25, 2004, with multiple reviews from critics. It earned $612.1 million worldwide against a $30 million budget and became the fifth highest-grossing film of 2004.

=== Future ===
==== The Resurrection of the Christ: Part One (2027) ====
After spending years in development hell, a sequel was officially in development by February 2023. The plot would focus on the three days between Jesus' death and resurrection, as well as a depiction of the events of the War in Heaven with the "origin" of Satan and his fallen angels, explore different realms including Hell, and also end with the death of Christ's Apostles. Principal photography had been scheduled to commence on April 30, 2023; but following delays Gibson began location scouting in Europe by September 2024. Later that month, the filmmaker stated that the actors reprising their roles from the first movie, would de-aged through the use of VFX. In July 2023, Caviezel stated that the current draft of the script constitutes 2-3 sequels and would be multiple movies.

In January 2025, Mel Gibson was a guest on Joe Rogan's podcast and during the lengthy interview, he announced the film as his next project and stated that its current title is The Resurrection of the Christ. Confirming that it is in pre-production, the filmmaker stated that he felt the need to spiritually prepare for the work that would be required to finish the project, while saying that principal photography would likely commence in 2026. The script was written in collaboration by Gibson, his brother Donal, and Randall Wallace over a seven-year period. Though Deadline reported that the lead role would be recast, when Rogan asked if this would be the case, Gibson stated that despite the decades that have passed Jim Caviezel would reprise the role; while acknowledging that the use of CGI and various special effects would be used to allow the actor to appear the same age.

Later that month, following the 2025 Greater Los Angeles wildfires Gibson confirmed the movie was in pre-production, expressing that he felt a spiritual purification following losing his home and possessions in the fire. The filmmaker stated that he believed the experience helped to prepare him to begin production on The Resurrection of the Christ, he affirmed that losing his personal items allows him to focus on what he believes as a calling from a higher power to make the film. It was later reported that principal photography was tentatively scheduled to commence at the end of February, or beginning of March 2025. By March, it was officially announced that production would commence during the summer of 2025. By May 2025, Lionsgate Films announced that it would serve as one of the production studios, as well as the distributing company. The company released a short teaser trailer alongside the announcement, which reveals the official logo.

Principal photography is scheduled for August 2025 in Rome, Italy at Cinecittà Studios. Gibson confirmed in May 2025, that the project would potentially be two feature films. By August of the same year, movie was confirmed to be two feature-length movies which would enter principal photography back-to-back. Gibson would serve as producer, alongside Bruce Davey. The project's second teaser trailer, announcing the release dates for the sequels was released that month. By October, after principal photography had begun, it was reported that Caviezel and Belucci had exited the film, with their roles being recast. Days later, it was announced that the entire cast of the original movie would be replaced due to the cost of using de-aging CGI special effects. Finnish actor Jaakko Ohtonen was cast as Jesus, Kasia Smutniak as Mary (mother of Jesus), Pier Luigi Pasino as Peter, and Riccardo Scamarcio as Pontius Pilate; respectively replacing Caviezel, Morgenstern, De Vito, Shopov, while Rupert Everett was cast in an undisclosed role. On April 30, 2026, filming wrapped.

The Resurrection of the Christ: Part One is currently scheduled to release theatrically on Ascension Day, on May 6, 2027.

==== The Resurrection of the Christ: Part Two (2028) ====
In July 2023, Caviezel stated the script for The Resurrection of the Christ is long enough that it may require 2-3 movies to fully realize the project. In May 2025, Gibson confirmed that the project would be two feature films. In August of the same year, Lionsgate officially announced that two feature film sequels to The Passion of the Christ, would enter principal photography back-to-back later that month. Gibson would serve as producer, alongside Bruce Davey. The project's first teaser trailer, announcing the release dates debuted with the studio's announcement.

Principal photography commenced August 2025 located in Rome, Italy at Cinecittà Studios. The project's second teaser trailer, announcing the release dates for the sequels was released that month. By October, after principal photography had begun, it was announced the movies would feature a new cast. Principal photography wrapped on April 30, 2026.

After being moved from its previously scheduled release, The Resurrection of the Christ: Part Two is slated to release theatrically on Ascension Day, on May 25, 2028.

== Main cast and characters ==
List indicators

This section includes characters who will appear or have appeared in the franchise in main roles.

- An empty grey cell indicates the character was not in the film, or that the character's official presence has not yet been confirmed.
- ^{V} indicates a voice-only role.
- ^{Y} indicates a younger version of the character.

Character
Character	The Passion of the Christ	The Resurrection of the Christ: Part One	The Resurrection of the Christ: Part Two
Jesus Christ	Jim Caviezel (Note: Andrea Ivan Refuto portrays Jesus, as a child during flashback sequences in The Passion of the Christ (2004).)	Jaakko Ohtonen	Jaakko Ohtonen
Mary	Maia Morgenstern	Kasia Smutniak	Kasia Smutniak
Mary Magdalene	Monica Bellucci	Mariela Garriga	Mariela Garriga
Peter	Francesco De Vito	Pier Luigi Pasino	Pier Luigi Pasino
James	Chokri Ben Zagden	TBA	TBA
John	Hristo Jivkov (Note: Hristo Jivkov was reported to reprise his role as John the Apostle on The Passion of the Christ: Resurrection, but died on March 2023 from cancer.)	TBA	TBA
Joseph of Arimathea	Giacinto Ferro	TBA	TBA
Nicodemus	Olek Mincer	TBA	TBA
Judas	Luca Lionello		
Annas ben Seth	Toni Bertorelli		
Caiaphas	Mattia Sbragia	TBA	TBA
Herod Ántipas	Luca De Dominicis	TBA	TBA
Pontius Pilate	Hristo Naumov Shopov	Riccardo Scamarcio	Riccardo Scamarcio
Claudia Procles	Claudia Gerini	TBA	TBA
Barabbas	Pedro Sarubbi	TBA	TBA
Satan	Rosalinda Celentano (Note: Celentano physically portrays Satan, while an unnamed male actor portrayed the voice.)	TBA	TBA

== Additional crew and production details ==
Film	Crew/Detail					
Film	Composer	Cinematographer	Editors	Production companies	Distributing companies	Running time
The Passion of the Christ	John Debney	Caleb Deschanel	John Wright & Steve Mirkovich	Icon Productions	Newmarket Films LLC	2 hrs 7 mins
The Resurrection of the Christ: Part One		Robrecht Heyvaert	TBA	Icon Productions	Lionsgate	TBA
The Resurrection of the Christ: Part Two		Robrecht Heyvaert	TBA	Icon Productions	Lionsgate	TBA

== Reception ==
=== Box office and financial performance ===
Film	Box office gross			Box office ranking		Budget	Worldwide total net income	Ref.
Film	North America	Other territories	Worldwide	All-time North America	All-time worldwide	Budget	Worldwide total net income	Ref.
The Passion of the Christ	$370,782,930	$251,530,705	$622,313,635	#62	#182	$30,000,000	$597,313,635	
The Resurrection of the Christ: Part One						$100,000,000		
The Resurrection of the Christ: Part Two						TBA		

=== Critical and public response ===
Film	Rotten Tomatoes Tomatometer score	Metacritic Metascore	CinemaScore
The Passion of the Christ	50% (278 reviews)	47/100 (44 reviews)	A+
The Resurrection of the Christ: Part One			
The Resurrection of the Christ: Part Two			

== Music ==
=== Soundtracks ===
Title	U.S. release date	Length	Composer(s)	Label
The Passion of the Christ: Original Motion Picture Soundtrack	February 24, 2004	54:09	John Debney	Sony Music, Integrity Music
The Resurrection of the Christ: Part One - Original Motion Picture Soundtrack	TBA	TBA	TBA	TBA
The Resurrection of the Christ: Part Two - Original Motion Picture Soundtrack	TBA	TBA	TBA	TBA
