= Paparazzi (2004 film) =

2004 film by Paul Abascal

- Theatrical release poster
- Directed by: Paul Abascal
- Written by: Forry Smith
- Produced by: Mel Gibson; Bruce Davey
- Starring: Cole Hauser; Robin Tunney; Dennis Farina; Daniel Baldwin; Tom Sizemore
- Cinematography: Daryn Okada
- Edited by: Robin Russell
- Music by: Brian Tyler
- Production company: Icon Entertainment
- Distributed by: 20th Century Fox
- Release date: September 3, 2004 (United States)
- Running time: 84 minutes
- Country: United States
- Languages: English; Spanish
- Budget: $20 million
- Box office: $16 million

Paparazzi is a 2004 American action thriller film directed by Paul Abascal, produced by Mel Gibson, and starring Cole Hauser, Robin Tunney, Dennis Farina, Daniel Baldwin and Tom Sizemore.

The film chronicles the life of popular Hollywood film star Bo Laramie in the aftermath of a car crash caused by four paparazzo tabloid photographers. Bo soon goes on a quest to get revenge on the gang for almost killing him and his family.

Paparazzi was released on September 3, 2004, in the United States to a critical and commercial failure.

== Plot ==
Rising Hollywood movie star Bo Laramie finally achieves major success with his latest film Adrenaline Force. After the film's premiere, a persistent group of unscrupulous photographers—Kevin Rosner, Leonard Clark, Wendell Stokes and their leader Rex Harper—harass Bo and his wife Abby, along with their 8-year-old son Zach. When Bo takes Zach to soccer practice, he eyes Rex taking photos of Zach and confronts him, leading Rex to provoke Bo into punching him, caught on camera by his fellow photographers. Bo is sued as a result and is placed into anger management. Meanwhile, Rex vows to destroy Bo and those close to him.

As Bo, Abby and Zach return from an event, Rex and his crew drive up beside them, in four different vehicles, and blind them by taking pictures. Bo's car is hit by a pickup truck while Rex and his crew snap photos of the wreck they caused. While Bo is not seriously injured, Abby's spleen is removed and Zach is placed in a coma.

Bo is told by LAPD detective Burton that the paparazzi each gave him the same story of finding the wreck after it happened, with no witnesses to dispute their claims. Some time later, Bo accidentally causes Kevin to wipe out on his motorcycle, careening onto a precipice. Bo tries to save him, but when Kevin gloats that they'll put his family through hell, Bo lets him fall from the cliff to his death.

Bo makes Leonard his next target, secretly placing a prop gun in the jacket left in Leonard's car, whilst Leonard invades Bo's movie set and is ejected by security. Following him, Bo calls 911, and describes Leonard's car, saying that the driver is waving a gun. Leonard is pulled over and, reaching into his jacket for his ID, instead pulls out the prop gun, causing the cops to shoot him dead.

Convinced Bo will target them next, Rex and Wendell break into Bo's house to plant cameras inside, unaware that Bo was snooping around in Wendell's place to discover they were planting miniature cameras in his place. Abby runs into Wendell, who assaults her and threatens to kill Zach if she tells the police, though Wendell's actions didn't sit well with Rex. Bo finds some of the cameras and dismantled them and Burton assigns Deputy Walker and Deputy Wilson to provide extra security, but Bo sneaks out past the two deputies and into Wendell's house.

Wendell arrives at his home where Bo confronts him with a baseball bat. In the morning, Bo puts the car back where it was at, and races to beat Burton, on his way to the house. Burton shows Bo a video taken by a camera in a button of Leonard's shirt on the movie set, and thinks someone planted the gun in Leonard's coat. Rex soon finds Wendell beaten to death, and Bo planted the bat in Rex's houseboat to frame him.

After triggering a photo enforcement radar while driving, Burton realizes traffic camera footage will prove what really happened at Bo's crash, along with the testimony of Emily, who was with Rex at the event and was blackmailed to keep her mouth shut, prompted by her guilt to come forward. At Wendell's house, Burton notices the video feed from the cameras in Bo's house and Rex entering with a gun. Rex goes to Bo and Abby's bedroom and opens fire, only for Bo to hit Rex and throw him to the floor.

Bo viciously beats Rex, gloating about how he got his revenge. Rex is finally arrested by Burton, adding to a charge that he had previously harassed and raped Emily, and a charge of killing Wendell. As Rex is led away, he's the one who's being relentlessly photographed by paparazzi's. One of them even asks Rex if he killed Kevin. Bo is enjoying watching the paparazzi give Rex a taste of his own medicine. With that, Rex and his crew are out of the lives of Bo and his family.

Later, as Bo is finishing filming, he's called to the hospital, where Zach has awakened from his coma. Bo, Abby and Zach later attend at the premiere of Bo's newest film, a sequel to Adrenaline Force, and Abby is now pregnant with a girl. After the film, Bo meets the press out front, taking a paparazzi's jibe at him in his stride.

== Cast ==
- Cole Hauser as Bo Laramie
- Robin Tunney as Abby Laramie, Bo's wife.
- Dennis Farina as Detective Burton
- Daniel Baldwin as Wendell Stokes
- Tom Hollander as Leonard Clark
- Kevin Gage as Kevin Rosner
- Blake Michael Bryan as Zach Laramie, Bo and Abby's 8-year-old son.
- Tom Sizemore as Rex Harper
- Forry Smith as Deputy Walker
- Donal Gibson as Deputy Wilson

Mel Gibson, who was one of the film's producers, appears as an anger management patient in the waiting room of their shared therapist. In addition, Chris Rock appears as a pizza delivery driver, Vince Vaughn appears as Bo Laramie's co-star, and Matthew McConaughey appears as himself at a movie premiere.

At about forty minutes into the movie, Detective Burton (Dennis Farina) tells Bo how one of the paparazzi, Wendell Stokes, has previously sued "Alec Baldwin" or one of the "Baldwins". Daniel Baldwin plays paparazzi Stokes in the movie (see Baldwin brothers).

== Production ==
In April 2002, it was reported that 20th Century Fox greenlit Paparazzi, a thriller written by Forry Smith about a movie star who plots revenge after relentless pursuit by paparazzi result in a near fatal tragedy. The film was the first project in a two-year first-look deal between Fox and Mel Gibson's Icon Productions. Kurt Russell was initially in negotiations to star in the film. The film was a pet project of Gibson's and directed by Paul Abascal, who had previously directed episodes of Secret Agent Man, Witchblade, and Nash Bridges but had started his career as a hair stylist for Gibson on Lethal Weapon 1, 2, and 3. In October of that year, Cole Hauser was cast as the lead. In March 2003, it was reported that Tom Sizemore had been cast opposite Hauser.

== Reception ==
=== Box office ===
The film was a box office bomb, having cost about US$20 million to be made, and grossing only $16 million worldwide.

- United States Domestic Gross: US$ 15,714,234
- International Gross: US$891,529
- Total Worldwide Gross: US$16,605,763

=== Critical response ===
On the review aggregator website Rotten Tomatoes, 17% of 83 critics' reviews are positive, with an average rating of 3.8/10. The website's consensus reads: "A crude, ludicrous exploitation movie with a questionable moral." Metacritic, which uses a weighted average, assigned the film a score of 38 out of 100, based on 18 critics, indicating "generally unfavorable" reviews.

The film also received a large amount of negative criticism from major American, Canadian and British publications:

- "Amazingly arrogant, immoral film." -- Dave Kehr, The New York Times
- "The audacity of the paparazzi is a good topic, but this imbecilic film has no idea how to focus its intentions." -- E! Online
- "First-time director Paul Abascal is an ex-hairdresser whose debut film wallows in melodramatic excesses - tense, shrieking music, spitting, sputtering villains and a hero who is right and righteous because, well, he's a celebrity! And even celebrities have vengeance fantasies!"—Roger Moore, Chicago Tribune
- "Especially since the death of Princess Diana, guerilla photographers who snap celebrity candids have come to be considered the gum on the bottom of society's shoe. The film Paparazzi exploits this built-in audience disgust to characterize them as somewhere between slugs and dung beetles on the morality scale, deserving whatever they get."—Derek Armstrong, Allmovie
- "The martyr is action star Bo Laramie (Cole Hauser, playing the role as if he were slipped Rohypnol in a drink and forced to be in this movie!)."—Jim Slotek, Jam!
- "[Bo] takes the paparazzi out with extreme prejudice, for which he is investigated by a Columbo-esque cop who not-so-secretly approves of this old school justice. It's just so embarrassing you wish the cinema would fit swivel seats so you can look round at the back wall when he comes on. The movie damns all paparazzi as parasitical villains." -- Peter Bradshaw, The Guardian
