= Dendy Cinemas =

Australian cinema group

Dendy Cinema Pty Limited
- Founded: 1980; 46 years ago
- Founders: Robert Ward
- Headquarters: Newtown, New South Wales, Australia
- Parent: Icon Productions
- Website: www.dendy.com.au/home/

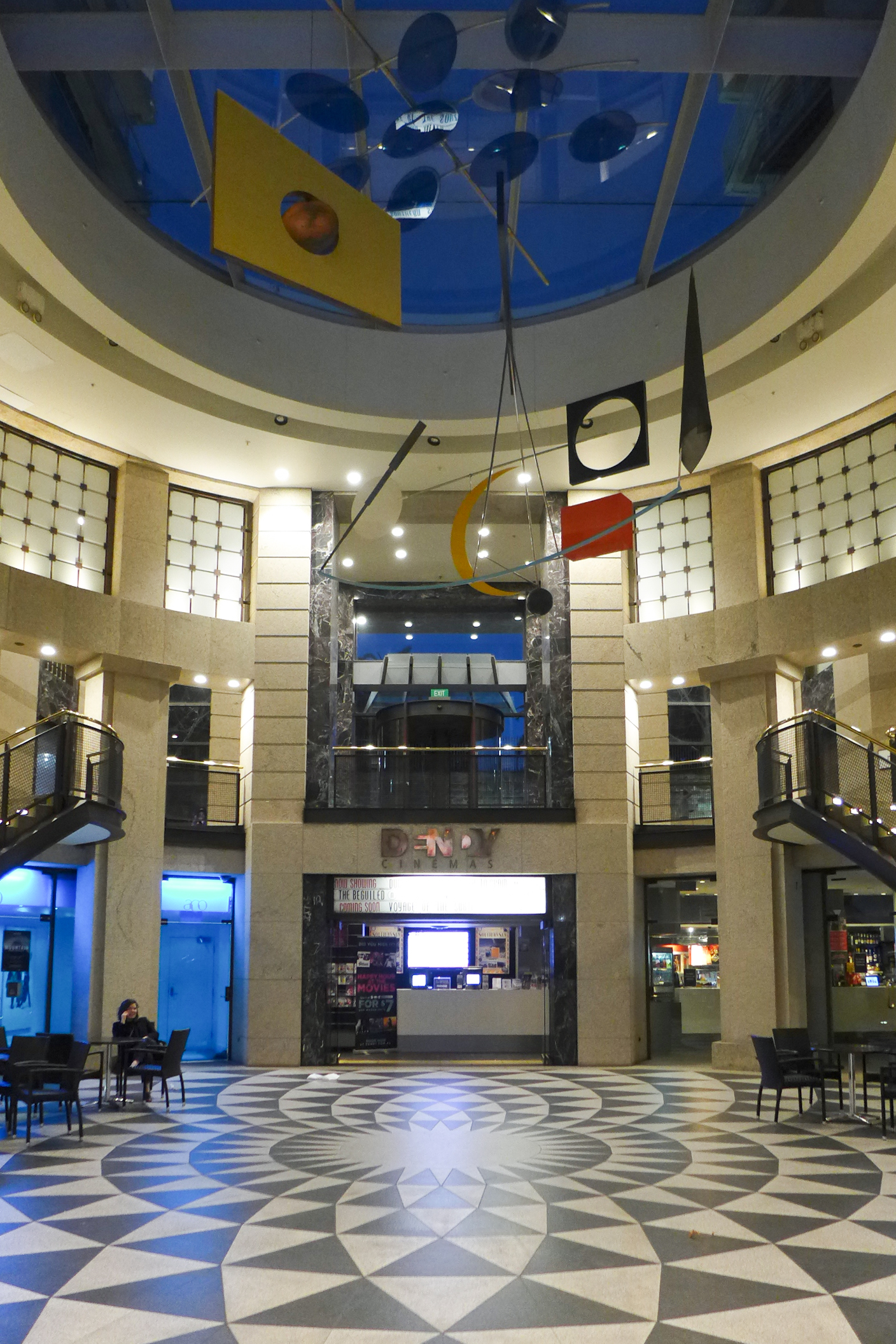
Dendy Cinemas in East Circular Quay, Sydney, now closed

Dendy Cinema Pty Limited is an Australian cinema chain. As of 2025 it operates multiplex cinemas in Sydney, Canberra, the Gold Coast, and Brisbane. The company is a subsidiary of the Dendy Icon Group, which also owns Icon Productions, Icon Film Distribution, and Icon Film Finance.

== Ownership history ==
The Dendy name has its origins in Melbourne, Victoria, where the Dendy Theatre was built in Middle Brighton in 1940. The original owner of the Dendy (later renamed Dendy Cinema), Bert Ward (born c. 1907), passed his cinema industry knowledge and skills to his son Robert Ward OAM (died 2017). (Note: The family dynasty in the cinema business comprised Robert Glanville "Bert" Ward XIII; Robert Ward XIV; and Robert Cameron Ward XV.) Under Robert, the Dendy cinema brand spread first into the city in Collins Street, then across the suburbs and interstate. In 1967 Ward was approached by Mark Josem, owner of the only independently owned drive-in cinema in Melbourne, leading to the establishment of Filmways Australasian Distributors, a company which started out distributing arthouse films for independent cinemas.

In 1971, the Dendy Cinema group was said to be the last chain of independent cinemas in Australia, and included the Brighton cinema, the Sandringham Drive-In at Sandringham, the Gala Cinema at Dandenong, and the Forest Hill Theatre at Forest Hill. In July of that year, it opened a new Dendy Cinema at Malvern. By 1977, there were Dendy cinemas in Sydney, Adelaide, and Brisbane, as well as across Melbourne. (Note: There were several cinemas in Melbourne named Dendy during the 1970s, including the Lumiere (opened as Dendy 1974); Metro Malvern (renamed Dendy in 1972); Village Twin (opened as Dendy 1974); and the Dendy Adult Cinema Complex (c.1975-2016).) The Dendy Martin Place opened in Martin Place, Sydney around 1981.

The Becker Group purchased the Dendy Cinemas chain in December 1997 and took over management in 1998. Prime Media Group took control of Becker Group, including Dendy Cinemas, in 2007. Prime made a bid to buy the Hoyts cinema chain in September 2007, and after it missed out, media reported that Prime was looking to sell Dendy Cinemas before the end of the year.

After a long takeover bid, Mel Gibson's company Icon Film Distribution paid Prime $21 million for the cinema chain in 2008. At the time, Dendy was Australia's largest independent film distributor and art house cinema chain. Becker Group had originally planned to sell its cinema assets to the Becker family.

As of January 2025, the Icon Productions website states that the Dendy Icon Group comprises Icon Productions, Icon Film Distribution, Dendy Cinemas, and Icon Film Finance.

== Cinema operations history ==
=== Sydney ===
Dendy Martin Place, a single-screen cinema, opened in 1981 with a screening of Stepping Out, a documentary by Chris Noonan. Barbara Grummells and Fred O'Brien were the owners, launching the venue with the slogan "From tart house to art house". In September 2003, as one of the few single-screen cinemas left in Sydney, it closed its doors for the last time, with a final screening of Reservoir Dogs. Retail and commercial activities were planned for its site, part of the MLC Centre. At that time, Dendy George Street (a single-screen cinema) had also closed. Dendy still operated several multi-screen cinemas, including Dendy Opera Quays and Dendy Newtown in Newtown, Sydney, as well as at Byron Bay, Brisbane and Melbourne.

Dendy closed its Circular Quay cinema on 26 February 2020 after a decision not to renew its lease.

By 2021, the sole remaining Dendy cinema in Sydney was in Newtown.

=== Brisbane ===
Lyn McCarthy and Graham Tubbenhauer launched a Dendy Cinema in 1990 on Edward Street. In 1994, the Dendy Cinemas chain took over The George on George Street, Brisbane, and added a second screen to the complex. The two-screen Dendy complex closed in 2008.

Dendy opened a cinema at Portside Wharf in Hamilton in 2006.

In 2015, Dendy Cinemas committed to a 15-year lease to operate a 10-theatre cinema complex in Coorparoo Square in Brisbane's inner southeast.

=== Byron Bay ===
Dendy operated a Byron Bay cinema complex between 2002 and 2012. Movie chain Palace announced it would take over the site.

=== Canberra ===
In 2005, Canberra cinema Electric Shadows, which was established in 1979, announced it would partner with Dendy Cinemas to establish a cinema complex in the Canberra Centre. The Canberra complex featured nine cinemas in a 4000 sq m complex, with seats for up to 1600 people. The complex opened ahead of Christmas 2006. In 2015, the Dendy Cinemas chain proposed an expansion to the cinemas complex in Canberra that would result in around 100 fewer carparks and six new cinemas.

=== Southport ===
Dendy Southport, located in Southport on the Gold Coast, Queensland, opened in 2022 within the newly built Queen Street Village precinct.

== Current locations ==
As of January 2025, the Dendy website shows cinemas in Newtown, Sydney; Canberra; Southport, Gold Coast; and in Brisbane, at Coorparoo, Portside, and the Dendy Powerhouse, an outdoor cinema at New Farm Park.

Dendy Cinema Pty Ltd is registered in New South Wales, first dated June 2000.

== Dendy Direct ==
In 2014, Dendy Cinemas launched an online movie store, Dendy Direct, featuring movies to rent or buy. Dendy Direct was shut down on 14 May 2018 amid pressure from other competing streaming services such as Netflix and Stan.

== See also ==
- Dendy Award, an award sponsored by Dendy at the Sydney Film Festival
