= The Resurrection of the Christ: Part One =

- Teaser poster with the original release date
- Directed by: Mel Gibson
- Screenplay by: Mel Gibson; Randall Wallace; Chris Gibson; Alan Munro
- Story by: Mel Gibson; Randall Wallace
- Based on: Canonical Gospels
- Produced by: Mel Gibson; Bruce Davey
- Starring: Jaakko Ohtonen; Mariela Garriga; Pier Luigi Pasino; Kasia Smutniak; Sara Serraiocco; Riccardo Scamarcio; Rupert Everett; Leonardo Maltese; Marcello Fonte; Alessandro Sperduti
- Cinematography: Robrecht Heyvaert
- Edited by: John Gilbert
- Production company: Icon Productions
- Distributed by: Lionsgate
- Release date: May 6, 2027
- Country: United States
- Language: English
- Budget: $100 million

The Resurrection of the Christ: Part One is an upcoming American epic biblical drama film directed by Mel Gibson from a script he co-wrote with Randall Wallace, and based on the story he wrote with his brother Chris Gibson and Wallace. Gibson also serves as producer alongside Bruce Davey. It is the second installment in a trilogy and the sequel to The Passion of the Christ (2004). The film features a new cast, starring Jaakko Ohtonen as Jesus and Mariela Garriga as Mary Magdalene.

== Premise ==
The film continues to present the New Testament narrative following the Passion of Jesus covered in the first part of this trilogy, using a non-linear presentation of biblical narratives related to the Resurrection. Parts One and Two are also to include segments dealing with the visualization of Hell and the Rebellion of Satan.

== Cast ==
- Jaakko Ohtonen as Jesus
- Mariela Garriga as Mary Magdalene
- Pier Luigi Pasino as Peter
- Kasia Smutniak as Mary, mother of Jesus
- Sara Serraiocco as Mary Heli
- Riccardo Scamarcio as Pontius Pilate
- Gabriele Rollo as John
- Francesco Di Leva as Apostle
- Lorenzo James Henrie as Judas Thaddeus
- Leonardo Maltese
- Lorenzo Richelmy as King David
- Alessandro Sperduti
- Rupert Everett as Abraham
- Marcello Fonte
- Liliana Mele as Mary Salome
- Vincenzo Nemolato as Matthew
- Andrea Misuraca as King Solomon
- Lorenzo de Moor as Andrew
- Marco Pancrazi as Tomb Guard
- Aleksandros Memetaj as Simon
- Patrizio Pelizzi as Roman soldier
- Emma Riotta as Joanna
- Mario Sagone as Philip
- Darko Peric

== Production ==
=== Development ===
In 2016, writer Randall Wallace stated that he and Mel Gibson had begun work on a sequel to The Passion of the Christ (2004) which would focus on the resurrection of Jesus and the events surrounding the resurrection. In 2018, Jim Caviezel said that Gibson had sent him the third draft of the screenplay, announcing his intentions to reprise his role as Jesus Christ. In 2020, Caviezel said that it would be titled The Passion of the Christ: Resurrection and predicted "It's going to be the biggest film in world history".

In 2023, Gibson stated the sequel was "coming soon", and that he had two versions of the script that he was working on, saying "one of them is a very structured and very strong script and kind of more what one should expect and the other is like an acid trip". In September 2024, while promoting Monster Summer (2024), Gibson addressed concerns on how he would make believable that only three days have passed in-universe in the film given that more than 20 years have passed since the original film was made. Gibson originally planned to use de-aging technology to solve the issue, as Caviezel and other actors such as Maia Morgenstern as Mary, Monica Bellucci as Mary Magdalene, and Francesco De Vito as Saint Peter would either have to be de-aged or recast, while John the Apostle would have to be recast because Christo Jivkov died in 2023. In January 2025, Gibson revealed that the title of the film was The Resurrection of the Christ. In April 2025, Caviezel said that he would reprise his role as Jesus in the sequel and would be de-aged with the same modern technology employed in The Irishman (2019) because he needed to look three days older than how old he was in the original film, a preparation for which Caviezel said he was asking Jesus to work through him. Gibson has teased the film as an "acid trip", as it explores Christ's time exploring Hell, dealing with fallen angels and the Harrowing of Hell.

=== Casting ===
By October 2025, when the film was in pre-production however, it was reported that Caviezel and Bellucci had exited the film, with their roles being recast. Days later, it was announced that the entire cast of the original movie would be replaced due to scheduling conflicts and the cost of using de-aging CGI special effects. Finnish actor Jaakko Ohtonen was cast as Jesus, replacing Caviezel; Mariela Garriga as Mary Magdalene, replacing Bellucci; Kasia Smutniak as Mary (mother of Jesus), replacing Maia Morgenstern; Pier Luigi Pasino as Peter, replacing Francesco De Vito; and Riccardo Scamarcio as Pontius Pilate, replacing Hristo Naumov Shopov; while Rupert Everett was cast in a then-undisclosed role. Ohtonen's casting in place of Caviezel sparked criticism; separately, Smutniak's support for the 2020–21 Strajk Kobiet protests against Poland's criminalization of almost all abortions meant that some Polish conservatives criticized her being cast as the Virgin Mary and began a campaign calling on Gibson to find a different actress for the role. In an interview on Hang Out with Sean Hannity, Caviezel also mentioned that he had spent years preparing to return to his iconic role, but that scheduling conflicts related to the film Ghost Soldier complicated the situation.

=== Filming ===
Principal photography began on October 6, 2025. The film was shot entirely at Cinecittà Studios in Rome; and was completed simultaneously with its sequel. It was previously reported to begin in early 2025. Production continued with the movie's new cast at Cinecittà Studios, while additional photography took place mainly in Gravina in Puglia, and also Matera, Ginosa, Torre Guaceto, Brindisi and Craco. In October 2025, the movie's production budget was announced to be $100 million.

Filming wrapped on April 30, 2026.

== Release ==
In May 2025, Lionsgate acquired distribution rights to the film.

The Resurrection of the Christ: Part One is scheduled to be released on Ascension Day in the United States on May 6, 2027. It was previously scheduled to release on March 26, 2027.

== Sequel ==
A sequel, titled The Resurrection of the Christ: Part Two, is set for May 25, 2028.
