= The Resurrection of the Christ: Part Two =

- Teaser poster with the original release date
- Directed by: Mel Gibson
- Screenplay by: Mel Gibson; Randall Wallace; Chris Gibson; Alan Munro
- Story by: Mel Gibson; Randall Wallace
- Based on: Canonical Gospels
- Produced by: Mel Gibson; Bruce Davey
- Starring: Jaakko Ohtonen; Mariela Garriga; Pier Luigi Pasino; Kasia Smutniak; Sara Serraiocco; Riccardo Scamarcio; Rupert Everett; Eduardo Scarpetta; Lorenzo Richelmy; Andrea Scarduzio; Marcello Fonte; Lorenzo de Moor; Vincenzo Nemolato; Alessandro Cremona; Matteo Franco; Andrea Misuraca; Patrizio Pelizzi; Emma Riotta; Marco Pancrazi
- Cinematography: Robrecht Heyvaert
- Edited by: John Gilbert
- Production company: Icon Productions
- Distributed by: Lionsgate
- Release date: May 25, 2028
- Country: United States
- Language: English
- Budget: $100 million

The Resurrection of the Christ: Part Two is an upcoming American epic biblical drama film co-written, produced, and directed by Mel Gibson from a script he co-wrote with Randall Wallace, and based on the story he wrote with his brother Donal Gibson and Wallace. It serves as the third and final film in a trilogy from the filmmaker, and is intended to be a direct 2028 sequel to the 2027 film The Resurrection of the Christ: Part One.

== Premise ==
The film continues to present the New Testament narrative following the Passion of Jesus covered in the first part of this trilogy, using a non-linear presentation of biblical narratives related to the Resurrection. Parts One and Two are also to include segments dealing with the visualization of Hell and the Rebellion of Satan.

== Cast ==
- Jaakko Ohtonen as Jesus
- Mariela Garriga as Mary Magdalene
- Pier Luigi Pasino as Peter
- Kasia Smutniak as Mary, mother of Jesus
- Riccardo Scamarcio as Pontius Pilate
- Rupert Everett as Abraham
- Andrea Misuraca as King Solomon
- Lorenzo Richelmy as King David
- Patrizio Pelizzi as Roman Soldier
- Vincenzo Nemolato as Apostle Matthew
- Emma Riotta as Joanna
- Liliana Mele as Mary Salome
- Alessandro Cremona as Noah
- Vincent Papa as Inn Keeper
- Marcello Fonte as Apostle
- Marco Pancrazi as Tomb Guard
- Francesco Di Leva as Apostle
- Leonardo Maltese
- Alessandro Sperduti as Apostle
- Mario Sagone as Apostle Philip

== Production ==
In August 2025, it was reported that The Resurrection of the Christ would be split into two parts, with the first installment releasing in March 2027. By October, Jim Caviezel and Monica Bellucci had exited the film, with their roles as Jesus Christ and Mary Magdalene currently being recast. Days later, it was announced that the entire cast of the original movie would be replaced due to the cost of using de-aging CGI special effects. Finnish actor Jaakko Ohtonen was cast as Jesus, replacing Caviezel; Mariela Garriga as Mary Magdalene, replacing Belucci; Kasia Smutniak as Mary (mother of Jesus), replacing Maia Morgenstern; Pier Luigi Pasino as Peter, replacing Francesco De Vito; and Riccardo Scamarcio as Pontius Pilate, replacing Hristo Naumov Shopov; while Rupert Everett was cast in a then-undisclosed role.

=== Filming ===
Principal photography began on October 6, 2025. The film was shot entirely at Cinecittà Studios in Rome; and was completed simultaneously with Part One.

Filming wrapped on April 30, 2026.

== Release ==
The Resurrection of the Christ: Part Two is scheduled to be released on Ascension Day in the United States on May 25, 2028. It was previously scheduled to release May 6, 2027.
