= Get the Gringo =

- Promo art
- Directed by: Adrian Grunberg
- Written by: Mel Gibson; Stacy Perskie; Adrian Grunberg
- Produced by: Mel Gibson; Bruce Davey; Stacy Perskie
- Starring: Mel Gibson; Kevin Hernandez
- Cinematography: Benoît Debie
- Edited by: Steven Rosenblum
- Music by: Antonio Pinto
- Production companies: Icon Productions; Airborne Productions
- Distributed by: 20th Century Fox Home Entertainment
- Release date: May 1, 2012
- Running time: 93 minutes
- Country: United States
- Languages: English; Spanish
- Budget: $20 million
- Box office: $8.8 million

Get the Gringo (also known as How I Spent My Summer Vacation) is a 2012 American action film directed by Adrian Grunberg, who co-wrote the film with Mel Gibson, who starred in the film.

== Plot ==
The film opens with a getaway driver and his wounded accomplice dressed as clowns fleeing from American Border Patrol toward the Mexican border. The driver crashes through the border fence, whereupon he is arrested by corrupt Mexican police officers Vasquez and Romero. When they find over $2 million in the back seat of the car, they imprison him in El Pueblito prison under false charges, keep the cash for themselves, and cremate his dead accomplice. As one of the only Americans incarcerated there, the driver becomes known as "the Gringo".

El Pueblito proves surprising, operating more like a small ghetto than a prison. The Gringo quickly manages to work out the prison's criminal hierarchy and engages in petty thefts and robberies from some of the prison's less reputable businesses. One of these thefts is witnessed by an unnamed kid who is living with his incarcerated mother and is protected by the prison's criminals. Curious, the Gringo presses him to explain why the criminals protect him, but the Kid refuses.

Later, the Gringo stops the Kid from an ill-fated assassination attempt on Javi, leader of the crime family that runs El Pueblito. After an argument, he learns why the Kid is protected: Javi has a failing liver, and the Kid is the only viable match; Javi has already killed the Kid's father and harvested his liver. The Gringo vows to stop the transplant from happening and to help kill Javi. Meanwhile, the Gringo attracts the attention of a United States Consulate employee, who easily identifies him as a career criminal. Unconcerned, the Gringo and the Kid work towards bringing down Javi, and the Gringo grows closer to the Kid's mother.

The Gringo ingratiates himself to Javi by saving Javi's brother, Caracas, and revealing the money stolen by Vasquez and Romero. Thugs working for criminal boss Frank Fowler, from whom the Gringo stole the money, have located Vasquez and Romero. The thugs are torturing the cops to find the location of an additional missing $2 million. Javi's men show up, kill everyone, and take the money, enraging Fowler, who knows Javi. With the aid of the consulate employee, Fowler sends assassins into El Pueblito to kill Javi and the Gringo.

The shootout that follows results in the Mexican authorities planning a raid on the prison. Knowing time is short, Javi hires the Gringo to kill Fowler and sets up an immediate transplant operation. In the US, the Gringo, now out of prison, lures Fowler out of hiding by arranging a meeting between him and shipping magnate Thomas Kaufmann. The Gringo pretends he is his ex-partner, Reginald T. Barnes, who had betrayed him, and sets up a meeting between Kaufmann and Fowler, during which he kills Fowler. When the Gringo locates the Consulate employee, he learns about the imminent transplant operation and rushes to save the Kid, who has unsuccessfully attempted to stab himself in the liver.

Using the Consulate employee's credentials, the Gringo enters the prison during their raid and interrupts Javi's liver transplant surgery. Threatening to kill Javi, the Gringo forces Caracas to retrieve the Kid's mother, who Javi has tortured. Caracas returns with two thugs, but the Gringo kills them both. A nurse helps the Gringo by pretending to capture him. When Caracas relaxes, the Gringo shoots him. They grab the money, and the nurse helps them escape from the prison in an ambulance.

In the epilogue, the Gringo recovers the additional missing $2 million hidden in the escape car held in the impound lot, and the Gringo, the Kid, and his mother retire to an idyllic beach. Kaufmann hires two thugs who exact retribution on the real Reginald Barnes, killing him.

== Cast ==
- Mel Gibson as Richard "The Gringo" Johnson
- Kevin Balmore Hernandez as Kid
- Dolores Heredia as Kid's Mom
- Daniel Giménez Cacho as Javier "Javi" Huerta
- Jesús Ochoa as "Caracas" Huerta
- Roberto Sosa as "Carnal"
- Tenoch Huerta as Carlos
- Peter Gerety as Embassy Guy
- Peter Stormare as Frank Fowler
- Bob Gunton as Warren Kaufmann
- Scott Cohen as Jackson
- Patrick Bauchau as Surgeon
- Fernando Becerril as Prison Director
- Mayra Serbulo as Nurse
- Stephanie Lemelin as Frank's Lawyer's Secretary
- Tom Schanley as Gregor
- Mario Zaragoza as Officer Vazquez
- Dean Norris as Officer Bill

== Production ==
The script was written by Mel Gibson, Stacy Perskie and Adrian Grunberg. The film is directed by Adrian Grunberg, who worked as a first assistant director with Gibson on Apocalypto. The film was produced by Gibson, Bruce Davey and Stacy Perskie. Executive producers included Mark Gooder, Vicki Christianson, Ann Ruark, Len Blavatnik. Filming began in March 2010 in San Diego, Brownsville, Texas, and Veracruz, Mexico. Most of the filming took place at the Ignacio Allende Prison. Benoît Debie was the cinematographer on the film.

== Release ==
The film's theatrical release began in Israel in March 2012 before reaching 22 other countries over the next six months. In the UK, the film was released under its original (working) title of How I Spent My Summer Vacation. As of the July, the film had taken in $4.5 million at the box office. The film's US premiere coincided with a ten-city, same-day tour with Mel Gibson appearing at Austin's Alamo Drafthouse Cinema with co-star Kevin Hernandez and director Adrian Grunberg on April 18, 2012. The other nine cities screened the film and received a satellite feed of the Q&A.

The film did not have a regular US theatrical release, instead appearing on video on demand (VOD). At the event, Gibson said of the VOD release, "We're just in a different era. Many people just like to see things in their homes....I think it's the future." The film was first publicly released exclusively through video-on-demand services in the United States.

In Icon's deal with Fox, Get the Gringo did have an exclusive preview window on DirecTV May 1 before it was released on other VOD services a month later. Its release date on Blu-ray Disc was set as July 17, 2012, by 20th Century Fox Home Entertainment in the US.

== Reception ==
Get the Gringo received largely positive reviews. On Rotten Tomatoes, a review aggregator website, the film received positive reviews by 82% of the 56 surveyed critics; the average rating is 6.3/10. The website's consensus reads: "Energetic and hard-hitting, Get the Gringo plays squarely to its lead actor's strengths as a skilled portrayer of men put through physical and emotional hell." Metacritic, which uses a weighted average, assigned the film a score of 60 out of 100, based on 10 critics, indicating "mixed or average" reviews.

In a positive review, Philip French of The Guardian wrote that Gibson "returns here to doing what he does best, playing a funny, psychopathic, sharp-thinking outsider". Tom Huddleston of Time Out London rated the film three out of five stars and called it "superbly constructed, pithily scripted, and absurdly entertaining" despite the racist stereotypes and viciousness.

Todd McCarthy of The Hollywood Reporter likened the film to 1970s exploitation films, such as Bring Me the Head of Alfredo Garcia, composed of efficient and effective scenes. Variety's Peter Debruge also compared the film to Sam Peckinpah's films and stated that the film is an ideal showcase for director Grunberg.

== See also ==
- Mel Gibson filmography
