= Push (2009 film) =

2009 film by Paul McGuigan

- Theatrical release poster
- Directed by: Paul McGuigan
- Written by: David Bourla
- Produced by: Bruce Davey; William Vince; Glenn Williamson
- Starring: Chris Evans; Dakota Fanning; Camilla Belle; Cliff Curtis; Djimon Hounsou
- Cinematography: Peter Sova
- Edited by: Nicolas Trembasiewicz
- Music by: Neil Davidge
- Production companies: Summit Entertainment; Icon Productions; Infinity Features Entertainment, Inc.
- Distributed by: Summit Entertainment
- Release date: February 6, 2009
- Running time: 111 minutes
- Country: United States
- Language: English
- Budget: $38 million
- Box office: $48.9 million

Push is a 2009 American science fiction action-thriller film starring Chris Evans, Dakota Fanning, Camilla Belle, and Djimon Hounsou. Directed by Paul McGuigan, the film centers on people with superhuman abilities who band together to take down a government agency that is using a dangerous drug to enhance their powers in the hope of creating an army of super soldiers. The film was released in the United States on February 6, 2009, by Summit Entertainment and Icon Productions. It grossed $48.9 million, and the critical reception was mostly negative.

== Plot ==
Since 1945, various countries have set up Divisions to track, categorize, and experiment on people with psychic abilities to turn them into soldiers. 10 years ago, two Movers, Jonah Gant and his young son Nick, were pursued by the U.S. Division.

Jonah instructs Nick to help a girl who gives him a flower in the future. A team led by Division agent Henry Carver, a Pusher, kills Jonah, but Nick escapes.

In the present, the U.S. Division has developed a drug that can boost psychic abilities, but all test subjects died until Pusher Kira Hudson/Hollis successfully adapted to it. She steals a syringe of the drug and flees, aided by another woman in the facility. Carver orders the Division to capture Kira and retrieve the syringe.

Meanwhile, Nick has moved to Hong Kong, a common hiding place for psychics. Nick's powers are blunted from rare usage, and he incurs debt when his powers fail to help him cheat in gambling. Division Sniffers Mack and Holden visit Nick to look for Kira, but find no trace.

Nick is visited immediately after by Cassie Holmes, a 13-year-old moody teenage Watcher, who also wants him to help her find Kira. At a market, they are confronted by Triads, who are also looking for Kira.

The Triads Bleeders wound Nick, so Cassie takes him to a traditional healer. Only to be surprised by a favor from Stitch Teresa Stowe, who arrives to heal him due to having known Cassie's mother. Nick realizes Cassie is the girl he is supposed to help. Mack and Holden capture Kira in Hong Kong, but she soon escapes after Pushing Mack to kill Holden. Carver dismisses Mack, but he insists on continuing, so Carver Pushes him to kill himself.

Nick and Cassie track down Kira with the assistance of Shifter Hook Waters and Sniffer Emily Wu. Nick and Cassie are surprised to learn they were looking for someone Nick has a past with, but Kira knew she would encounter Nick. Kira has hidden the syringe and had Wiper Wo Chiang erase her memory of its location, protecting it from Division agents.

Nick recruits Shadow Pinky Stein to hide Kira from the Division. Nick and Kira, who are former lovers, reconcile and kiss. He tracks down Carver with Emily's assistance and attempts an ambush. Carver reveals that Kira will eventually die without more of the drug, which only he has. His right-hand man, Victor Budarin, defeats Nick. However, Cassie convinces Carver to spare Nick, then finds a key in Kira's shoe that unlocks the locker containing the syringe.

Aided by Cassie, Nick plans and writes instructions for his allies, then has his memory of them erased by Wo Chiang. As part of the plan, Hook creates a duplicate of the syringe and suitcase, while Pinky delivers Kira to Carver. Teresa betrays Nick to the Triad, passing Hook's duplicate syringe to them, before Nick defeats her.

Carver convinces Kira that she was a Division agent and that her relationship with Nick was a cover. Cassie is ambushed by the Triad's Pop Girl, only for Wo Chiang to appear and erase Pop Girl's memory per Nick's instructions.

Nick visits Carver to trade the syringe for Kira, only to discover she had been brainwashed and is restrained. Kira, Carver, and Victor visit a construction site to retrieve the syringe, but the Triad ambushes them. This leads to a battle that kills many Triad members and inadvertently frees Nick, who also joins the battle. Victor is killed by the triad leader, whom Nick defeats. Nick seizes the syringe and injects himself with it. Believing the drug will kill him, Carver leaves with Kira.

After they leave, Cassie appears, revealing that Nick is alive, as he used a decoy syringe. They retrieve the real syringe and discuss using it to free Cassie's Watcher mother, Elizabeth/Sarah Frank, from the Division, who hatched the entire plan to take down the Division before Cassie was born.

Later, Kira discovers her unopened envelope, which contains a photograph proving her relationship with Nick was real, and Carver is using her, with the instruction to kill Carver. Kira Pushes Carver to shoot himself.

== Cast ==
- Chris Evans as Nick Gant, an untrained Mover hiding in Hong Kong from the Division. As a child, he witnessed his father being murdered by Agent Carver and has difficulty controlling his power.
  - Colin Ford as Young Nick Gant
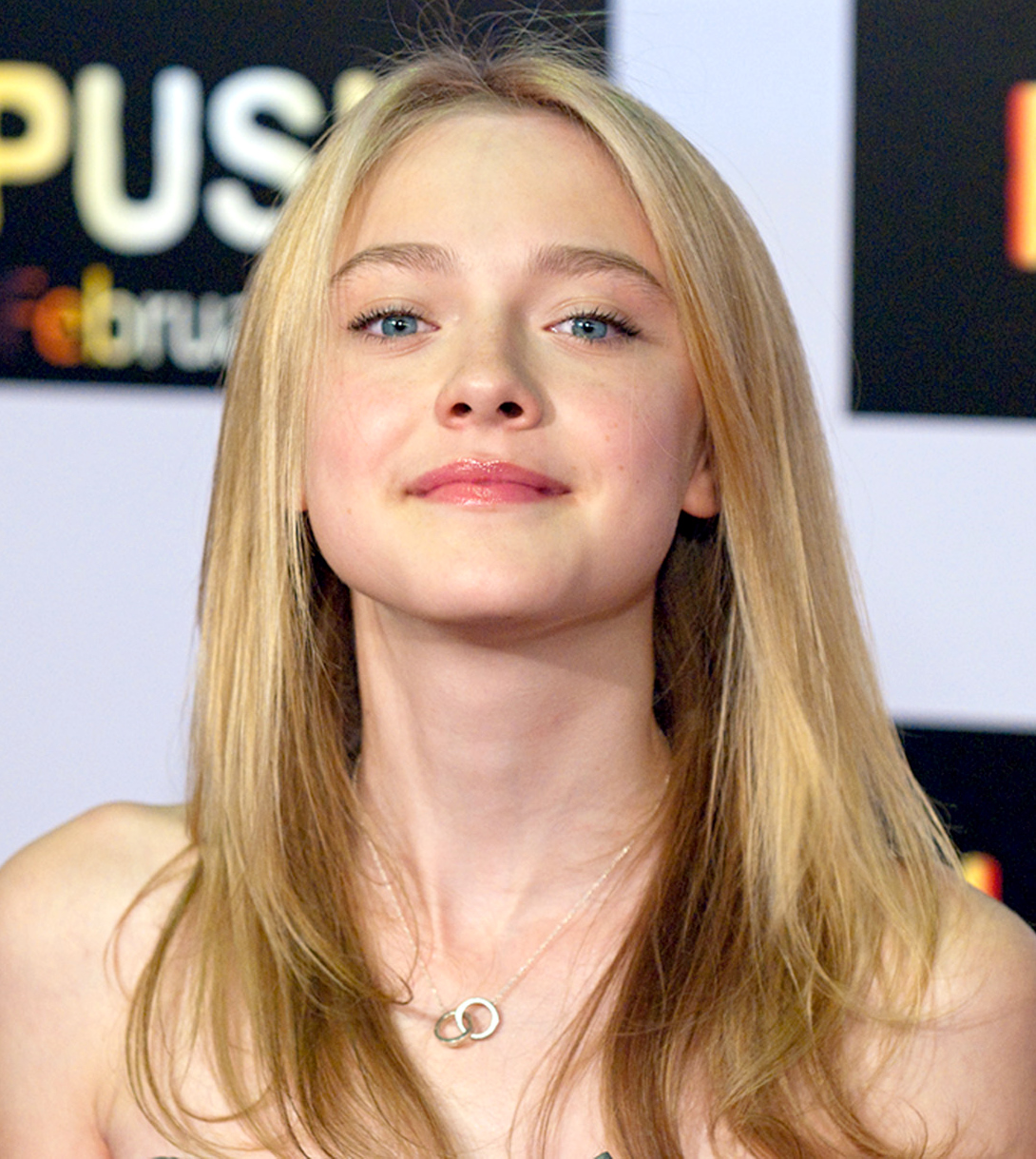
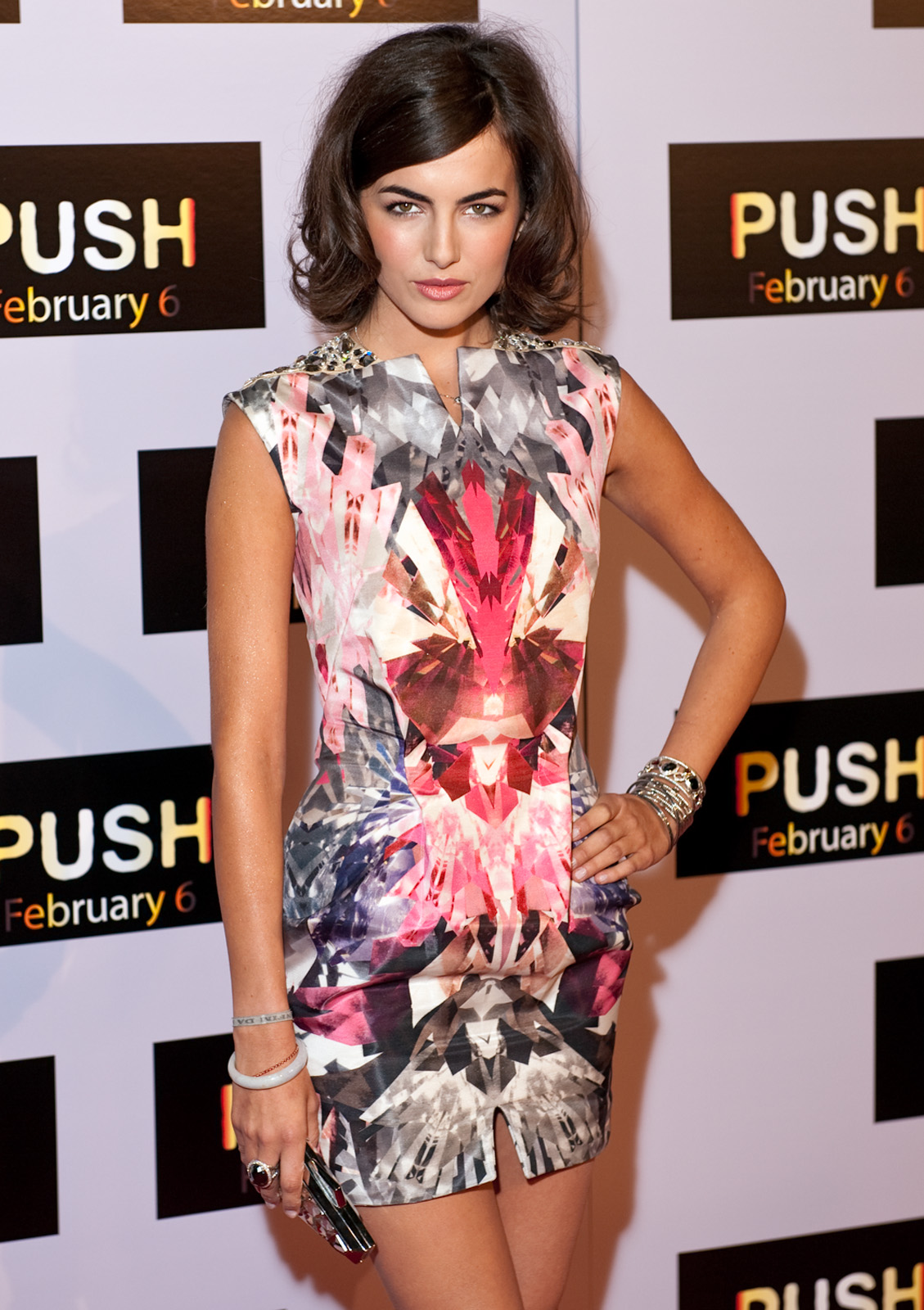
Dakota Fanning (left) and Camilla Belle at the film's premiere.
- Dakota Fanning as Cassie Holmes, a 13-year-old Watcher and the daughter of the most powerful Watcher the Division has encountered. Her abilities are not fully developed, and she is sometimes confused by the premonitions she draws.
  - Cassie's mother, Elizabeth / Sarah Frank (uncredited); a powerful Watcher imprisoned and drugged by the Division to prevent her from using her powers against them.
- Camilla Belle as Kira Hudson / Hollis, a high-level Pusher escapee from the Division. The only Division patient to have survived experimentation.
- Djimon Hounsou as Division Agent Henry Carver, a powerful Pusher who killed Nick's father and is tasked to recapture Kira.
- Joel Gretsch as Jonah Gant, Nick's father. An advanced Mover was killed for refusing to join the Division.
- Ming-Na Wen as Emily Wu, a Sniffer who helps Nick and Cassie find Kira.
- Cliff Curtis as "Hook" Waters, a former Division Shifter who believes the Division murdered his wife.
- Nate Mooney as "Pinky" Stein, a Shadow who hides Kira. He is missing his pinky finger.
- Corey Stoll as Sniffer Agent Mack
- Scott Michael Campbell as Sniffer Agent Holden
- Neil Jackson as Victor Budarin, an advanced Mover and Carver's right-hand man.
- Maggie Siff as Teresa Stowe, a Stitch who heals Nick.
- Paul Che as Wo Chiang, a Wiper living on a boat.
- Xiao Lu Li as Pop Girl, a Triad Watcher who draws her visions and tracks Nick and Cassie.
- Kwan Fung Chi and Jacky Heung as Pop Boys, Triad Bleeders.
- Haruhiko Yamanouchi as Pop Father, Triad Bleeder, and father to the Pop siblings.

== Reception ==
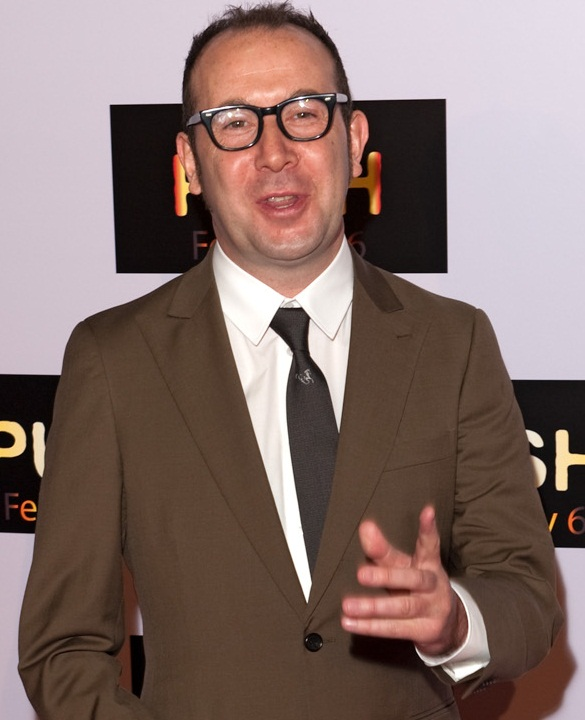
Director Paul McGuigan at the film's premiere

=== Box office ===
On its opening weekend, the film opened No. 6, grossing $10,079,109 in 2,313 theaters with a $4,358 average. The film grossed $48,858,618 worldwide, and $16,285,488 in DVD sales in the US alone making $65,157,106 (not including worldwide DVD sales) surpassing its budget cost of $38 million by over $27 million.

=== Critical response ===
On review aggregator Rotten Tomatoes, the film has an approval rating of 23% based on 128 reviews and a rating average of 4.3/10. The site's critical consensus reads, "The sci-fi thriller Push is visually flashy but hyperkinetic and convoluted." On Metacritic, it has a weighted average score of 36 out of 100, based on 21 critics, indicating "generally unfavorable" reviews.

Roger Ebert of the Chicago Sun-Times gave the film one and a half stars out of four, stating: "Push" has vibrant cinematography and decent acting, but I'm blasted if I know what it's about." Robert Koehler of Variety called the film "a confused jumble of parts in search of a whole", and said it "plays like a mix-tape sample of scenes from Heroes, Fringe, Alias and The X-Files." Michael Rechtshaffen of The Hollywood Reporter said "While the concept of corralling assorted [Movers, Watchers, and Pushers] and placing them against a stylish Asian backdrop is intriguing, the picture seldom rises to the occasion."

Tasha Robinson of The A.V. Club was more positive, giving it a B+: "Superhero fans will likely be into Push just for the cool-factor of watching embattled heroes and villains in a tense war of wits, wills, and skills. That broader audience is less likely to come along for the ride, but this particular gateway drug at least has ambition and brains going for it, as well as the usual spastic style."

=== Home media ===
Push was released on DVD and Blu-ray on July 7, 2009. The DVD included deleted scenes, a commentary, and a 'making of' featurette. Wal-Mart released the film as a double-feature DVD with Knowing. Push was released on 4K UHD Blu-Ray on April 10, 2018.

== Comic ==
Wildstorm, an imprint of DC Comics, published a comic book mini-series that acts as a prequel to the film. It was written by Marc Bernardin and Adam Freeman (who wrote The Highwaymen for Wildstorm) and Bruno Redondo supplied the art. Issues were published from January 2009 and February 2009, and a softcover collection (ISBN 978-1401224929) was published in September 2009.

== See also ==
- Stargate Project, the real U.S. Federal Government project to investigate psychic phenomena, was used as a basis for the film.
- Firestarter, a 1984 film (based on the Stephen King novel of the same name) with a similar plot.
- Scanners, a 1981 film written and directed by David Cronenberg which also features characters with psychic abilities.
