= Liliana Mele =

Italian-Ethiopian actress and model

- Liliana Mele in 2026
- Born: Liliana Mele; 1984 (age 41–42); Gondar, Ethiopia
- Occupations: Actress; model

Liliana Mele is an Italian-Ethiopian actress and model.

== Biography ==
Born to an Ethiopian mother and an Italian father, Liliana Mele spends her early childhood between Sudan and Ethiopia before moving to Italy at the age of six. At fourteen, she moves back to Addis Ababa with her family, where she begins to cultivate her passion for acting by attending the "Airbag Terzo Millennio" theater workshop organized by the Italian Cultural Institute for three years. In 2000 she won the pre-selection of Miss Italia nel Mondo, obtaining the title of Miss Ethiopia, which allowed her to return to Italy for the competition's final, where she ranked in fourth place.

She made her film debut in 2004 on the set of Carlo Verdone in Love Is Eternal While It Lasts. In 2005 she played the role of Amina, one of the protagonists of the television series Gente di mare, broadcast on Rai 1 for two seasons. She was also part of the regular cast of the television series Rome, an international drama consisting of two seasons.

In 2009 she starred alongside Sergio Castellitto and Riccardo Scamarcio in an episode of the film Italians directed by Giovanni Veronesi. In 2011 she played the role of Sinan in The Beautiful Adventure of Antonio Franconi by Luca Verdone with Massimo Ranieri and Sonia Aquino. Between 2012 and 2015, she played various roles in various television episodes, including Distretto di Polizia, The Captain, Laura's Choice, Red Valentine's Day, For the Love of my People, and Don Matteo 10.

Later, she focuses on her studies and completes a research thesis on theater in Ethiopia during the time of Haile Selassie, as part of her Master's degree in Literature and Philosophy at the Sapienza University of Rome. She then moves to Los Angeles to pursue a master's program at the prestigious Lee Strasberg Theatre and Film Institute.

She subsequently devoted a period to study, graduating in performing arts and sciences and earning a master's degree in Los Angeles at the prestigious acting school Lee Strasberg Theatre and Film Institute. In 2017 she worked alongside Giuseppe Fiorello, Corrado Fortuna and Daniela Marra in the film. All the world is a country, directed by Giulio Manfredonia. From 2021 to 2023, she becomes part of the cast of the highly successful series Mare fuori, also known internationally as The Sea Beyond, playing the role of Latifah. During the same period, she is directed by Michele Placido in Presto sarà domani. In 2024, she plays Mara Silvestri in the second season of the Italian-British series Signora Volpe, alongside Emily Fox and Tara Fitzgerald.

In 2025, she joins the main cast of The Resurrection of the Christ, parts 1 and 2, a highly anticipated new film by Mel Gibson, set to be released on 6 May 2027 and 25 May 2028. Currently, she is working on a series for Rai alongside Rocco Papaleo.

== Filmography ==
=== Cinema ===
- Love is eternal while it lasts, directed by Carlo Verdone (2004)
- Italians, directed by Giovanni Veronesi (2009)
- On & Off, directed by Mario Marasco (2009)
- The wonderful adventure of Antonio Franconi, directed by Luca Verdone (2011)
- Tutto tutto niente niente, directed by Giulio Manfredonia (2012)
- Cetto c'è, senzadubbiamente, directed by Giulio Manfredonia (2019)
- The Resurrection of the Christ, directed by Mel Gibson (2026)

=== Television ===
- District of Police (fifth season), directed by Lucio Gaudino (2005)
- Rome, directed by Steve Shill (2005)
- Seafarers (seasons 1–2), directed by Alfredo Peyretti, Vittorio De Sisti, Franco Angeli (2005-2007)
- Rome (second season), directed by Steve Shill (2007)
- The Captain (second season), directed by Vittorio Sindoni (2008)
- Laura's Choice, directed by Alessandro Piva (2009)
- Rosso San Valentino, directed by Fabrizio Costa (2012)
- For the Love of My People, directed by Antonio Frazzi (2013)
- Don Matteo (tenth season), directed by Monica Vullo (2015)
- All the World Is a Country, directed by Giulio Manfredonia (2018)
- L'isola di Pietro (second season), directed by Luca Brignone and Giulio Manfredonia (2018)
- The Sea Beyond (second season), directed by Milena Cocozza and Ivan Silvestrini, 3 episodes (2021)
- The Sea Beyond (third season), directed by Ivan Silvestrini, 6 episodes (2023)

=== Shorts ===
- What good boys, directed by Hedy Krissane (2012)
- Wake up, directed by Evaristus Ogbechie (2018)

=== Advertising ===
- Telecom Gandhi Speech directed by Spike Lee and Alessandro D'Alatri (2008)
- Advertising campaign for Monte dei Paschi di Siena (2011)
- Advertisement Fao (2012)
- Vraylar America, directed by M. Haussman
- Super Dry Beer Japan (2019)

=== Dubbing ===
- Bakhita. The African Saint, directed by Giacomo Campiotti (2008)
- Black and White, directed by Cristina Comencini (2008)

=== Video clips ===
- I can't resist by Irene Grandi, (2005)
- Mun up by Cosma Brussani, (2012)

== Theater ==
- Love, directed by Leonardo Ferrari Dearest (2013)
- Cleopatra, directed by Johannes Bramante (2015)
- I don't know, you know, what do they know?, directed by Vito Ostuni (2016)
- Nero Cuore, directed by Giorgio Crisafi (2019)

== Acknowledgments ==
- Youth Oscar – delivered in the Campidoglio (2007)
