= Pier Luigi Pasino =

Italian actor (born 1981)

- Born: 1981 (age 44–45); Alessandria, Italy
- Occupation: Actor
- Years active: 2005–present
- Children: 2

Pier Luigi Pasino (born 1981) is an Italian actor.

== Biography ==
Pasino was born in Alessandria, where he attended the Liceo Scientifico Galileo Galilei. He was in a punk rock band before becoming an actor.

He began auditioning for drama schools at the age of 21. He trained at the Teatro Stabile in Genoa, from which he graduated in 2005. In 2023, he began playing Enrico Poët in the Netflix series The Law According to Lidia Poët. The following year, he and Matilda De Angelis, who plays Lidia Poët, co-wrote and performed a single titled "Lidia" for the series.

=== Personal life ===
Pasino has a wife, Camilla, and two daughters.

== Filmography ==
=== Film ===
Key
†	Denotes films that have not yet been released

Year	Title	Role	Notes	Ref.
2005	Texas	Tranquillo		
2021	Lovely Boy	Lorenzo		
2021	On Our Watch	Maître		
2027	The Resurrection of the Christ: Part One †	Peter	Post-production	
2028	The Resurrection of the Christ: Part Two †	Peter	Post-production	

=== Television ===
Year	Title	Role	Notes	Ref.
2023–2026	The Law According to Lidia Poët	Enrico Poët	18 episodes	
2024	Mameli - Il ragazzo che sognò l'Italia	Giuseppe Mazzini	3 episodes	

=== Web series ===
Year	Title	Role	Ref.
2012	#ByMySide	Teo	
