= Flight Risk (film) =

2025 film by Mel Gibson

- Theatrical release poster
- Directed by: Mel Gibson
- Written by: Jared Rosenberg
- Produced by: John Davis; John Fox; Bruce Davey; Mel Gibson
- Starring: Mark Wahlberg; Michelle Dockery; Topher Grace
- Cinematography: Johnny Derango
- Edited by: Steven Rosenblum
- Music by: Antônio Pinto
- Production companies: Icon Productions; Davis Entertainment Company; Hammerstone Studios
- Distributed by: Lionsgate
- Release date: January 24, 2025
- Running time: 91 minutes
- Country: United States
- Language: English
- Budget: $25 million
- Box office: $48.7 million

Flight Risk is a 2025 American action thriller film directed by Mel Gibson, and starring Mark Wahlberg, Michelle Dockery, and Topher Grace. Its plot follows a pilot (Wahlberg) transporting a Deputy U.S. Marshal (Dockery) and a fugitive (Grace) across the Alaskan wilderness, where the identities and intentions of those on board come into question.

Flight Risk was released in the United States by Lionsgate on January 24, 2025. The film received negative reviews from critics and grossed $48.7 million worldwide.

== Plot ==
U.S. Marshal Madolyn Harris arrests Winston, an accountant, while he is hiding in Alaska after turning informant against his former employer, the Moretti crime family. Madolyn charters a small airplane, a Cessna 208 Caravan, to take them to Anchorage so they can transfer to New York City, where she intends for Winston to testify against mobster Moretti. They are piloted by Daryl Booth, a Texan living in Alaska, who explains that the aircraft's radio and GPS are regularly out of order.

While shackled in the middle of the plane, Winston spots Daryl's pilot license under the seat in front of him, noticing that the photograph is a different person from "Daryl." He tries to warn Madolyn, who has a headset on and cannot hear him. After a brief conversation with Madolyn, "Daryl" mentions how she will go to Seattle after reaching Anchorage. He should not have known this, thus he reveals himself to be a hitman using Daryl's identity with orders to kill Winston. Madolyn manages to subdue him with a taser, and takes over piloting the plane.

Using her satellite phone, Madolyn explains the situation to her direct superior, Caroline Van Sant. Caroline tells her that Winston must be kept alive if Moretti is to be brought to justice. Winston had skimmed $1 million from the Moretti crime family during his time working for them. Caroline tells Madolyn that the real Daryl Booth had been tortured to death by "Daryl," and that she will arrange for another pilot to call her to help navigate them to safety.

Madolyn begins to grow suspicious of Caroline when "Daryl" knows information about her past that he should not have known—information that could only have come from the Marshals. Thus, Madolyn begins to suspect that Caroline is the leak to the mob. Madolyn then gets in touch with US Marshals Director Coleridge to explain her suspicions. However, Coleridge gives himself away as being on Moretti's payroll when he mentions his beach house, since Winston recognizes that a past request for payment came from an IP address in that city. This puts Caroline's life in danger, since Coleridge needs her to take the fall for any suspicions, lest he becomes a suspect.

"Daryl" wakes up, shackled to the overhead rack, and taunts Winston, promising to make him suffer, as well as to kill his mother, whose address he knows. He also reveals that Madolyn had been put on desk duty for several years after her neglect had caused the death of a witness in her custody during her last field mission; Madolyn permitted the witness to take a shower unsupervised, albeit handcuffed, when their motel room was firebombed by a cartel hitman, and Madolyn fled while forgetting the witness could not escape.

Hassan, a pilot on the ground in Anchorage, calls Madolyn and teaches her how to steer the plane; he also calms her and says they will go drinking and dancing when she lands safely. "Daryl" manages to free himself from his handcuffs and attacks the pair. He stabs Winston twice and begins to strangle Madolyn with the seatbelt. She is about to pass out when Winston removes the knife from his chest and cuts the belt, allowing Madolyn to shoot "Daryl" with a flare gun, incapacitating him at the back of the plane. When Coleridge calls Madolyn and tells her that Caroline has been killed in a car accident, she vows to bring him down alongside Moretti. A US Navy F/A-18 Hornet meets the plane to escort it to the airport.

With Winston now in dire need of medical attention, Hassan guides Madolyn into landing the plane as quickly as possible, which burns through their remaining fuel supply. On the approach, "Daryl" regains consciousness, almost degloves his hand in order to extract it from the handcuffs, and attacks again. He is shot by Madolyn and thrown from the plane when it crashes on the runway, where he is run over by a firetruck as Madolyn manages a successful crash landing.

Winston is rushed into an ambulance by the ground crew as Madolyn is greeted by Hassan. Madolyn notices that a suspicious-looking paramedic has entered the ambulance, and she quickly makes her way to the ambulance, finding that the fake paramedic is using a plastic bag to smother Winston. Madolyn shoots the paramedic before he can kill Winston. Madolyn picks up the paramedic's phone, revealing him as a hitman acting under orders from Coleridge, who is on the other end of the line. She tells Coleridge that he is finished, before sharing a caring moment with Winston, who smiles wanly.

== Cast ==
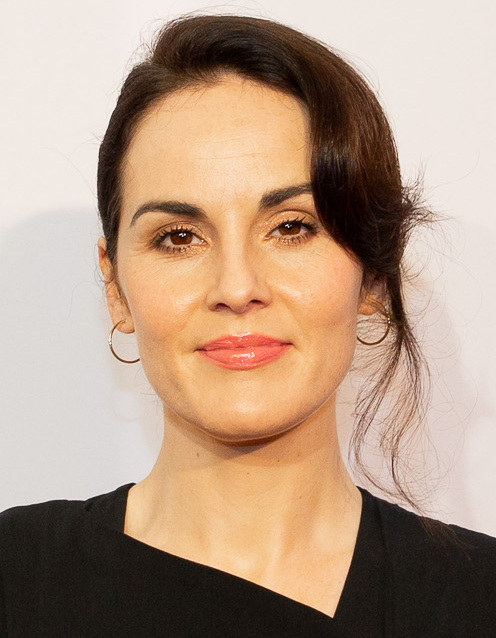
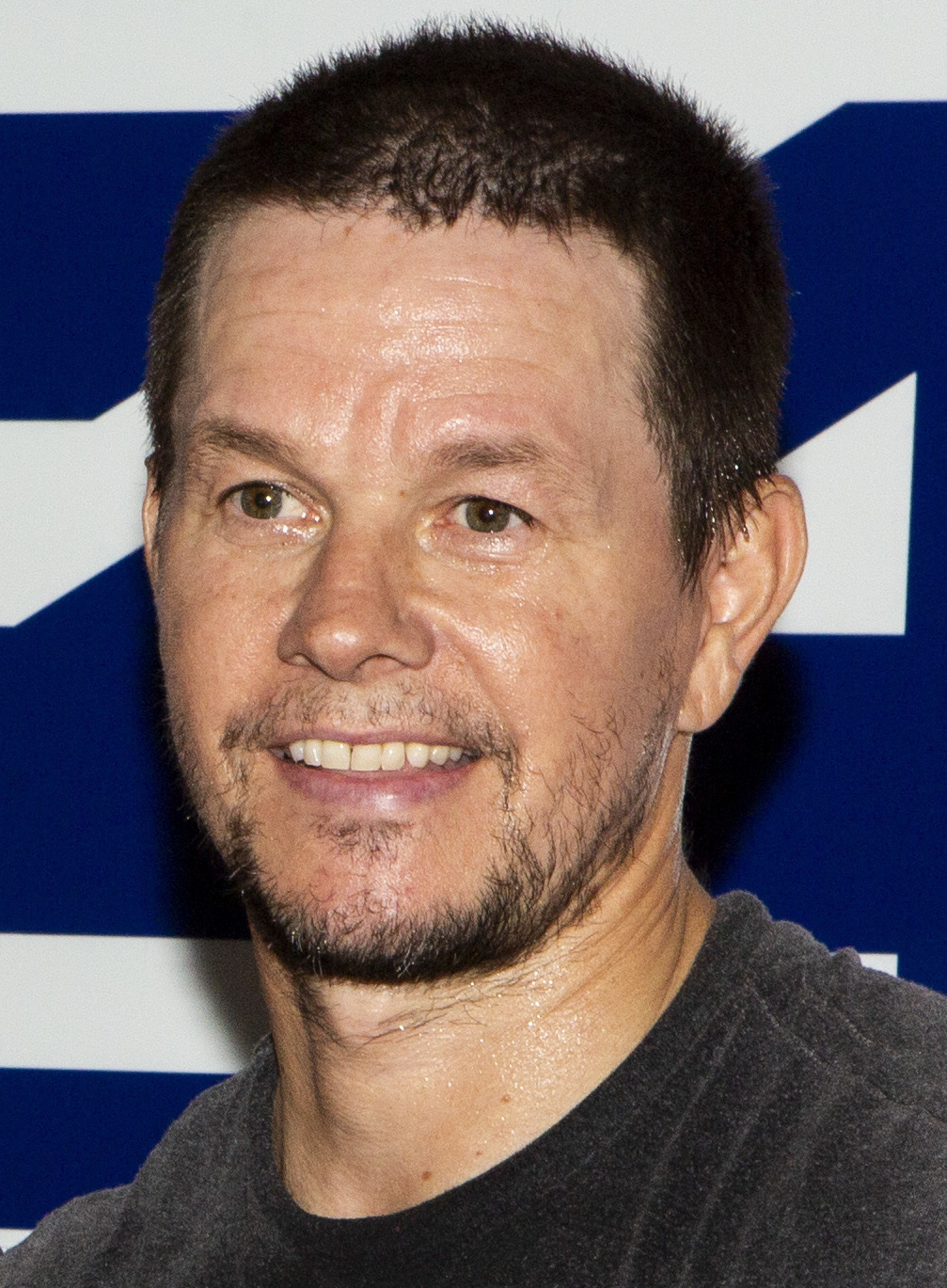
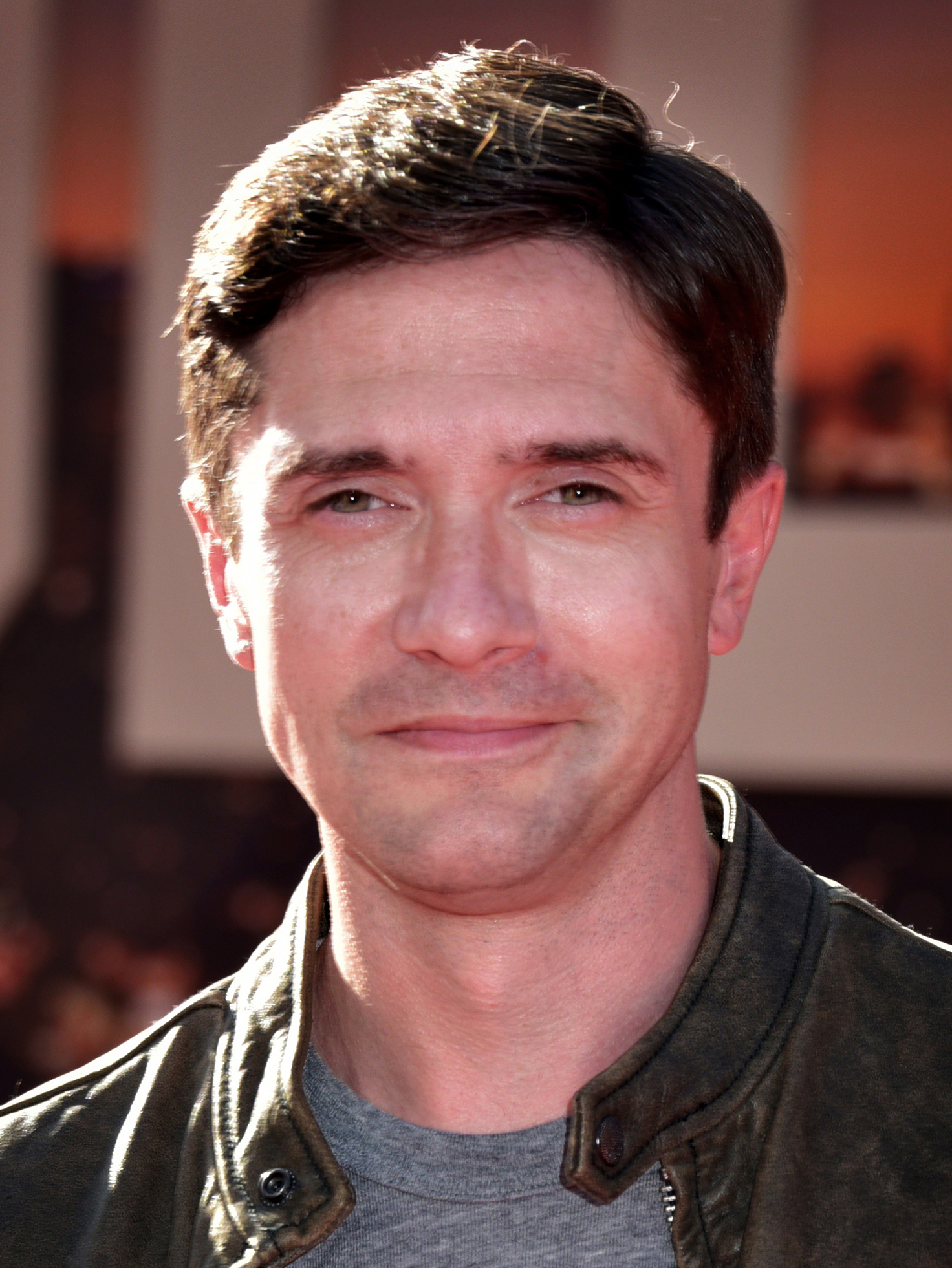
Flight Risk stars (from L to R) Michelle Dockery, Mark Wahlberg and Topher Grace.
- Michelle Dockery as Madolyn Harris, a Deputy U.S. Marshal.
- Mark Wahlberg as the Pilot "Daryl Booth", a hitman disguised as a Texan pilot.
- Topher Grace as Winston, a mob accountant-turned-informant.
- Leah Remini (voice) as Caroline Van Sant, a U.S. Marshal and Madolyn's superior officer.
- Paul Ben-Victor (voice) as Director Coleridge, the agent in charge of the operation.
- Maaz Ali (voice) as Hassan, a pilot who guides the plane from the ground.
  - Monib Abhat appears on-screen as Hassan

== Production ==
In December 2020, Jared Rosenberg's screenplay Flight Risk was voted onto the year's "Black List" of the most-liked unproduced screenplays in Hollywood. In May 2023, it was reported that Mel Gibson would direct and Mark Wahlberg would star. In January 2024, Topher Grace and Michelle Dockery joined the cast.

The film is a co-production between Icon Productions and Davis Entertainment Company. It was produced in association with Media Capital Technologies (a film financing company), Hammerstone Studios and Blue Rider Pictures. Gibson directed and produced the film along with Bruce Davey, John Davis, and John Fox.

Principal photography began in Las Vegas in June 2023. Filming occurred for two days in Mesquite, Nevada in July 2023. Filming also took place in Alaska. SAG-AFTRA granted the filmmakers approval to allow filming during the 2023 SAG-AFTRA strike. Filming concluded in August 2023. Wahlberg partially shaved his head each day while filming for the role of a balding pilot instead of wearing a bald cap.

== Release ==
Flight Risk was released in the United States by Lionsgate on January 24, 2025. It was originally set to be theatrically released on October 18, 2024. Lionsgate spent around $20 million on promoting the film, which did not mention Gibson by name. Social media analytics firm RelishMix reported that online marketing led to 79 million interactions across social media platforms, 40% behind the average for action-thrillers, with online users expressing "negative leaning chatter" given the film's January release. Variety noted that Lionsgate held the film's review embargo until Thursday preview screenings in anticipation of negative critical reviews but that the studio was "likely in an alright enough position" because it "typically covers financial risks by selling off foreign rights to its films before release."

== Reception ==
=== Box office ===
Flight Risk grossed $29.8 million in the United States and Canada, and $18.9 million in other territories, for a worldwide total of $48.7 million.

In the United States and Canada, Flight Risk was released alongside Presence and Brave the Dark and was projected to gross $9–11 million from 3,161 theaters in its opening weekend. It made $4.4 million on its first day, including an estimated $950,000 from Thursday night previews. It debuted to $11.6 million, topping the box office. It was the second number-one opening of 2025 for Lionsgate after Den of Thieves 2: Pantera. Exit polling indicated that 32% of attendees saw the film for Wahlberg and 16% for Gibson. Women accounted for 46% of the audience during its opening, with those over 25 comprising 45% and premium large format screens contributing 27%. In its second weekend, the film made $5.4 million, placing fifth. It dropped out of the box office top ten in its fourth weekend, and ended its theatrical run after 63 days (seven weeks).

=== Critical response ===
On the review aggregator website Rotten Tomatoes, 29% of 129 critics' reviews are positive, with an average rating of 4.7/10. The website's consensus reads: "While there's a place for high-octane dumb fun, Flight Risk dives straight into unpleasant camp without a parachute." Metacritic, which uses a weighted average, assigned the film a score of 38 out of 100, based on 28 critics, indicating "generally unfavorable" reviews. Audiences surveyed by CinemaScore gave the film an average grade of "C" on an A+ to F scale, while those polled by PostTrak gave it a 70% positive score.

Clint Worthington of RogerEbert.com gave the film one and a half out of four stars and wrote, "Flight Risk, with its bonkers casting (Mark Wahlberg as a crazy balding charter pilot assassin) and ridiculous poster tagline ("Y'all need a pilot?"), occasionally teases out the kind of sleazy fun action-movie enthusiasts might reclaim in a few years' time. But as it sits in this passenger's estimation, Flight Risk is a supremely bumpy ride that doesn't quite justify its logline." In a mixed review, Wendy Ide of The Guardian praised Wahlberg's performance, calling it "enormous" and "pulpy fun", though she found the movie "diminished in terms of scope and ambition" compared to Gibson's other directorial efforts. In his review, critic Mark Kermode called it "one of the worst films I've ever seen".
