= The Singing Detective (film) =

2003 American film by Keith Gordon

- Theatrical release poster
- Directed by: Keith Gordon
- Screenplay by: Dennis Potter
- Based on: The Singing Detective by Dennis Potter
- Produced by: Bruce Davey; Steven Haft
- Starring: Robert Downey Jr.; Robin Wright; Jeremy Northam; Katie Holmes; Mel Gibson
- Cinematography: Tom Richmond
- Edited by: Jeff Wishengrad
- Production company: Icon Productions
- Distributed by: Paramount Classics
- Release dates: January 17, 2003 (Sundance); October 24, 2003 (United States)
- Running time: 109 minutes
- Country: United States
- Language: English
- Budget: $8 million
- Box office: $435,625

The Singing Detective is a 2003 American musical crime-comedy film directed by Keith Gordon and loosely based on the BBC serial of the same name, a work by British writer Dennis Potter. It stars Robert Downey Jr. and features a supporting cast that includes Katie Holmes, Adrien Brody, Robin Wright, Mel Gibson, Jeremy Northam and Carla Gugino as well as a number of songs from the 1950s.

== Plot ==
Detective novelist Dan Dark is hospitalized due to the skin disease psoriasis and crippling psoriatic arthritis. Around doctors and nurses, he occasionally hallucinates them in choreographed musical numbers. They attempt to help Dark but are dismissed by Dark's anger and bitterness towards everyone. In an attempt to solve his mental issues, the doctors send him to psychiatrist Dr. Gibbon. The doctor suspects the thoughts behind these problems are in Dark's novel The Secret Detective, which is about a nightclub singer/private eye, hired by Mark Binney, who takes on a strange case involving prostitutes and two mysterious men. He fantasizes about the book during these meetings, with people from the real world acting as the fictional characters.

After reading some pages, Gibbon thinks Dark may have a problem with women. This leads to Dark flashing back to his childhood, when his mother worked as a prostitute and had sex with several men at the home, including his father's business partner. People he encountered in his childhood act as characters in fantasies of his novel; his mother is a prostitute, his father's business partner is a rich guy, and two passengers he only once encountered on a bus are thugs.

Despite his skin condition improving, his attitude worsens after learning a film studio is interested in purchasing the rights for The Singing Detective. He is informed of this by his wife Nicola, who also is a prostitute in the book fantasies. He is paranoid that Nicola is trying to steal the work so she can make money, and that Gibbon was met by a "whore" trying to get into the situation. Additionally, the two thugs from the fantasies have entered the real world, planning to rebel against the author for making them "stand around" constantly instead of playing more important roles, like being officers of the federal government.

Eventually, however, Dark is mentally cured through a civil discussion with Gibbon about his childhood. He states his father didn't care about him due to being a "pain-in-the-ass" to raise, and Dan was often alone in his room to read. His father also constantly beat up his wife and kid. Just as he is about to be released from the hospital, he has another hallucination where reality meets his novel fantasies; the two thugs quickly drag his hospital bed throughout the building and attempt to kill him, while he also imagines himself as the detective alongside other vaudeville women. It ends with the fictional detective shooting the real author. After the hallucination, he leaves the hospital with his wife.

== Cast ==
- Robert Downey Jr. as Dan Dark
  - David Dorfman as Young Dan Dark
- Robin Wright as Nicola / Nina / Blonde
- Jeremy Northam as Mark Binney
- Katie Holmes as Nurse Mills
- Carla Gugino as Betty Dark / Hooker
- Adrien Brody as First Hood
- Mel Gibson as Dr. Gibbon
- Jon Polito as Second Hood
- Saul Rubinek as Skin Specialist
- Alfre Woodard as Chief of Staff
- Amy Aquino as Nurse Nozhki
- Lily Knight as Woman Physiotherapist
- Eddie Jones as Moonglow Bartender
- Clyde Kusatsu as Visiting Japanese Doctor
- Don Fischer as Intern
- Earl C. Poitier as Orderly

== Production ==
Potter's screenplay had been circulating in Hollywood for many years as Potter was enthusiastic about a film version. Robert Altman was at one time attached to direct with Dustin Hoffman in the lead, but financing proved difficult and the production was shelved. It was eventually discovered by an executive at Mel Gibson's production company Icon Productions, who loved it and got Gibson on board to produce.

== Reception ==
The film scored a 40% "Rotten" rating on Rotten Tomatoes, based on reviews from 106 critics, with an average rating of 5.09/10. The website's critical consensus reads: "Delightful performance from Robert Downey Jr. can't save The Singing Detective's transition from TV to the big screen". On Metacritic, the film has a weighted average score of 45 out of 100 based on 33 critics' reviews, indicating "mixed or average reviews."

The New York Times' Caryn James said that "the pared-down screen version sacrifices the sense of discovery that made the mini-series so emotionally powerful". On the other hand, Roger Ebert liked the film and found it to be "a moving experience".

== Soundtrack ==
The soundtrack to The Singing Detective was released on October 14, 2003. It consisted of songs from the 1950s rather than the 1940s as in the original television series.

| No. | Title | Artist | Length |
|---|---|---|---|
| 1. | "In My Dreams" | Gene Vincent | 3:02 |
| 2. | "Just Walking in the Rain" | Johnnie Ray | 2:48 |
| 3. | "Mr. Sandman" | The Chordettes | 2:24 |
| 4. | "It's All in the Game" | Tommy Edwards | 2:37 |
| 5. | "Poison Ivy" | The Coasters | 2:42 |
| 6. | "Important Words" | Gene Vincent | 2:22 |
| 7. | "Harlem Nocturne" | The Viscounts | 2:22 |
| 8. | "At the Hop" | Danny & the Juniors | 2:29 |
| 9. | "Woman Love" | Gene Vincent | 2:33 |
| 10. | "When" | The Kalin Twins | 2:26 |
| 11. | "Flip Flop and Fly" | Big Joe Turner | 2:47 |
| 12. | "Three Steps to Heaven" | Eddie Cochran | 2:22 |
| 13. | "It's Only Make Believe" | Conway Twitty | 2:14 |
| 14. | "In My Dreams" | Robert Downey, Jr. | 4:12 |
| Total length: | | | 37:20 |
