= Carrier (TV series) =

American documentary television series

- Title card
- Genre: Documentary
- Created by: Mitchell Block and Maro Chermayeff
- Developed by: Mitchell Block
- Directed by: Maro Chermayeff
- Theme music composer: Edward Bilous
- Country of origin: United States
- Original language: English
- No. of episodes: 10

Production
- Executive producers: Mel Gibson; Bruce Davey; Nancy Cotton; Mitchell Block; Maro Chermayeff
- Producers: Deborah Dickson; Jeff Dupre
- Cinematography: Axel Baumann, Robert Hanna, Wolfgang Held, Ulli Bonnekamp, Mark Brice
- Editors: Howard Sharp, E. Donna Shepard, Jay Keuper, Maeve O'Boyle, Pam Scott Arnold
- Camera setup: Multi-camera
- Running time: 10 hours, 1 hour each episode

Original release
- Network: PBS
- Release: April 27 – May 1, 2008

Carrier is a PBS documentary television series about the six-month deployment of the United States Navy aircraft carrier USS Nimitz in 2005 from the United States to the Middle East and back. There are ten episodes, and the series is supplemented by a 90-minute companion documentary film called Another Day in Paradise.

== Synopsis ==
Carrier follows the deployment, from May 7, 2005, to November 8, 2005, of the supercarrier USS Nimitz (commanded by then-Captain Ted N. Branch), along with Carrier Air Wing Eleven, from her home port at North Island in Coronado, California to the Persian Gulf during Operation Iraqi Freedom. This character-driven, dramatic non-fiction series includes extensive footage shot aboard as well as interviews with many of the crew about their various experiences, personal concerns and fears. During the deployment, the Nimitz makes stops in Pearl Harbor, Hong Kong, Guam, Kuala Lumpur, Bahrain, and Perth.

== Production ==
The miniseries was produced by Icon Productions and Carrier Project, Inc. It was co-created by Mitchell Block and Maro Chermayeff, and directed by Chermayeff. The executive producers were Block and Chermayeff for Carrier Project, Inc. and Mel Gibson, Bruce Davey and Nancy Cotton, for Icon Productions.

Seventeen filmmakers, including producers Deborah Dickson and Jeff Dupre as well as field producers Matthew Akers, Michelle Smawley and Pamela Yates, shot 1,600 hours of footage to create the series. The series and its companion film were the first documentaries to ever be produced on a US naval warship on active duty over an entire mission. This was accomplished by David Kennedy (Captain, US Navy, Retired) and Block who spent two years obtaining permission to embed on the Nimitz. In 2008, the series was awarded the Emmy for Outstanding Cinematography Reality Programming by the Academy of Television Arts & Sciences in recognition of the work cinematographers Axel Baumann, Ulli Bonnekamp, Mark Brice, Robert Hanna, and Wolfgang Held did on the episode Rights of Passage.

== Events ==
During filming in the Persian Gulf, Seaman Apprentice Robert D. Macrum of the escorting cruiser USS Princeton (CG-59) fell overboard sometime during the night of September 12, 2005, or the early morning of September 13. Despite a five-day search that covered a 360-square-mile (930 km^{2}) area, Macrum, who was 22 and from Sugarland, Texas, was never found.

== Episodes ==
A 26-minute preview of the series was aired by PBS on April 13, 2008. The ten 60-minute episodes began airing on April 27, 2008, with two episodes being shown each night for five straight nights. All episodes were directed by Chermayeff.

No.	Title	Original release date
1	"All Hands"	April 27, 2008
The USS Nimitz leaves California and begins a 6-month deployment that will take this "small town" to Hawaii and beyond. This will be the first extended time away from home for many of the 5,000 men and women on board as well as the first chance many of them will have to interact with people from completely different cultural backgrounds. From the ship's captain on down, each crew member will be expected to perform their assigned duties to the fullest because each task, no matter how trivial it may seem, is important to the safe and successful completion of the mission.
2	"Controlled Chaos"	April 27, 2008
Life at sea can be hard for some, especially when living and working below a major airport and above a nuclear power plant. The constant noise and cramped quarters can take quite some time to get used to. In an environment where even a slight mistake can be deadly, the only protection the crew has against the chaos that surrounds them is the other members of their respective units. These units are essentially surrogate families where members look out for each other, and are refuge where those feeling overwhelmed can go for guidance or just to blow off steam.
3	"Super Secrets"	April 28, 2008
Information related to the ship and her mission is highly classified; secrets, however, are not only mission related. With so many people on board, sex and romance between crew members are inevitable. Officially such relationships are frowned upon, but unofficially a "don't ask don't tell" policy is in effect. This works fairly well, for the most part, until things get out of hand. Before a stop in Hong Kong, a sailor is introduced who is being commended for the example he has set for others and his future seems very bright. As the ship leaves, however, that sailor is accused of misconduct towards a female crew member. Not only has his lack of self control completely ruined his own future, it has also dramatically changed the life of the young female sailor involved.
4	"Squared Away"	April 28, 2008
Life at sea is stressful for all which creates considerable friction among crew members. As with the real world, getting along with the boss is not easy for some in the Navy. Some of this stress can be relieved through port calls, but for many this is still not enough. One sailor is introduced who has decided that joining the navy was a big mistake. He is simply unable or unwilling to put his personal prejudices aside and openly refers to himself a racist. He blames this on the way he was raised, and sees it as his ticket out of the navy. His wish is finally granted after an incident during a stop in Guam. He thinks he has won, but the ship's captain assures viewers that he has not. The ship leaves Guam for the Persian Gulf via the Straits of Malacca.
5	"Show of Force"	April 29, 2008
Under extreme conditions, the Nimitz begins operations within the Persian Gulf, and the frustration of playing only a limited support role begins to show. Some pilots are unhappy that their F-18s have been reduced to being nothing more than very expensive cameras--they have been not allowed to drop even a single bomb and simply want to be allowed to do what they have been trained to do. Some sailors and marines feel that intercepting cargo ships and fishing vessels in search of terrorists is simply not worth the 120 degree temperatures and other dangerous conditions that they have to deal with on a daily basis. Many among the crew are beginning to question the suitability of the carrier for "this type of war".
6	"Groundhog Day"	April 29, 2008
After two months of repetitive daily activity, complacency becomes a major concern. A momentary lapse in concentration can be fatal. Crew members do whatever they can to stay as sharp as possible, but the daily routine is beginning to take its toll. A brief respite comes from a few days of liberty in Bahrain, but the crew is quickly shocked back into the reality when the cruiser Princeton reports a man overboard. An intense search is conducted to find the lost sailor, which ends in vain. The sailor is never found and all speculate on what may have happened.
7	"Rites of Passage"	April 30, 2008
The last day of missions over Iraq mean one last chance for the pilots to get their wish for some real action. As before, however, the pilots return to the Nimitz without dropping a single bomb or firing a single shot. Everyone on board is relieved to be finally heading home, but questions remain regarding why they were sent all this way in the first place. As the carrier crosses the equator, an ancient maritime ritual known as the "Crossing the Line Ceremony" takes place allowing the crew to blow off steam and relax; but everyone is quickly reminded of the dangers that still lie ahead as severe storms in the South Indian Ocean make carrier landing operations much riskier than usual.
8	"True Believers"	April 30, 2008
There are many different expressions of faith on board: from the faith in one's self and one's shipmates, the faith in one's mission and one's country, to the faith in one's god. These many expressions of faith as well as religious life on board the carrier are examined. Most have no problem reconciling their personal beliefs with the fact that they may be asked to kill others on behalf of their country, but for some it causes great inner turmoil. No matter how strong one's beliefs are, however, the temptations of the flesh can be particularly hard to resist when you are young and at sea for months on end. One young sailor learns this the hard way, when the carrier makes a stop in Perth, Australia.
9	"Get Home-itis"	May 1, 2008
The long deployment affects the men and women of the Nimitz in many different ways, including the way it can strain relationships with those back home. In order to make the readjustment to life back on land as smooth as possible, the Navy provides various types of counseling to those on board on what kinds of things to expect when they get back. This episode sees the beginning of the "Tiger Cruise", a ritual which allows sailors to invite family members aboard the ship for the voyage from Hawaii back to the mainland. A father shows his son how to launch planes and a divorced mother, who is in a custody battle with her ex-husband, needs to go to the courts so that her kids can join the cruise.
10	"Full Circle"	May 1, 2008
After six months and more than 57,000 miles of sailing, the men and women on board the Nimitz are ready to return to their homes and families. It is a chance for them to reflect on what they have achieved, whether or not the mission was a success, and what their futures may hold. For some, this marks the end of their time in the navy, and the beginning of their transition back into the "real" world. For others, it is just a chance to recharge their batteries for a few months before going back out and doing it all over again.

== Another Day In Paradise ==
This 90-minute film was created from the same pool of footage used for the series. It covers many of the same themes touched on in the series, but narrows the focus to three men: a pilot, a marine, and a sailor. Not only are all three connected by the fact that they are serving on board the same ship, they are all also struggling with various family issues and the different phases of fatherhood. The film was released in the U.S. on June 16, 2008, and was directed by Deborah Dickson.

== Disc releases ==
Series

A 3-disc, 600-minute region 1 DVD version of the documentary was released by PBS on May 6, 2008. Special features include scene selection, the preview episode, deleted and extended scenes, closed captioning and 16:9 anamorphic widescreen.

Film

A 90-minute region A1 Blu-ray Disc version of Another Day In Paradise was released by PBS on March 10, 2009.

== See also ==
- Sailor, a similar documentary about the life on board HMS Ark Royal in the 1970s.
