= Randall Wallace =

American screenwriter, director and producer

- Born: July 28, 1949 (age 77); Jackson, Tennessee, U.S.
- Education: Duke University
- Occupations: Screenwriter, film director, film producer
- Website: wallaceentertainment.com

Randall Wallace (born July 28, 1949) is an American screenwriter, film director and producer who came to prominence by writing the screenplay for the historical drama film Braveheart (1995). His work on the film earned him a nomination for the Academy Award for Best Original Screenplay and a Writers Guild of America Award in the same category. He has since directed films such as The Man in the Iron Mask (1998), We Were Soldiers (2002), Secretariat (2010) and Heaven Is for Real (2014).

== Early life and education ==
Born in Jackson, Tennessee, he lived in Memphis and Henderson County, Tennessee before moving to Virginia. Wallace began writing stories at the age of seven. He graduated from E.C. Glass High School in Lynchburg, Virginia and attended Duke University, where he studied Russian, religion, and literature and was a member of Lambda Chi Alpha fraternity. He put himself through a graduate year of seminary by teaching martial arts. Wallace holds a black belt in karate.

== Career ==
After managing an animal show at Nashville's Opryland, Wallace moved to Hollywood to pursue a career in singing and songwriting. He began writing short stories, novels and scripts for movies. Wallace was taken under the wing of leading television producer Stephen J. Cannell and spent several years writing for television in the late 1980s and early 1990s.

He gained recognition and commercial success by penning the screenplay for Braveheart (1995), which was inspired by a trip to Scotland to learn more about his Scottish roots. While there, he discovered the legend of the medieval Scottish patriot William Wallace. His shared ancestry with William Wallace, other than a surname, is only a report from a cousin in the army, who was stationed in Europe, that a "Wallace had come from Scotland." Braveheart became Wallace's first screenplay to be produced, after drawing the interest of Mel Gibson, who went on to produce, direct and star in the film. It ended up as one of the most successful films of 1995, earning over $200 million. It was nominated for ten Academy Awards, including a Best Original Screenplay nomination for Wallace, and won five, including the Academy Awards for Best Picture and Best Director. Braveheart also won one Golden Globe Award and four BAFTA Awards.

Wallace made his directorial debut with his own screenplay in The Man in the Iron Mask (1998), starring Leonardo DiCaprio, John Malkovich, Gabriel Byrne, Jeremy Irons and Gérard Depardieu. Shortly after, he wrote the screenplay for Pearl Harbor (2001), directed by Michael Bay and starring Ben Affleck, Josh Hartnett and Kate Beckinsale.

This was followed by Wallace's second film as director We Were Soldiers (2002), on which Wallace re-teamed with Mel Gibson. It was about the Battle of Ia Drang (1965) during the Vietnam War, based on the memoir by Lieutenant General Hal Moore.

Wallace directed Disney's Secretariat (2010), the true story of the racehorse that won the Triple Crown in 1973. The film chronicled the struggles and courage of owner Penny Chenery-Tweedy, portrayed by Academy Award-nominated actress Diane Lane. Wallace also wrote the end title song, It's Who You Are, which was released with the Secretariat soundtrack.

Wallace's next directorial project was the religious drama Heaven Is for Real (2014), based on the story of the same name. In June 2016, Wallace stated that he and Gibson had begun work on a sequel to The Passion of the Christ (2004), which will focus on the resurrection of Jesus, and the events surrounding the resurrection.

== Other work ==
Wallace is the New York Times bestselling author of seven novels and the lyricist of the hymn "Mansions of the Lord", originally written for We Were Soldiers and performed as the recessional for President Ronald Reagan's national funeral.

In 2008, Wallace wrote several songs with singer/songwriter Richard Marx. One of those songs, "Flame In Your Fire", appears on Marx's album Emotional Remains.

In interviews he has acknowledged a deep commitment to Christianity, which he credits as an influence on his approach to filmmaking.

He appeared in 3 episodes of HBO's comedy series Entourage as himself, starting with the seventh season episode 3 "Dramedy".

In addition to his work as a filmmaker, Wallace is the founder of Hollywood for Habitat for Humanity and the father of three sons. In 1999, he formed his own company, Wheelhouse Entertainment, which is focused on creating entertainment for worldwide audiences based on the values of love, courage and honor.

Wallace was the speaker at the Fellowship Foundation National Prayer Breakfast on February 3, 2011.

Wallace served as the commencement speaker at the Liberty University graduation ceremony on May 14, 2011.

== Bibliography ==
- 1973 – Tran Chau Cang
- 1980 – The Russian Rose
- 1983 – So Late into the Night
- 1990 – Blood of the Lamb
- 1992 – Where Angels Watch
- 1995 – Braveheart (novelization)
- 1999 – The Man in the Iron Mask (novelization)
- 2001 – Pearl Harbor (novelization)
- 2002 – We Were Soldiers (novelization)
- 2004 – Love and Honor
- 2011 – The Touch
- 2015 – Living the Braveheart Life: Finding the Courage to Follow Your Heart (non-fiction)

== Filmography ==
Year	Title	Role			Notes
Year	Title	Director	Writer	Producer	Notes
1995	Braveheart	No	Yes	No	Writers Guild of America Award for Best Original Screenplay; Nominated – Academy Award for Best Original Screenplay; Nominated – Golden Globe Award for Best Screenplay
1998	The Man in the Iron Mask	Yes	Yes	Yes	
2001	Pearl Harbor	No	Yes	Executive	Stinkers Bad Movie Award for Worst Screenplay for a Film Grossing More than $100 Million; Nominated – Golden Raspberry Award for Worst Screenplay
2002	We Were Soldiers	Yes	Yes	Yes	
2010	Secretariat	Yes	No	No	Christopher Award for Best Feature Film; Movieguide Award for Best Film for Mature Audiences
2014	Heaven Is for Real	Yes	Yes	No	Nominated – Real to Reel Grand Jury Prize for Best Independent Feature
2016	Hacksaw Ridge	No	Uncredited	No	
2027	The Resurrection of the Christ: Part One	No	Yes	No	Post-production
2028	The Resurrection of the Christ: Part Two	No	Yes	No	Post-production

=== Television ===
Year	Title	Role			Notes
Year	Title	Director	Writer	Producer	Notes
1986	Hunter	No	Yes	No	Episode: "Fagin 1986"
1986	Starman	No	Yes	No	Episode: "Secrets"
1987	Stingray	No	Yes	No	Episode: "Anywhere, Anytime"
1987–88	J.J. Starbuck	No	Yes	Yes	3 episodes
1988	Sonny Spoon	No	Yes	Executive	Creator
1989	Unsub	No	Yes	No	2 episodes
1990–91	Broken Badges	No	Yes	Executive	Creator
1996	Dark Angel	No	Story	No	Television film
2015	Point of Honor	Yes	Yes	Executive	Television film
