= Jaakko Ohtonen =

Finnish actor (born 1989)

- Ohtonen in 2026.
- Born: 25 August 1989 (age 37); Oulu, Finland
- Occupation: Actor
- Years active: 2015–present
- Notable work: All the Sins, The Last Kingdom, To Cook a Bear, Vikings: Valhalla

Jaakko Ohtonen (Finnish pronunciation: [ˈjɑːkːo ˈohtonen], born 25 August 1989) is a Finnish actor and voiceover artist. He has been cast in the role of Jesus Christ (replacing Jim Caviezel) in Mel Gibson's The Resurrection of the Christ: Part One (2027) and Part Two (2028).

== Career ==
Ohtonen studied film acting at Voionmaa College in Tampere during years 2008–2009. After that, he studied at the Department of Acting at the University of Tampere and graduated with a master's degree in Theatre Arts in 2015. After graduating, he has worked as a freelance actor. Ohtonen started working at the group theatre Meriteatteri in 2015. Ohtonen has also acted at the Tampere Theatre and the group theatre Siperia.

Ohtonen's acting television roles include Sunnuntailounas in 2018. The following year, he appeared in first season of the Finnish crime drama series All the Sins and provided the voice of the Finnish version of Big Brother reality television show. In 2020 he portrayed Jere in the Finnish television series Hotel Swan Helsinki. He also appeared in the medical series Syke.

In 2022, Ohtonen appeared again in the third season of Finnish crime drama series All the Sins. Ohtonen portrayed Wolland in the final series of the historical television drama The Last Kingdom for Netflix. He also appeared in the historical epic series Vikings: Valhalla.

In 2025 he could be seen in the Swedish Disney+ original historical drama series To Cook a Bear. That year, he was cast as Jesus Christ (replacing Jim Caviezel) in the Mel Gibson films The Resurrection of the Christ: Part One and Part Two, the sequels to the 2004 film The Passion of the Christ, and commenced filming in the role in October 2025 in Italy.

== Personal life ==
Ohtonen married the Finnish television presenter Alma Hätönen in July 2024. He had proposed to her in Lapland whilst on holiday, eight years into their relationship.

== See also ==
- List of Finnish actors
- List of actors who have played Jesus
