= Forry Smith =

American actor (born 1952)

- Born: Forrest Smith; December 1, 1952 (age 73); Waterloo, Iowa, U.S.
- Occupations: actor, football player
- Years active: 1987-present
- Spouse: Cheryl Richardson (1994-present) 2 children
- Children: Tanner and Olivia

Forry Smith (born December 1, 1952) is an American actor. He played Reese Walker on NBC's soap opera Santa Barbara. He portrayed the role from 1992 to 1993.

Smith was an 11th round selection (309th overall pick) in the 1976 NFL draft by the Buffalo Bills out of Iowa State University as a wide receiver.
