= Hamlet (1990 film) =

1990 film by Franco Zeffirelli

- Theatrical release poster
- Directed by: Franco Zeffirelli
- Screenplay by: Christopher De Vore; Franco Zeffirelli
- Based on: Hamlet by William Shakespeare
- Produced by: Bruce Davey; Dyson Lovell
- Starring: Mel Gibson; Glenn Close; Alan Bates; Paul Scofield; Ian Holm; Helena Bonham Carter
- Cinematography: David Watkin
- Edited by: Richard Marden
- Music by: Ennio Morricone
- Production companies: Carolco Pictures; Nelson Entertainment; Icon Productions; Sovereign Pictures; Canal+
- Distributed by: Warner Bros. (North America); Guild Film Distribution (United Kingdom); Carolco International (United Kingdom, France and Italy); Sovereign Pictures (International)
- Release dates: 19 December 1990 (limited); 18 January 1991 (wide)
- Running time: 134 minutes
- Countries: United Kingdom; United States; Italy; France
- Language: English
- Budget: £12.6 million
- Box office: $22.3 million (US/UK)

Hamlet is a 1990 drama film based on the Shakespearean tragedy of the same name, directed by Franco Zeffirelli and starring Mel Gibson as the eponymous character. The film also features Glenn Close, Alan Bates, Paul Scofield, Ian Holm, Helena Bonham Carter, Stephen Dillane, and Nathaniel Parker. An international co-production between the United States, the United Kingdom, Italy and France, the film was the first produced by Icon Productions, a company co-founded by Gibson.

== Plot ==
The film largely follows the plot of the original play, albeit omitting certain dialogue and minor characters to fit the average length of a feature film. This version also makes no modern adaptations.

== Cast ==
- Mel Gibson as Prince Hamlet
- Glenn Close as Queen Gertrude
- Alan Bates as King Claudius
- Paul Scofield as the ghost of King Hamlet
- Ian Holm as Polonius
- Helena Bonham Carter as Ophelia
- Stephen Dillane as Horatio
- Nathaniel Parker as Laertes
- Michael Maloney and Sean Murray as Rosencrantz and Guildenstern
- Trevor Peacock as the Gravedigger
- Pete Postlethwaite as the Player King
- Christopher Fairbank as the Player Queen
- John McEnery as Osric
- Richard Warwick as Bernardo
- Christien Anholt as Marcellus

== Production ==
Zeffirelli announced production of the film in April 1989 at a press conference in Los Angeles. Mel Gibson was at that same press conference, where it was announced that he would play Hamlet. Zeffirelli had set out to make a Shakespearian adaptation that would be accessible and appealing to younger viewers, and casting Gibson was considered an intent to lure said audience into seeing it. Glenn Close was another obvious choice, having had recent box-office success with such Hollywood thrillers as Jagged Edge and Fatal Attraction.

Financing was provided on loan from a Dutch bank by Carolco Pictures, Barry Spikings' Nelson Entertainment, and Sovereign Pictures for approximately $16 million. Filming was set to begin on 23 April 1990, with an 11-week shooting schedule.

Gibson, who had grown up idolizing one of his costars, legendary Shakespearean actor Paul Scofield, compared the experience of performing Shakespeare alongside him to being, "thrown into the ring with Mike Tyson".

Dunnottar Castle, Stonehaven and Blackness Castle were used as locations in the film. Dover Castle provided the main location for Elsinore Castle, the home of Hamlet and his family. Interiors were filmed at Shepperton Studios in London.

Norma Moriceau was the project's initial costume designer, but quit for unknown reasons, to be replaced by Maurizio Millenotti. Tailors from Shepperton assembled the costumes.

The film attracted little attention from major Hollywood studios, until post-production, when companies such as Warner Bros., Paramount, and Orion expressed interest in purchasing the film. Nelson Entertainment, which held the North American distribution rights, licensed theatrical exhibition to Warner Bros. as part of an incentive to lure Gibson into making Lethal Weapon 3. Despite Nelson owning a home video arm, they sold the video rights to Warner Bros. as well. Warner Bros. attempted to attract high schools with study guides and vouchers for students. An hour-long educational video titled Mel Gibson Goes Back to School was released in conjunction with the film, showing the actor lecturing on Hamlet to a group of high-school students in Los Angeles.

== Adaptation and interpretation ==
Film scholar Deborah Cartmell has suggested that Zeffirelli's Shakespeare films are appealing because they are "sensual rather than cerebral", an approach by which he aims to make Shakespeare "even more popular". To this end, he cast Gibson – then famous for the Mad Max and Lethal Weapon films – in the title role. Cartmell also notes that the text is drastically cut, but with the effect of enhancing the roles of the women.

J. Lawrence Guntner has suggested that Zeffirelli's cinematography borrows heavily from the action film genre that made Gibson famous, noting that its average shot length is less than six seconds. In casting Gibson, the director has been said to have made the star's reputation part of the performance, encouraging the audience "to see the Gibson that they have come to expect from his other films". Indeed, Zeffirelli cast Gibson after watching the scene in Lethal Weapon in which Gibson's character, Martin Riggs, contemplates suicide. The fight between Hamlet and Laertes is an example of using Gibson's experience in action movies; Gibson depicts Hamlet as an experienced swordsman.

== Reception ==
=== Critical response ===
Initial reviews for Zeffirelli's Hamlet were mixed. Roger Ebert of the Chicago Sun-Times gave the film three-and-a-half out of four stars, calling Mel Gibson's portrayal of the Danish Prince "a strong, intelligent performance." Caryn James of The New York Times praised Zeffirelli's "naturalistic, emotionally-charged" direction and also commended Gibson's "visceral" performance, describing it as "strong, intelligent and safely beyond ridicule." Peter Travers of Rolling Stone gave the film a negative review, calling Gibson's performance "an earnest but pedestrian reading." Michael Wilmington of the Los Angeles Times called Gibson's Hamlet an "Oedipal wreck" and stated that either Kenneth Branagh or Daniel Day-Lewis would have been preferable to play Hamlet than Gibson. A later editorial in the same paper would refer to Gibson's performance as "the most unaffected and lucid Hamlet in memory."

On Rotten Tomatoes, the film has an approval rating of 76% based on reviews from 37 critics. The site's consensus was, "It may lack some of the depth and complexity of the play, but Mel Gibson and Franco Zeffirelli make a surprisingly successful team." On Metacritic, the film has a score of 53% based on reviews from 18 critics, indicating "mixed or average" reviews. Audiences surveyed by CinemaScore gave the film a grade A on scale of A to F.

=== Box office ===
The film grossed $20.7 million in the United States and Canada and $1.6 million in the United Kingdom.

=== Accolades ===
The film was nominated for two Academy Awards, for Best Art Direction (Dante Ferretti, Francesca Lo Schiavo) and Best Costume Design (Maurizio Millenotti). Sir Alan Bates received a BAFTA nomination as Best Supporting Actor for playing Claudius.
