= One Eight Seven =

1997 crime drama film directed by Kevin Reynolds

187
- Theatrical release poster
- Directed by: Kevin Reynolds
- Written by: Scott Yagemann
- Produced by: Bruce Davey; Stephen McEveety
- Starring: Samuel L. Jackson; John Heard; Kelly Rowan; Clifton Gonzalez Gonzalez
- Cinematography: Ericson Core
- Edited by: Stephen Semel
- Music by: David Darling; Michael Stearns
- Production company: Icon Productions
- Distributed by: Warner Bros.
- Release date: July 30, 1997
- Running time: 119 minutes
- Country: United States
- Language: English
- Budget: $20 million
- Box office: $5.7 million

One Eight Seven (also known as 187) is a 1997 American crime drama thriller film directed by Kevin Reynolds. It was the first top-billed starring role for Samuel L. Jackson, who plays a Los Angeles teacher caught with gang trouble in an urban high school. It also has John Heard, Kelly Rowan, and Clifton Collins Jr. in supporting roles. The film's name comes from the California Penal Code Section 187, which defines murder.

The original screenplay was written in 1995 by Scott Yagemann, a Los Angeles area high school substitute teacher for seven years. He wrote the screenplay after an incident when a violent transfer student had threatened to kill him and his family. Yagemann reported the threat to the authorities and the student was arrested. About a week later, he was called by the district attorney to testify against the student in a court of law, where the student was being prosecuted for stabbing a teacher's aide a year before. This annoyed Yagemann, who had not been told about it beforehand, and led to him writing the screenplay. He claimed that 90% of the film's material is based on incidents that had happened to him and other teachers in real life. One Eight Seven was produced by Icon Productions and released by Warner Bros. on July 30, 1997. The film received mixed to negative reviews from critics and was a box office bomb, grossing $5.7 million against a $20 million budget.

== Plot ==
Trevor Garfield is a high school science teacher in Brooklyn. Dennis Broadway, a gangster student to whom he had given a failing grade, threatens to murder him, writing the number 187 (the police code for homicide) on every page in a textbook. Trevor reports his concerns to the administration, who ignores his warning. Soon afterwards, Dennis ambushes Trevor in the school hallway, stabbing him in the back and side multiple times with a shiv.

Trevor survives and resumes his teaching career fifteen months later. He relocates to the San Fernando Valley area of Los Angeles and works as a substitute teacher, but is assigned to another class of unruly students, including a Chicano tag crew by the name of "Kappin' Off Suckers" (K.O.S.). Their leader, Benny Chacón, a felon attending high school as a condition of probation, makes it clear to Trevor that there will be no mutual respect.

Tension mounts when another teacher, Ellen Henry, confides that Benny has threatened her life, an action against which the school administration refuses to take action out of fear of legal action. After Benny murders a rival tagger and disappears, his tag partner, César Sanchez, takes over as leader of the gang. César defies Trevor's attempts to establish order, stealing his watch. Trevor reports this to the principal, who declines to act. Trevor learns the combination to César's locker and retrieves his watch. He confronts César and suggests that they start over, but César refuses.

César escalates the conflict with Trevor by killing Ellen's dog. After spraying graffiti depicting the dead dog, César is shot with a syringe filled with morphine attached to the end of an arrow. He wakes up to find his right trigger finger removed. The hospital receives a letter with the finger, which has "R U DUN" ("are you done?") tattooed upon it. Later, Rita Martínez, a student Trevor is tutoring, drops out of school to escape her abuse by the K.O.S. Trevor himself is fired after administrators find out he had invited Rita to his house for a tutoring session, citing the unsavory implications.

When Benny's body is discovered in the Los Angeles River, César and the K.O.S. suspect Trevor in the killing. The gang corner Trevor at his home and make him confess to killing Benny and cutting off César's finger. Taking their cue from the film The Deer Hunter, they force Trevor into a contest of Russian roulette with César. After each round, Trevor talks about the lost-cause lifestyle César has led. On the penultimate round, Trevor takes his turn and survives. Instead of handing the weapon to César, Trevor takes the next turn and kills himself. Driven by his sense of honor and enraged over his failed revenge, César insists on taking his rightful turn against the protests of his horrified friends, killing himself also with the remaining bullet.

On graduation day, Rita is shown to have completed her studies along with the now former K.O.S. member Stevie, who is filled with remorse over his prior involvement in gang life. Rita offers a tribute to Trevor by reading an essay about him. The essay incorporates the theme of the pyrrhic victory. Paco, the only other surviving member of the K.O.S, drops out of school yet stays behind long enough to watch the graduation before disappearing into the city. A heartbroken Ellen resigns.

The closing narration cites a 1994 MetLife-Louis Harris Survey stating one in nine teachers has been attacked in school and 95 percent of those attacks were committed by students, as well as the movie being written by a teacher.

== Cast ==
- Samuel L. Jackson as Trevor Garfield
- John Heard as Dave Childress
- Kelly Rowan as Ellen Henry
- Clifton Collins Jr. as César "Kartoon" Sánchez
- Tony Plana as Principal García
- Karina Arroyave as Rita Martínez
- Lobo Sebastian as Benito "Benny" Chacón
- Jack Kehler as Larry Hyland
- Demetrius Navarro as Paco
- Jonah Rooney as Stevie Littleton
- Method Man as Dennis Broadway
- Dominic Hoffman as Victor
- Kathryn Leigh Scott as Anglo Woman

== Reception ==
On Rotten Tomatoes, One Eight Seven has an approval rating of 30% based on reviews from 27 critics. Metacritic, which uses a weighted average, assigned the film a score of 41 out of 100, based on 15 critics, indicating "mixed or average" reviews.

Roger Ebert rated the film 2 out of 4 stars, complimenting the "strong and sympathetic performance" by Samuel L. Jackson and saying that the movie "has elements that are thoughtful and tough about inner-city schools" but it also contains "elements that belong in a crime thriller or a war movie". He also felt that the movie's "destination doesn't have much to do with how it got there".

The film grossed $5.7 million domestically in its theatrical release.

Director Kevin Reynolds said the movie was a "great experience" and blamed the grim ending for its lukewarm reception.

In an interview with Vulture, Jackson called One Eight Seven his most underrated film:

"One Eight Seven was a serious subject that got kicked to the curb for some reason. I remember they were trying to get us on Oprah to talk about the plight of teachers in schools. And she was busy promoting Beloved, so she wouldn’t. 'I don’t do violence on my shows.' I said, 'Bitch, you just killed your goddamn daughter in your own room. The fuck you talking about? Give me a break.' And now prophetically teachers are getting jacked in schools every day. This movie spoke directly to that."

== Soundtrack ==
Music from the Motion Picture 187

Soundtrack album by Various artists
- Released: July 29, 1997
- Recorded: 1997
- Genres: Hip hop, electronica, trip hop
- Label: Atlantic

Professional ratings
Review scores
| Source | Rating |
|---|---|
| AllMusic | 4/5 stars |

The film's soundtrack was released under the title Music from the Motion Picture 187 on July 29, 1997, through Atlantic Records. Unlike films like Dangerous Minds and The Substitute that dealt with similar subject matter, this soundtrack did not receive an urban music soundtrack. Instead, the soundtrack was made up of trip hop, a combination of hip hop and electronica. The Miles Davis song Blue in Green plays in the background of the scene in which Samuel L. Jackson's character Trevor Garfield invites fellow teacher Ellen Henry (played by Kelly Rowan) over to his house, but the song is not included on the soundtrack.

Track listing

| No. | Title | Performing artist | Length |
|---|---|---|---|
| 1. | "Slack Hands" | Galliano | 4:46 |
| 2. | "Spying Glass" | Massive Attack | 5:20 |
| 3. | "Release Yo' Delf (Prodigy Remix)" | Method Man | 4:54 |
| 4. | "Stem" | DJ Shadow | 3:25 |
| 5. | "Flipside" | Everything But the Girl | 4:30 |
| 6. | "Karmacoma" | Massive Attack | 5:21 |
| 7. | "In November" | Dave Darling | 4:28 |
| 8. | "Neither Sing Sing nor Baden Baden" | Bang Bang | 5:57 |
| 9. | "Raincry" | God Within | 5:40 |
| 10. | "Pregao" | Madredeus | 4:03 |
| 11. | "The Wilderness" | V Love | 5:16 |
| 12. | "Mankind, Pt. 2" | Jalal Mansur Nuriddin | 5:02 |

== See also ==
- List of hood films
