= Bruce Davey =

Australian film producer

- Born: Sydney, New South Wales, Australia
- Occupation: Film producer

Bruce Davey is an Australian film producer. A partner in Icon Productions alongside Mel Gibson, he was born in Sydney and has produced many films including Apocalypto, The Passion of the Christ, Push, and Braveheart, for which he won an Academy Award for Best Picture. Davey began as Gibson's CPA after being recommended by Gibson's running coach from Gallipoli. After becoming Gibson's business manager, the two founded Icon Productions in 1989.

== Filmography ==
Davey was a producer with all films unless otherwise noted.

=== Film ===
Year	Film	Credit	Ref
1990	Hamlet	Executive producer	
1992	Forever Young		
1993	The Man Without a Face		
1993	Airborne		
1994	Maverick		
1994	Immortal Beloved		
1995	Braveheart		
1995	Dad and Dave: On Our Selection		
1997	Anna Karenina		
1997	One Eight Seven		
1997	FairyTale: A True Story		
1999	Payback		
1999	An Ideal Husband		
1999	Felicia's Journey		
2000	The Million Dollar Hotel		
2000	Kevin & Perry Go Large	Executive producer	
2000	When the Sky Falls	Co-executive producer	
2000	Bless the Child	Executive producer	
2000	What Women Want		
2000	The Magic Pudding	Executive producer	
2001	The Martins		
2002	We Were Soldiers		
2003	The Singing Detective		
2003	Blackball	Executive producer	
2004	The Passion of the Christ		
2004	Gladiatress		
2004	Paparazzi		
2006	Seraphim Falls		
2006	Apocalypto		
2007	Butterfly on a Wheel	Executive producer	
2009	Push		
2009	Infestation		
2012	Get the Gringo		
2014	Stonehearst Asylum		
2016	Hacksaw Ridge		
2017	2:22		
2025	Flight Risk		
2027	The Resurrection of the Christ: Part One		
2028	The Resurrection of the Christ: Part Two		
TBA	The Wild Bunch		

As an actor

Year	Film	Role	Ref
1994	Immortal Beloved	Artillery Captain	

Music department

Year	Film	Role	Ref
TBA	The Passion of the Christ: Resurrection	Producer	

=== Television ===
Year	Title	Credit	Notes	Ref
1991	Mel Gibson Goes Back to School	Executive producer	Documentary	
2000	The Three Stooges	Executive producer	Television film	
2001	Invincible	Executive producer	Television film	
2003	Family Curse		Television film	
2004	Evel Knievel	Executive producer	Television film	
2004	Kevin Hill	Executive producer		
2004–05	Complete Savages	Executive producer		
2004–05	Clubhouse	Executive producer		
2005	The Dive from Clausen's Pier	Executive producer	Television film	
2008	Carrier	Executive producer	Documentary	
2008	Another Day in Paradise		Documentary	
