= Icon Productions =

Australian independent film and distribution company

- Logo used since 1994
- Type: Pty Ltd
- Industry: Film
- Founded: August 1989; 37 years ago
- Headquarters: Sydney, Australia; Santa Monica, California, U.S.
- Key people: Mel Gibson; Bruce Davey
- Products: Motion pictures
- Website: iconfilm.com.au

Icon Productions, also formerly referred to as Icon Entertainment International (stylized as ICON), is an Australian-American independent film production and distribution company founded in August 1989 by actor/director Mel Gibson and Australian producing partner Bruce Davey. Icon Productions LLC's headquarters were established in Santa Monica, California, before opening branches in Sydney, Australia, and in the UK, and expanding into the business of film distribution.

Between 2008 and 2009, the company's UK operations were sold to Access Industries, and in March 2018, Icon Film Distribution UK was sold to Kaleidoscope Film Distribution UK. As of 2025, the parent company Dendy Icon Group in Australia, still held by Gibson and Davey, owns Icon Productions, Icon Film Distribution, Dendy Cinemas, and Icon Film Finance. There is also an Icon Productions office in Santa Monica, run by Vicki Christianson.

== History ==
=== 1990s–early 2000s: Foundation and first projects ===
Icon started when Gibson was having trouble in financing his film Hamlet. Gibson and Davey co-founded Icon Productions in August 1989 in order to fund the film.

Gibson has explained that the company's name was chosen because icon means "image" in Greek, and that the inspiration came from a book on Russian icons in his den. The logo's artwork originally features a sketch of Michael the Archangel in 1993, but now features a small crop of the mother's left eye from the Theotokos of Vladimir icon, an Eastern Orthodox icon of Mary, mother of God.

Crop of Theotokos of Vladimir icon as an Icon Productions logo

Unlike most other independents, Icon financed most of its development and packaging costs internally, mainly by Gibson, allowing it to retain creative control of projects through production.

In late 1996, New Zealand producer Timothy White became founding head of a co-production venture between Fox and Gibson, called Fox-Icon, based at Fox Studios Australia in Sydney. The company failed to produce a single film, shutting down in December 1999.

The company was initially based at Warner Bros. Pictures where it had a deal in place for 10 years. In 1999, the company signed an exclusive production deal with Paramount Pictures where Paramount handled North American rights to its titles from Icon Productions. In 2002, the company moved its North American first-look deal to 20th Century Fox.

In August 1999, the UK division signed a home video deal with Warner Home Video.

In 2000, Icon established a film distribution company for in Sydney, Australia, headed by Mark Gooder. A UK subsidiary for distribution was also established. Gooder moved to Los Angeles (Santa Monica) in 2006 to manage production, acquisition, and distribution operations there. After the financial success of The Passion of the Christ (2004), there was frequent mention of the ability of Icon to function as a mini-studio. However, Davey downplayed those expectations, saying, "The last thing we want is to become a studio. We don't want to become that top-heavy. We want to be independent and passionate. We don't want to lose the magic".

Icon Productions owned a library of over 250 film titles.

=== 2008–2009: Financing deals, further projects, and legal troubles ===
At the beginning of 2008, Icon was co-financing and co-selling the thriller Push, with Summit Entertainment. It also had stakes in The Black Balloon, an Australian drama starring Toni Collette, and the horror comedy Infestation.

In January 2008, Mark Gooder, then president of acquisitions and development, overseeing Icon Productions, Icon Entertainment International as well as the distribution companies in Australia and the UK, was appointed CEO in place of Davey. Gooder also became board member, along with COO and CFO Vicki Christianson. Davey's role as CEO of Icon Productions ended on 1 January 2008, but he continued as chairman of the board. Gooder managed Icon Productions' international sales and the UK distribution company from Los Angeles, at the same time running Icon in Australia.

In February 2008, it was reported that screenwriter Benedict Fitzgerald was suing Mel Gibson, along with Vicki Christianson, Icon Productions, Icon Distribution, Marquis Films, and Airborne Productions, for defrauding him of millions of dollars, as well as incorrectly taking co-writing credit for the screenplay of Passion of the Christ. In May 2009, Gibson agreed to an undisclosed settlement with Fitzgerald. Details of the settlement, agreed at Los Angeles County Superior Court, were not released.

In February 2008, Icon entered the exhibition business for the first time by purchasing Dendy Cinemas, Australia's largest independent film distributor and art house cinema chain.

In September 2008, Davey and Gibson started negotiations for the sale of the Icon international sales and film distribution arms along with the Majestic library. UK operations were sold to US-based industrial group Access Industries (founded by Leonard Blavatnik), with former UK Film Council chairman Stewart Till as new CEO and equity holder in the business. The new company would continue to use the Icon name and would have a three-year first-look deal with Icon Productions to handle the international rights to its productions. The sale was completed in November 2009. The deal included Icon's international sales company, the distribution operation based in the UK, and the Majestic Films & Television library, but not the Los Angeles operation Icon Productions LLC, which Gibson still owned outright with Davey, who relocated to Australia, the distribution operation based in Australia and the Dendy Cinemas operation were also not part of the acquisition deal.

=== 2010–present: UK branch closure and most recent projects ===
In November 2011, Icon announced it was closing its UK distribution wing to focus on financing and producing films, with Lionsgate UK taking over distribution and was said to be in talks to buy its back catalogue. In late 2012, Icon Entertainment International re-acquired a majority of the Producers Sales Organization library from Lionsgate. In 2013, it was announced that Icon UK could get backing from film fund Prescience. Earlier, the unit hired Exclusive Media (later AMBI Group) to represent its library. In September 2013, Icon Film Distribution UK was purchased by investment company New Sparta.

In August 2012 Mark Gooder left Icon, after being appointed president of acquisitions and Australian operations for The Weinstein Company.

Icon Film Distribution UK was put up for sale by New Sparta in September 2017; the following March, New Sparta sold Icon Film Distribution UK to Kaleidoscope Film Distribution.

In 2017, Icon Productions LLC in the US sued the producer of their film The Professor and the Madman for breach of contract, but on 19 June 2018, Judge Ruth Kwan of the Los Angeles County Superior Court did not allow this, saying that there was not enough evidence.

== Current operations ==
=== United States ===
The 2025 film Flight Risk, a thriller starring Mark Wahlberg, is a co-production between Icon and Davis Entertainment Company. Gibson directed and co-produced the film along with Davey, John Davis, and John Fox.

As of January 2025 the business registration of Icon Productions LLC in California shows its founding date as 29 May 1997. It lists an individual agent, Vicki Christianson, at 808 Wilshire Blvd, Suite 400, Santa Monica, CA 90401.

=== Australia ===
The 2008–2009 transaction did not include the Australian distribution company and cinemas, which remained as Icon Film Distribution as of February 2019.

The Australian arm became one of the leading independent distributors in Australia.

As of January 2025, the Australian website states that the Dendy Icon Group, comprising Icon Productions, Icon Film Distribution, Dendy Cinemas, and Icon Film Finance, "focuses on quality feature films and alternative content within the Australian and New Zealand markets". The group is still owned by Gibson and Davey.

== Films ==
=== Produced ===
- Hamlet (1990)
- Forever Young (1992)
- Airborne (1993)
- The Man Without a Face (1993)
- Immortal Beloved (1994)
- Maverick (1994)
- Braveheart (1995)
- Dad and Dave: On Our Selection (1995)
- One Eight Seven (1997)
- Anna Karenina (1997)
- FairyTale: A True Story (1997)
- Felicia's Journey (1999)
- An Ideal Husband (1999)
- Payback (1999)
- Bless the Child (2000)
- The Million Dollar Hotel (2000)
- What Women Want (2000)
- We Were Soldiers (2002)
- The Singing Detective (2003)
- Paparazzi (2004)
- The Passion of the Christ (2004)
- Seraphim Falls (2006)
- Apocalypto (2006)
- Infestation (2009)
- Push (2009)
- Edge of Darkness (2010)
- Get the Gringo (2012)
- Stonehearst Asylum (2014)
- Handsome Devil (2016)
- Hacksaw Ridge (2016)
- The Professor and the Madman (2019)
- Flight Risk (2025)
- The Resurrection of the Christ: Part One (2027)
- The Resurrection of the Christ: Part Two (2028)

=== Distributed ===
- Ordinary Decent Criminal (2000)
- Kevin & Perry Go Large (2000)
- The Magic Pudding (2000)
- The Miracle Maker (2000) (as Icon Entertainment International)
- The Little Vampire (2000)
- Y tu mamá también (2001)
- Ghost World (2001)
- Sweet Sixteen (2002)
- Basic (2003)
- Ae Fond Kiss... (2004)
- On a Clear Day (2005)
- Romanzo Criminale (2005)
- Little Fish (2005)
- Black Sheep (2006)
- Butterfly on a Wheel (2007)
- Mr. Magorium's Wonder Emporium (2007)
- The Black Balloon (2008) (as Icon Entertainment International; "presents")
- Hunger (2008)
- Mary and Max (2009)
- Nowhere Boy (2009)
- Black Dynamite (2009)
- Triangle (2009)
- Knowing (2009)
- Buried (2010)
- The Way (2010)
- Coriolanus (2011)
- Oranges and Sunshine (2011)
- A Few Best Men (2012)
- You're Next (2013)
- Postman Pat: The Movie (2014)
- Mr. Holmes (2015)
- Last Cab to Darwin (2015)
- The Neon Demon (2016)
- The Nice Guys (2016)
- Road Games (2016)
- City of Tiny Lights (2016)
- Finding Fatimah (2017)
- The Jungle Bunch (2017)
- Hotel Mumbai (2018)
- Nowhere Special (2020)
- Hive (2021)
- To Olivia (2021)
- Hellboy: The Crooked Man (2024)

== Television ==
- Invincible (2001 film, TBS) – in association with Alliance Atlantis and Qian Yang International
- Clubhouse (2004 series, CBS) – in association with Spelling Television
- Complete Savages (2004 series, ABC) – in association with Nothing Can Go Wrong Now Productions and NBC Universal Television Studio
- Evel Knievel (2004 film, TNT) – in association with Jaffe/Braunstein Films and ApolloProScreen Filmproduktion
- Kevin Hill (2004 series, UPN) – in association with O'Taye Productions and Touchstone Television
- Carrier (2008 series, PBS) – with Carrier Project
