= Francesco De Vito =

Italian actor (born 1970)

- Born: 10 August 1970 (age 55); Taranto, Italy
- Occupation: Actor
- Years active: 2001–present

Francesco De Vito (born 10 August 1970) is an Italian actor. He played Saint Peter in The Passion of the Christ. In 2019, he starred in the television series Heirs of the Night.
