= Kunzea 'Badja Carpet' =

Cultivar of plant

- Genus: Kunzea
- Species: Kunzea badjaensis
- Cultivar: 'Badja Carpet'
- Origin: Natural populations from New South Wales, Australia

Kunzea 'Badja Carpet' is a cultivar of Kunzea badjaensis. It is a low-growing shrub of the family Myrtaceae found in the southeastern tablelands of New South Wales, Australia. It is similar to Kunzea capitata, but it has a lower growth form and white rather than pink flowers. Because of these differences it has been described as a distinct species. The species had previously been known as Kunzea sp. 'Wadbilliga'.

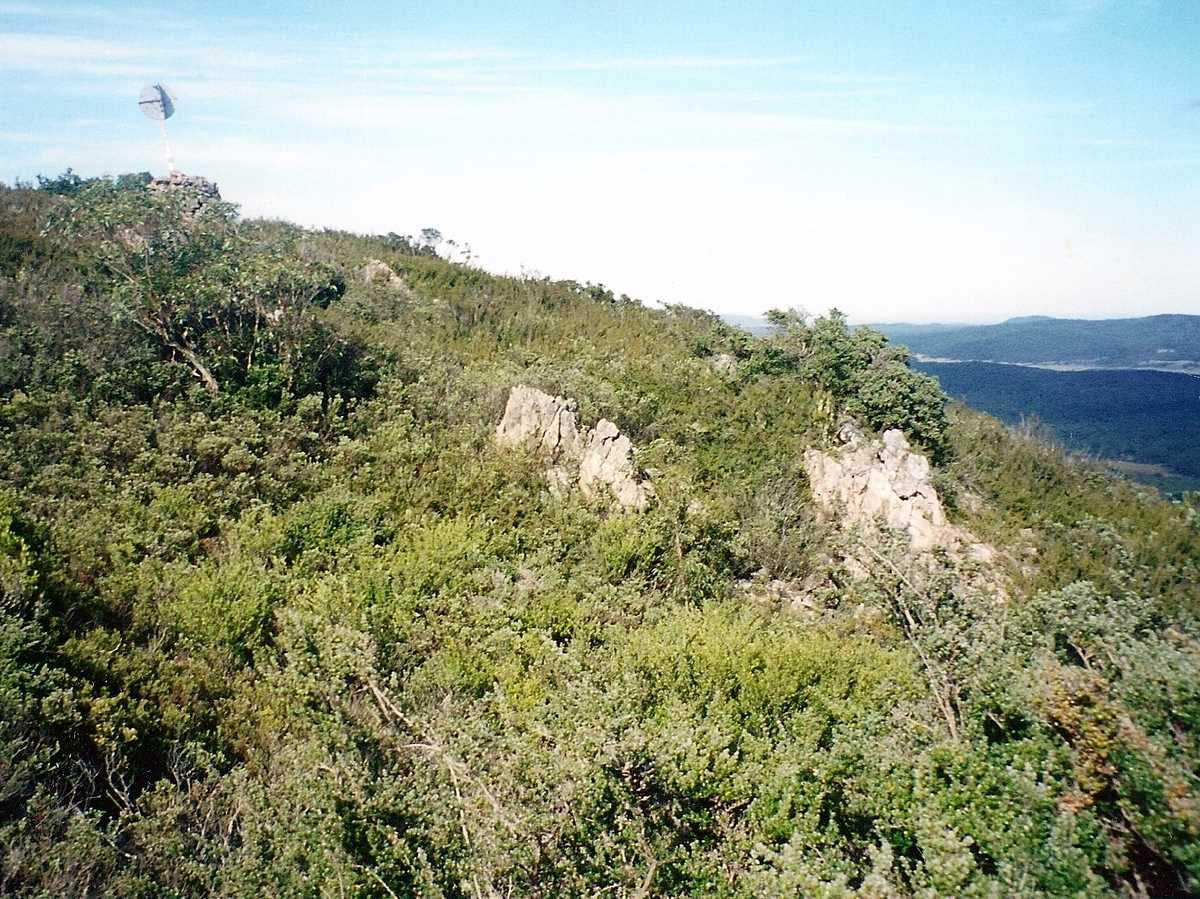
Kunzea sp. "Wadbilliga" at the summit of Big Badja Hill

The habitat of the species is over 1000 metres (3500 ft) above sea level, usually in heathland. It occurs at Big Badja Hill and similar sites in Deua National Park and Wadbilliga National Park, such as Mount Throsby.

The plant community where Kunzea 'Badja Carpet' is found, is known as Southern Montane Heath. Within this community is a group of plants on the escarpment heath. Associate species include Allocasuarina nana, Banksia canei, Brachyloma daphnoides, Euryomyrtus denticulata, Hakea dactyloides, Hibbertia pedunculata, Westringia kydrensis and Isopogon prostratus.

== Description ==
Kunzea 'Badja Carpet' grows to between 20 and 100 cm (8 and 40 in) in height, with a broad spread. The leaves are egg-shaped with the narrower end towards the base, 2–6 mm (0.08–0.2 in) long and 1–3 mm (0.04–0.1 in) wide. White flowers form in summer. The fruiting capsule is around 4 mm (0.2 in) long and 2.4 mm (0.09 in) in diameter and splits open to release the seeds.

== Cultivation ==
This cultivar is commercially available, having been registered with the Australian Cultivar Registration Authority (ACRA) in 1979 after successful propagation at the Australian National Botanic Gardens in Canberra in 1974. This plant is suitable as a frost-resistant groundcover in sunny situations. The fluffy white flowers and red stems of new growth are appealing features. It regenerates well from cuttings.
