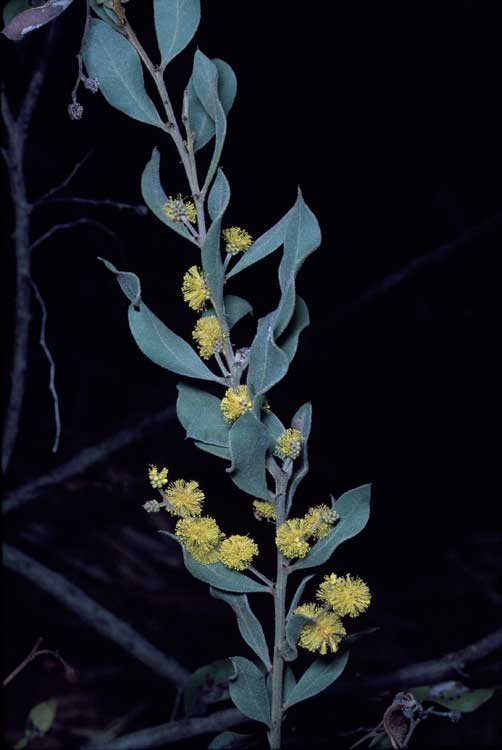
- In the Australian National Botanic Gardens

Scientific classification
- Kingdom: Plantae
- Clade: Tracheophytes
- Clade: Angiosperms
- Clade: Eudicots
- Clade: Rosids
- Order: Fabales
- Family: Fabaceae
- Subfamily: Caesalpinioideae
- Clade: Mimosoid clade
- Genus: Acacia
- Species: A. lucasii

Binomial name
- Acacia lucasii Blakely
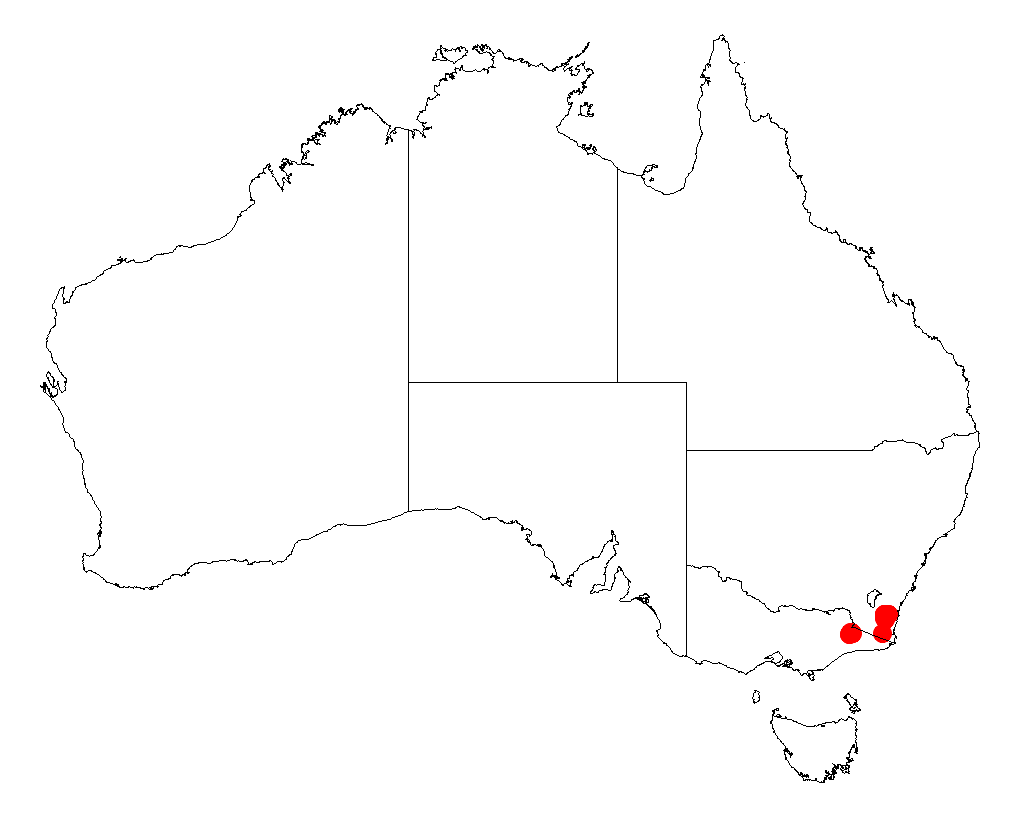
- Occurrence data from AVH

Synonyms
- Racosperma lucasii (Blakely) Pedley

= Acacia lucasii =

Species of legume

Acacia lucasii, commonly known as woolly-bear wattle or Lucas's wattle, is a species of flowering plant in the family Fabaceae and is endemic to the southeastern corner of mainland Australia. It is a shrub with hairy branchlets, crowded elliptic to narrowly elliptic or lance-shaped phyllodes, oblong heads of bright light golden yellow flowers, and hairy, oblong to narrowly oblong, thinly leathery to crusty pods.

== Description ==
Acacia lucasii is a shrub that typically grows to a height of up to 4 m (13 ft) and has young branchlets covered with woolly, rusty brown hairs ageing to silvery white. It phyllodes are crowded, ascending to erect, often slightly asymmetric, elliptic to narrowly elliptic, or lance-shaped, sometimes oblong, 15–30 mm (0.59–1.18 in) long, 6–15 mm (0.24–0.59 in) wide and more or less wavy. The midrib and marginal veins on the phyllodes are prominent, the lateral veins obscure. The flowers are borne in oblong heads in axils or racemes 20–50 mm (0.79–1.97 in) long on the ends of branches, on stout, hairy peduncles 1–4 mm (0.039–0.157 in) long, each head with 20 to 40 bright, light golden yellow flowers. Flowering occurs from August to November, and the pods are oblong to narrowly oblong, more or less straight and straight sided, 25–40 mm (0.98–1.57 in) long, 8–13 mm (0.31–0.51 in) wide and thinly leathery to crusty and densely covered with woolly, rust-coloured hairs. The seeds are more or less oblong, 4–6 mm (0.16–0.24 in) long, somewhat shiny black, with an aril.

== Taxonomy ==
Acacia lucasii was first formally described in 1928 by William Blakely in the Journal and Proceedings of the Royal Society of New South Wales from specimens collected by "Miss M.A. Harnett" near Wadbilliga in 1928. The specific epithet (lucasii) honours Blakely's friend and colleague, A.H.S. Lucas.

== Distribution and habitat ==
Woolly-bear wattle is only known from two areas of the Great Dividing Range. It grows in rocky areas on granite or quartzite, sometimes in heath, or often as an understorey shrub in forest or woodland on the upper Tuross River area in New South Wales and on the Nunniong Plateau in Victoria.
