= Yowrie River =

Coordinates: 36°20′S 149°42′E

Yowrie River Yourie River

Location
- Country: Australia
- State: New South Wales
- Region: South East Corner (IBRA), South Coast
- Local government areas: Bega Valley, Eurobodalla

Physical characteristics
- Source: Badja Range within Wadbilliga National Park
  - location: southwest of Cobargo
  - elevation: 468 m (1,535 ft)
- Mouth: confluence with the Wadbilliga River
  - location: below Belowra Mountain
  - elevation: 150 m (490 ft)
- Length: 19 km (12 mi)

Basin features
- River system: Tuross River catchment
- Tributaries
  - right: Trapyard Creek
- National park: Wadbilliga

Yowrie River, a perennial river of the Tuross River catchment, is located in the upper ranges of the South Coast region of New South Wales, Australia.

== Course and features ==
Yowrie River rises on the eastern slopes of the Badja Range within Wadbilliga National Park, southwest of Cobargo and flows generally northeast, north, northeast, and then north northwest, joined by one minor tributary before reaching its confluence with the Wadbilliga River below Belowra Mountain. The river descends 318 metres (1,043 ft) over its 19 kilometres (12 mi) course.

== See also ==
- Rivers of New South Wales
- List of rivers of New South Wales (L–Z)
- List of rivers of Australia
