= Queens Pound River =

Coordinates: 36°19′S 149°38′E

- Location of mouth in New South Wales

Location
- Country: Australia
- State: New South Wales
- Region: South East Corner (IBRA), South Coast
- Local government areas: Bega Valley

Physical characteristics
- Source: Kybeyan Range within Wadbilliga National Park
  - location: southwest of Yowrie
  - elevation: 1,210 m (3,970 ft)
- Mouth: confluence with the Wadbilliga River
  - location: near Wadbilliga
  - elevation: 324 m (1,063 ft)
- Length: 14 km (8.7 mi)

Basin features
- River system: Tuross River catchment
- National park: Wadbilliga NP

Queens Pound River, a partly perennial river of the Tuross River catchment, is located in the upper ranges of the South Coast region of New South Wales, Australia.

== Course and features ==
Queens Pound River rises on the northern slopes of the Kybeyan Range within Wadbilliga National Park, southwest of the locality of Yowrie and flows generally north and northwest, before reaching its confluence with the Wadbilliga River near the locality of Wadbilliga. The river descends 887 metres (2,910 ft) over its 14 kilometres (8.7 mi) course.

== See also ==
- Rivers of New South Wales
- List of rivers of New South Wales (L–Z)
- List of rivers of Australia
