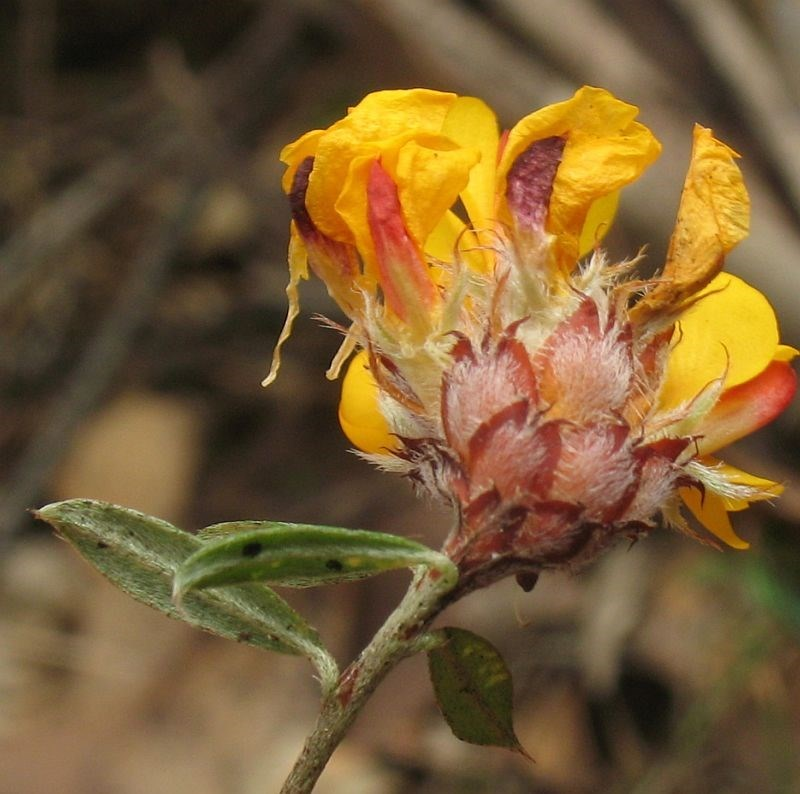
- In Wadbilliga National Park

Scientific classification
- Kingdom: Plantae
- Clade: Tracheophytes
- Clade: Angiosperms
- Clade: Eudicots
- Clade: Rosids
- Order: Fabales
- Family: Fabaceae
- Subfamily: Faboideae
- Genus: Pultenaea
- Species: P. capitellata

Binomial name
- Pultenaea capitellata Sieber ex DC.

= Pultenaea capitellata =

Hard-head bush-pea

Species of flowering plant

Pultenaea capitellata, commonly known as hard-head bush-pea, is a species of flowering plant in the family Fabaceae and is endemic to south-eastern continental Australia. It is a sprawling to prostrate shrub with elliptic to broadly egg-shaped leaves, and yellow to orange flowers with a red to purple keel.

== Description ==
Pultenaea capitellata is a sprawling to prostrate shrub with hairy stems up to 50 cm (20 in) long. The leaves are elliptic to broadly egg-shaped with the narrower end towards the base, 3–12 mm (0.12–0.47 in) long and 2–5 mm (0.079–0.197 in) wide with stipules 1–3 mm (0.039–0.118 in) long at the base. The edges of the leaves are turned down or rolled under and the lower surface is paler than the upper. The flowers are borne in dense clusters near the ends of branchlets with hairy, overlapping, three-lobed bracts. The sepals are 5–7 mm (0.20–0.28 in) long with pale-coloured, silky hairs and linear bracteoles 2–3.5 mm (0.079–0.138 in) long at the base. The standard petal is 7–8 mm (0.28–0.31 in) long and yellow to orange with reddish markings, the wings are yellow to orange and the keel is red to purple. Flowering occurs from November to January and the fruit is a flat pod about 6 mm (0.24 in) long surrounded by the remains of the sepals.

== Taxonomy and naming ==
Pultenaea capitellata was first formally described in 1825 by Augustin Pyramus de Candolle in his Prodromus Systematis Naturalis Regni Vegetabilis from an unpublished description by Franz Sieber. The specific epithet (capitellata) means "a small head".

== Distribution and habitat ==
Hard-head bush-pea grows in swampy heath or in forest on the coast and tablelands south from the Kanangra-Boyd National Park in New South Wales to alpine areas of north-eastern Victoria.
