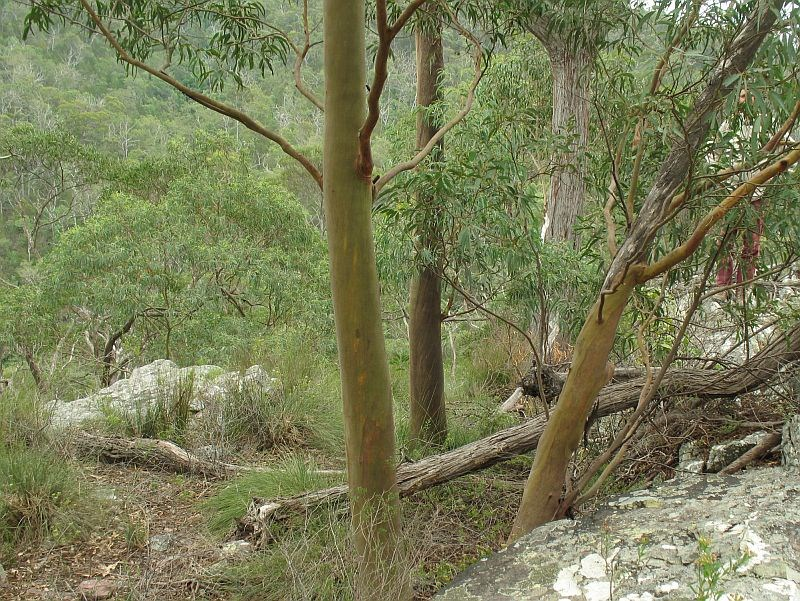
- Eucalyptus wilcoxii near Brogo Dam

Scientific classification
- Kingdom: Plantae
- Clade: Embryophytes
- Clade: Tracheophytes
- Clade: Spermatophytes
- Clade: Angiosperms
- Clade: Eudicots
- Clade: Rosids
- Order: Myrtales
- Family: Myrtaceae
- Genus: Eucalyptus
- Species: E. wilcoxii

Binomial name
- Eucalyptus wilcoxii Boland & Kleinig

= Eucalyptus wilcoxii =

Deua gum

Species of eucalyptus

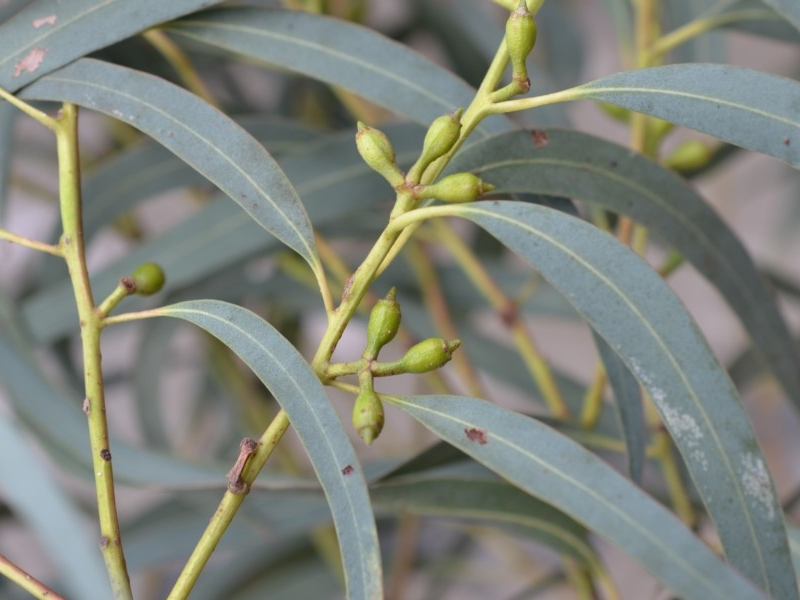
Flower buds

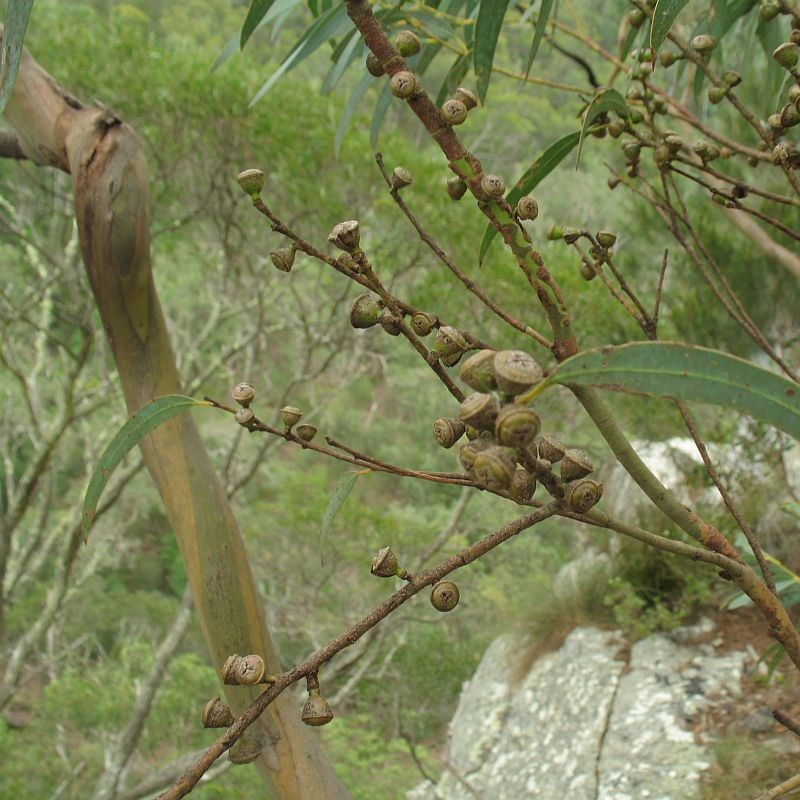
Fruit

Eucalyptus wilcoxii, commonly known as Deua gum, is a species of mallee or tree that is endemic to south-eastern New South Wales. It has smooth bark, lance-shaped adult leaves, flower buds in groups of three, white flowers and cup-shaped or bell-shaped fruit.

== Description ==
Eucalyptus wilcoxii is a mallee, sometimes a tree, that typically grows to a height of 10–15 m (33–49 ft) and forms a lignotuber. It has smooth grey, copper-coloured or greenish bark that is shed in long ribbons. Young plants and coppice regrowth have bluish green leaves that are paler on the lower surface, narrow elliptical, 25–60 mm (0.98–2.36 in) long and 5–18 mm (0.20–0.71 in) wide. Adult leaves are the same shade of green on both sides, lance-shaped to curved, 55–155 mm (2.2–6.1 in) long and 7–22 mm (0.28–0.87 in) wide, tapering to a petiole 5–17 mm (0.20–0.67 in) long. The flower buds are arranged in leaf axils in groups of three on an unbranched peduncle 2–6 mm (0.079–0.236 in) long, the individual buds on pedicels 2–3 mm (0.079–0.118 in) long. Mature buds are pear-shaped, cylindrical to oval, about 6 mm (0.24 in) long and 4 mm (0.16 in) wide with a beaked or conical operculum 2–3 mm (0.079–0.118 in) long. Flowering has been observed in March and the flowers are white. The fruit is a woody cup-shaped, bell-shaped or cylindrical capsule 4–6 mm (0.16–0.24 in) long and 5–7 mm (0.20–0.28 in) wide with the valves slightly protruding.

== Taxonomy and naming ==
Eucalyptus wilcoxii was first formally described in 1987 by Douglas John Boland and David Arthur Kleinig in the journal Brunonia from specimens collected by Boland on the northern slope of Mother Woila Mountain in Deua National Park in 1982. The specific epithet (wilcoxii) honours Michael David Wilcox who made one of the first collections of this species.

== Distribution and habitat ==
Deua gum grows in poor soil on steep scree slopes near the headwaters of the Tuross and Moruya Rivers in the Deua and Wadbilliga National Parks.
