= Back River (Cooma-Monaro) =

River in Australia

Coordinates: 36°20′S 149°32′E

Location
- Country: Australia
- State: New South Wales
- Region: South East Corner (IBRA), Monaro, South Coast
- Local government area: Cooma-Monaro

Physical characteristics
- Source: Kybeyan Range, Great Dividing Range
  - location: Wadbilliga National Park
  - elevation: 1,180 m (3,870 ft)
- Mouth: confluence with the Tuross River
  - location: Two River Plain
  - elevation: 977 m (3,205 ft)
- Length: 8 km (5.0 mi)

Basin features
- River system: Tuross River
- National park: Wadbilliga NP

The Back River, a perennial stream of the Tuross River catchment, is located in the Monaro and South Coast regions of New South Wales, Australia.

== Course and features ==
Back River rises of the eastern slopes of the Kybeyan Range, part of the Great Dividing Range, on the western edge of Wadbilliga National Park, approximately 16.5 kilometres (10.3 mi) west southwest of Yowrie. The river flows generally north northwest, and south by west, before reaching its confluence with the Tuross River near Two River Plain. The river descends 206 metres (676 ft) over its 8 kilometres (5.0 mi) course.

== See also ==
- Rivers of New South Wales
- List of rivers of New South Wales (A-K)
- List of rivers of Australia
