= Hibbertia pachynemidium =

Scientific classification
- Kingdom: Plantae
- Clade: Tracheophytes
- Clade: Angiosperms
- Clade: Eudicots
- Order: Dilleniales
- Family: Dilleniaceae
- Genus: Hibbertia
- Species: H. pachynemidium

Binomial name
- Hibbertia pachynemidium Toelken

Species of plant

Hibbertia pachynemidium is a species of flowering plant in the family Dilleniaceae, and is endemic to southern New South Wales. It is a small, mat-forming shrub with oblong to lance-shaped or elliptic leaves and yellow flowers with eight to seventeen stamens arranged around three carpels.

== Description ==
Hibbertia pachynemidium is a mat-forming shrub that typically grows to a height of up to 15 cm (5.9 in) with glabrous foliage, except on new growth. The leaves are oblong to lance-shaped or elliptic, 2.5–3.8 mm (0.098–0.150 in) long and 0.6–0.8 mm (0.024–0.031 in) wide on a petiole about 0.2 mm (0.0079 in) long. The flowers are arranged singly on the ends of the branches and short side shoots on a peduncle 3.5–5 mm (0.14–0.20 in) long. There are bracts 1.8–2.3 mm (0.071–0.091 in) long at the base of the flowers. The five sepals are joined at the base, the three outer lobes 1.8–2.7 mm (0.071–0.106 in) wide and the inner lobes slightly broader. The five petals are oblong to egg-shaped with the narrower end towards the base, yellow, 6–8 mm (0.24–0.31 in) long with eight to seventeen stamens and a few staminodes arranged around the three carpels, each carpel with two to four ovules.

== Taxonomy ==
Hibbertia pachynemidium was first formally described in 2013 by Hellmut R. Toelken in the Journal of the Adelaide Botanic Gardens from specimens collected by Roy Pullen on Big Badja Mountain in 1973. The specific epithet (pachynemidium) is the diminutive form of Greek words meaning "broad thread", and refers to the thickened stamen filaments.

== Distribution and habitat ==
This hibbertia grows in eucalypt woodland on the Southern Tablelands of New South Wales.

== See also ==
- List of Hibbertia species
