= Clawfoot =

Clawfoot may refer to:

- Clawfoot tub, a style of bathtub
- Clawfoot (film), a 2023 American thriller film
- Paw feet, furniture legs resembling animal feet
- Pes cavus, a medical condition
