= Milo Gibson =

American actor (born 1990)

- Born: November 16, 1990 (age 35); Australia
- Occupation: Actor
- Years active: 2016–present
- Children: 1
- Father: Mel Gibson
- Relatives: Donal Gibson (uncle); Hutton Gibson (grandfather); Eva Mylott (great-grandmother)

Milo Gibson (born November 16, 1990) is an American actor. He is the son of Mel Gibson. He is known for his roles in All the Devil's Men, Breaking & Exiting, Gangster Land, and Hacksaw Ridge.

== Biography ==
Gibson was born in Australia and raised in Malibu, California. Gibson worked as an electrician prior to starting his acting career. Gibson made his film debut in his father's film Hacksaw Ridge.

He had a major role as Lt. Johnny Kent in the 2018 film Hurricane, which was also released under the titles Hurricane: 303 Squadron, 303: Bitwa o Anglię in Poland and Mission of Honor in the United States.

== Filmography ==
Film roles
Year	Title	Role	Notes
2016	Girls Rule	Student	Short film
2016	Hacksaw Ridge	Lucky Ford	
2017	Gangster Land	Al Capone	
2017	The Tribes of Palos Verdes	Chad	
2018	Hurricane	John A. Kent	
2018	Breaking & Exiting	Harry	
2018	All the Devil's Men	Jack Collins	
2019	The Outpost	Captain Robert Yllescas	
2020	Borat Subsequent Moviefilm	Himself	Uncredited cameo
2021	Under the Stadium Lights	Chad Mitchell	
2022	Manifest West	Dave Hayes	
2023	Clawfoot	Leo	
2026	The Sheriff	Tulip	
TBA	Vested †		Post-production
