= Adam Huber =

American actor (born 1987)

- Born: May 8, 1987 (age 39); Hollidaysburg, Pennsylvania, U.S.
- Education: Pennsylvania State University
- Occupations: Actor; model; podcaster
- Years active: 2007–present
- Spouse: Rachel Rigler (m. 2025)

Adam Huber (born May 8, 1987) is an American actor and model. He is known for playing Liam Ridley in the CW series Dynasty from 2018 to 2022, for which he was nominated for a Teen Choice Award for Choice TV Drama Actor in 2019.

== Early life ==
Huber was born in Hollidaysburg, Pennsylvania, the son of David and Denise Huber. He graduated from Hollidaysburg Area High School in 2006 and studied Business Management at Pennsylvania State University. There, he enrolled in an introduction to theatre course and, shortly after, auditioned for his first school play. Huber moved to New York City to pursue acting and modeling. Huber did cater bartending for weddings, private events, and mixology companies for about 10 years.

== Career ==
In 2012, Huber landed his first acting role in an episode of the CBS police procedural series, Unforgettable. Throughout the mid-to-late 2010s, Huber appeared in a string of minor roles in series such as, New Girl, Awkward, Unreal: The Faith Diaries, Animal Kingdom, and The Good Place, as well as a string of Lifetime originally movies including, Blood, Sweat, and Lies, Room for Murder, and Nancy Surveillance. He played Chris in the 2018 film, Breaking & Exiting.

In 2018, Huber landed the break-out role of Liam Ridley in Dynasty, a reboot based on the 1980s prime time soap opera of the same name. Huber recurred in the first two seasons of the show before being promoted to series regular for the third season. Huber was testing for a role on an upcoming NYPD Blue reboot when the offer was made during filming of season two. In 2019, Huber was nominated for a Teen Choice Award for Choice Drama TV Actor.

In September 2023, Huber launched Hazel and Blue Podcast with his significant other, Rachel Rigler.

== Personal life ==
Huber charitably supports the National Multiple Sclerosis Society.

Huber previously dated Jordan Danger, who wrote the screenplay for Breaking & Exiting. Since 2021, Huber has been in a relationship with TikTok influencer Rachel Rigler. They were engaged at the Colosseum in Rome, Italy, on April 18, 2024. Huber and Rigler got married on September 23, 2025, at Brown Beach House in Trogir, Croatia.

== Filmography ==
=== Film ===
Year	Title	Role	Notes
2015	Head Space	Pizza delivery guy	Short film
2016	Do You Take This Man	Brunch waiter	
2016	Do Over	Organic food store clerk	
2016	Rose-Colored	Ben	
2018	Book Club	Bartender	
2018	Breaking & Exiting	Chris	
2019	Better Days	Matt	
2019	First Love	Robert	

=== Television ===
Year	Title	Role	Notes
2012	Unforgettable	Frat boy	Episode: "Brotherhood"
2014	New Girl	Geoff	Episode: "Thanksgiving IV"
2015	Awkward	College jock #2	2 episodes
2016	Unreal: The Faith Diaries	Sterling Cole	Web series; 2 episodes
2016	Animal Kingdom	Dave	Episode: "Flesh Is Weak"
2016	StartUp	Shad	Episode: "Seed Money"
2016	The Good Place	Kirk	Episode: "Flying"
2016	Mary + Jane	Cater waiter	Episode: "Sn**chelorette"
2017	Gamer's Guide to Pretty Much Everything	Cowboy Cody	Episode: "The Rodeo"
2018	Blood, Sweat, and Lies	Trey	Television film
2018	Room for Murder	Ryan	Television film
2018	Nanny Surveillance	Scott	Television film
2018	Polygonerz	Marcel	
2018–2022	Dynasty	Liam Ridley	Recurring role (seasons 1–2); main role (seasons 3–5); Nominated—Teen Choice Award for Choice TV Drama Actor (2019)
2024	Chicago Med	Jordan Moore III	Episode: "These Are Not the Droids You Are Looking For"
2026	Maximum Pleasure Guaranteed	Brian	Episode: "Flighting"
