= Pocahontas II: Journey to a New World =

1998 Disney direct-to-video sequel to Pocahontas (1995)

- Home video release poster
- Directed by: Tom Ellery; Bradley Raymond
- Written by: Allen Estrin; Cindy Marcus; Flip Kobler
- Produced by: Leslie Hough
- Starring: Irene Bedard; Billy Zane; Jim Cummings; Donal Gibson; David Ogden Stiers; Linda Hunt; Jean Stapleton; Russell Means; Finola Hughes; Brad Garrett
- Music by: Lennie Niehaus
- Production company: Walt Disney Television Animation
- Distributed by: Buena Vista Home Entertainment (Note: Distributed under the Walt Disney Home Video imprint)
- Release date: August 25, 1998
- Running time: 72 minutes
- Countries: United States; Canada; Australia
- Language: English

Pocahontas II: Journey to a New World is a 1998 American direct-to-video animated musical historical drama film and the sequel to the 1995 Disney film Pocahontas. While the first film dealt with her meeting with John Smith and the arrival of the British settlers in Jamestown, the sequel focuses on Pocahontas's journey to England with John Rolfe to negotiate for peace between the two nations, although her death is omitted from the film's ending. Pocahontas II: Journey to a New World was released by Buena Vista Home Entertainment on August 25, 1998.

== Plot ==
In London, 1610, three years later, John Smith is ambushed by a group of soldiers with a warrant for his arrest and presumed dead in the ensuing confrontation; Governor Ratcliffe being a personal friend to King James, lied and framed Smith as the traitor in a plot to declare war against the Powhatan Nation and get hold of the gold he still believes them to possess, all while avoiding punishment for his own crimes. In order to prevent war, the King sends a young diplomat, John Rolfe, to bring Chief Powhatan to England for negotiations. In the New World, Pocahontas, Powhatan's daughter, mourns John Smith's death but is eventually able to move on. John Rolfe soon arrives, greeted by English civilians, who by now have settled in Jamestown, and a curious Pocahontas. Rolfe eventually speaks with Powhatan, but he refuses to accompany him to England, so Pocahontas goes in her father's stead, believing that she can bring about peace between the two nations. Powhatan sends a bodyguard, Uttamatomakkin (Uti) to accompany Pocahontas. Rolfe and Pocahontas have a rocky start, but gradually warm up to each other.

In England, Rolfe leaves Pocahontas at his mansion and meets with King James and Queen Anne, but James refuses to meet with Pocahontas despite Rolfe's pleas. Instead, per Ratcliffe's suggestion, James invites both Rolfe and Pocahontas to an upcoming ball and promises that if Pocahontas impresses him by acting "civilised", he will prevent the armada from sailing to Jamestown, but if she does not, he will declare war. Knowing that Ratcliffe deliberately manipulated the King, Rolfe and his maid, Mrs. Jenkins, educate Pocahontas in the ways of British etiquette to prepare her. At the ball, Pocahontas wins over the King and Queen with flattery and almost manages to prevent war, but a bear-baiting arranged by Ratcliffe and greatly enjoyed by the snobbish nobility infuriates Pocahontas and she openly accuses the King of savage behaviour. With Ratcliffe whispering in his ear, James angrily orders Pocahontas and Uti arrested and imprisoned in the Tower of London, and declares war on the Powhatan tribe.

At his home, a despondent Rolfe is approached by a hooded stranger who helps him break Pocahontas and Uti out of the tower and take them to an inn, where the man reveals himself to be John Smith. Smith implores Pocahontas to stay hidden with him, but she instead takes Rolfe's advice and decides to try and stop the war one last time. She openly confronts the King in the palace and reveals Smith, thus proving that Ratcliffe had been lying the entire time. Realizing Ratcliffe's treachery, James sends a battalion, among them Pocahontas, Smith, Rolfe, Uti, and their animal friends, to stop the armada and detain Ratcliffe. They are successful in stopping the ships before they can set sail, but Ratcliffe refuses to give up and tries to kill Pocahontas. Smith appears and fights Ratcliffe one-on-one until Ratcliffe draws a gun, but before he can pull the trigger, Rolfe hits him overboard with the ship's mast. Ratcliffe makes it back to the port, where he is arrested by the King.

Smith receives a royal pardon and his own ship from the King as a sign of apology. Pocahontas and Rolfe, meanwhile, appear on the verge of admitting that they love each other. Before they can, Smith appears and implores Pocahontas to accompany him on his new journeys around the world, but Pocahontas chooses otherwise and she and Smith part ways as friends. As Pocahontas later prepares to return to Jamestown, she finds Rolfe waiting for her on the ship, having chosen to go and live with her in Jamestown, with Uti remaining in London in his stead. They kiss as the ship sails into the sunset.

== Voice cast ==
- Irene Bedard (Judy Kuhn singing) as Pocahontas. Desiring everlasting peace between England and her people, she travels to London as a diplomat, falling in love with John Rolfe on the way.
- Billy Zane as John Rolfe: the diplomat sent to bring Chief Powhatan to England and who falls in love with Pocahontas to the point that he stands up against Ratcliffe and King James.
- Donal Gibson as Captain John Smith: Pocahontas's one time love, presumed dead after a confrontation with Ratcliffe. He later resurfaces to aid Pocahontas and John Rolfe against Ratcliffe. Donal replaces his older brother, Mel, who voiced Smith in the first film.
- David Ogden Stiers as Governor Ratcliffe: the main villain. Having lied to King James about the events in Jamestown, Ratcliffe becomes more determined than ever to go to war with the Powhatans in order to find his falsely speculated treasure. Due to his friendship and influence over the King, Ratcliffe is the ruler of England in all but name until his lies were exposed and is arrested.
- John Kassir as Meeko: Pocahontas's pet raccoon, ever looking for fun.
- Russell Means as Chief Powhatan: Pocahontas's father and chief of the Powhatans. He refuses to travel to England, so Pocahontas goes in his stead.
- Frank Welker as Flit: Pocahontas's hummingbird friend, now warmer towards strangers than before.
- Linda Hunt as Grandmother Willow: Pocahontas's spiritual guardian. She advises Pocahontas to go to England for peace.
- Danny Mann as Percy: once Ratcliffe's pet dog, now living with Pocahontas and Meeko in Jamestown.
- Michelle St. John as Nakoma: Pocahontas's best friend.
- Jim Cummings as King James: King of Scotland, England, and Ireland. While well-meaning, he is portrayed as a simple-minded buffoon who is very easily manipulated by Ratcliffe. He arrests Ratcliffe once he discovers his lies.
- Finola Hughes as Queen Anne: James's wife, somewhat more intelligent and open than her husband.
- Jean Stapleton as Mrs. Jenkins: John Rolfe's well-meaning housemaid.
- Brad Garrett as Uttamatomakkin: Pocahontas's bodyguard, sent by Powhatan to watch over her. He is nicknamed "Uti".
- Gregg Rainwater as Nakoma's husband.

== Production ==
Production took two years and occurred in the United States, Canada, and Japan.

== Release ==
The film was originally released on VHS as part of the Walt Disney Home Video collection. Two years later, it was re-released on VHS, as well as on DVD, on September 5, 2000, as part of the Walt Disney Gold Classic Collection.

On August 21, 2012, the film was released as part of a 2-Movie Collection with its prequel, Pocahontas, in both DVD and Blu-ray formats. Then on February 28, 2017, the film was re-released as part of a 2-Movie Collection with its prequel in a Blu-ray / Digital HD combo.

== Reception ==
On Rotten Tomatoes, the film holds an approval rating of 38% based on 8 reviews and an average rating of 5.2/10. Joe Leydon of Variety called it "too bland and formulaic" for adults but said that children will likely enjoy it. TV Guide rated the film 2/5 stars. The reviewer called it "fairly well made" but said it "suffers from the usual defects of an uncompelling plot and weak songs". At Entertainment Weekly, Michael Sauter rated it C+ and called it "standard yet pleasing fare for the preschool set".

== Music ==
The soundtrack of the movie was released on November 23, 2009, from the Walt Disney Records.

All tracks are written by Marty Panzer and Larry Grossman.

No.	Title	Performer(s)	Length
1.	"Where Do I Go From Here?"	Judy Kuhn
2.	"What a Day in London"	Judy Kuhn and cast
3.	"Wait 'Till He Sees You"	Jean Stapleton & Billy Zane
4.	"Things Are Not What They Appear"	David Ogden Stiers
5.	"Between Two Worlds"	Judy Kuhn & Billy Zane
