= Wadbilliga River =

Coordinates: 36°12′S 149°46′E

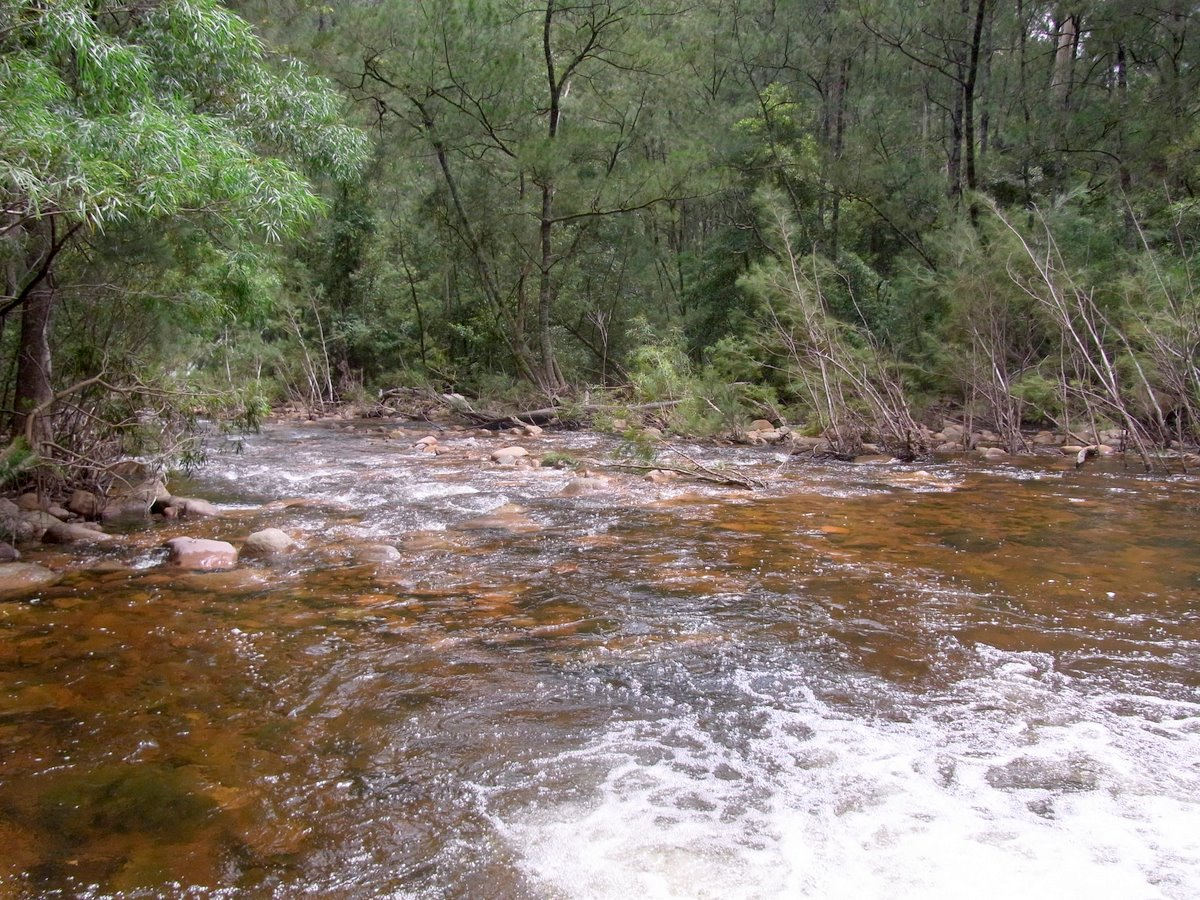
- Wadbilliga River, in Wadbilliga National Park, 2011

Location
- Country: Australia
- State: New South Wales
- Region: South East Corner (IBRA), South Coast
- Municipality: Bega Valley

Physical characteristics
- Source: Kybeyan Range, Great Dividing Range
  - location: West of Cobargo
  - elevation: 668 m (2,192 ft)
- Mouth: Confluence with the Tuross River
  - location: East of the locale of Belowa
  - elevation: 73 m (240 ft)
- Length: 33.8 km (21.0 mi)

Basin features
- River system: Tuross River
- Tributaries
  - right: Queens Pound River, Lake Creek (New South Wales), Yowrie River, Brassknocker Creek
- National park: Wadbilliga

The Wadbilliga River is a perennial stream of the Tuross River catchment that is located in the South Coast region of New South Wales, Australia.

== Course and features ==
The Wadbilliga River rises on the western slopes of Mount Wadbilliga, located within Wadbilliga National Park and part of the Kybeyan Range, within the Great Dividing Range. The river flows generally north, east northeast, east by south, and then northeast, before reaching its confluence with the Tuross River, east of the locale of Belowa. The river descends 594 metres (1,949 ft) over its 33.8 kilometres (21.0 mi) course.

== See also ==
- List of rivers of Australia
- List of rivers of New South Wales (L–Z)
- Rivers of New South Wales
