= Do You Take This Man =

- Directed by: Joshua Tunick
- Written by: Joshua Tunick
- Produced by: Eric Kops; Dave Perkal; Joshua Tunick
- Starring: Anthony Rapp; Jonathan Bennett
- Cinematography: Dave Perkal
- Edited by: Joshua Tunick
- Music by: John Kimbrough
- Distributed by: Breaking Glass Pictures
- Release dates: 26 July 2016 (Outfest LA); 7 July 2017 (US)
- Running time: 92 minutes
- Country: United States
- Language: English

Do You Take This Man is a 2016 American romantic drama film directed by Joshua Tunick, starring Anthony Rapp and Jonathan Bennett.

== Cast ==
- Anthony Rapp as Daniel
- Jonathan Bennett as Christopher
- Alyson Hannigan as Rachael
- Thomas Dekker as Bradley
- Mackenzie Astin as Jacob
- Alona Tal as Emma
- Hutchi Hancock as Summer
- Marla Sokoloff as Zoe
- Lee Garlington as Esther
- Sam Anderson as Steven
- Adam Huber as Brunch Waiter

== Release ==
The film premiered at LA Outfest on 26 July 2016. It was released to theatres on 7 July 2017 and on VOD and DVD on 11 July.

== Reception ==
Serena Donadoni of The Village Voice wrote that Tunick "infuses his debut narrative feature with a sunny optimism that gives an emotional drama the air of escapism."

Gary Goldstein of Los Angeles Times wrote, "That it involves gay nuptials makes this sluggish talkfest feel like even more of a missed opportunity; something livelier and more compelling was in order."

Stephen Farber of The Hollywood Reporter wrote that while the cast "helps to make the weak drama more watchable than it has any right to be", the "seasoned pros can only do so much to animate the earnest, antiseptic script."
