= All the Devil's Men =

2018 British action thriller film

- Film poster
- Directed by: Matthew Hope
- Written by: Matthew Hope
- Produced by: Amory Leader; Hannah Leader
- Starring: Milo Gibson; Sylvia Hoeks; Gbenga Akinnagbe; William Fichtner
- Cinematography: Robin Whenary
- Edited by: Emma Gaffney
- Music by: Amory Leader; Simon Williams
- Distributed by: Saban Films
- Release date: 7 December 2018 (United States)
- Running time: 100 minutes
- Country: United Kingdom
- Languages: English; Russian
- Box office: $65,829

All the Devil's Men is a 2018 British action thriller film written and directed by Matthew Hope and starring Milo Gibson, Sylvia Hoeks, Gbenga Akinnagbe, and William Fichtner.

== Plot ==
Jack Collins is a war junkie and former Navy SEAL turned bounty hunter who tracks down terrorists as part of the CIA's outsourcing to private companies. Battling personal demons, the powers think that he is becoming a liability so his CIA handler Leigh offers him one last chance to keep fighting, sending him to London for a job. There, he finds himself part of a three-man team tasked with hunting down a disavowed CIA Operative called McKnight before he procures a WMD from Russian gangsters and disappears. Together, Collins, Brennan and Samuelson find themselves locked in urban tactical combat with a former colleague, Deighton, and his private army, hired by McKnight as protection. Both sides fight smart and as casualties and betrayal mounts on both sides, Collins refuses to be defeated as he battles his way to an explosive climax.

== Cast ==
- Milo Gibson as Jack Collins
- Sylvia Hoeks as Leigh Allen
- Gbenga Akinnagbe as Pete Samuelson
- William Fichtner as Mike Brennan
- Joseph Millson as Tony Deighton
- Elliot Cowan as Terry McKnight
- Perry Fitzpatrick as Jimmy Logan
- Yavor Baharov as Chief Oleg Velibor
- Rinat Khismatouline as Mark Ivan

== Release ==
The film was released theatrically in the United States on 7 December 2018. It was released on Blu-Ray, DVD and digital platforms in the U.S. on 5 February 2019.

== Reception ==
The film has a 23% rating on Rotten Tomatoes. Barbara Shulgasser-Parker of Common Sense Media awarded the film two stars out of five.

Dennis Harvey of Variety gave the film a negative review and wrote, "There’s a lot of double- and triple-crossing, culminating in a fadeout that seems to go one plot twist over the line of narrative coherency."

Frank Scheck of The Hollywood Reporter also gave the film a negative review and wrote, "The problem is that the pic is such an utterly routine, formulaic and forgettable example of its genre that watching it becomes an exercise in endurance."
