= Hutton Gibson =

American writer (1918–2020)

- Born: August 26, 1918; Peekskill, New York, U.S.
- Died: May 11, 2020 (aged 101); Thousand Oaks, California, U.S.
- Occupation: Writer
- Spouses: Anne Patricia Reilly (m. 1942; died 1990); Teddy Joye Hicks (m. 2002; div. 2012)
- Children: 11, including Mel and Donal
- Mother: Eva Mylott
- Relatives: Milo Gibson (grandson)

Hutton Peter Gibson (Irish: Hutún Peadar Ó Gibealláin; August 26, 1918 – May 11, 2020) was an American Holocaust denier, writer on sedevacantism, World War II veteran, the Jeopardy! grand champion for 1968, and the father of 11 children, one of whom is the actor and director Mel Gibson.

Gibson was a critic both of the post-Vatican II Catholic Church and of those Traditionalist Catholics who reject sedevacantism, such as the Society of Saint Pius X. He claimed that the Second Vatican Council was "a Masonic plot backed by the Jews".

== Early life and family ==
Gibson was born in Peekskill, New York, the son of businessman John Hutton Gibson (1884–1937) and Australian opera singer Eva Mylott (1875–1920). His maternal grandparents were Irish Catholic immigrants to Australia, while his father, who was from a wealthy tobacco-producing family from the American South, also had Irish Catholic ancestry. He was raised in Chicago. His mother died when he was two years old and his father died when he was nineteen. Gibson supported his younger brother, Alexis, who died in 1967. He graduated from high school early, at age 15, and ranked third in his class.

According to Wensley Clarkson's biography of Mel Gibson, Hutton Gibson studied for the priesthood in a Chicago seminary which was operated by the Society of the Divine Word but he left the seminary because he considered the modernist theological doctrines which were being taught there disgusting. However, in 2003, Gibson stated that he really left the seminary because he did not want to be sent to New Guinea or the Philippines as a missionary. Instead, he found work with Western Union and the Civilian Conservation Corps. He also contributed to and edited the newsletter "The Pointer" while he worked in Wisconsin for the Civilian Conservation Corps from 1938 to 1939.

After serving with the U.S. Army as a Signal Corps officer at the Battle of Guadalcanal, Gibson married Irish-born Anne Patricia Reilly on May 1, 1944, at the Catholic parish church of Our Lady of Good Counsel in Brooklyn, New York City. They had ten children and adopted another one after their arrival in Australia. As of 2003, Gibson had 48 grandchildren and 15 great-grandchildren. His wife died in December 1990. In January 2002, he married Teddy Joye Hicks, but in 2012 Gibson filed for divorce due to irreconcilable differences. From early 2006, he resided in Westmoreland County, Pennsylvania, near Pittsburgh after moving from Australia to Houston, Texas, in 1999, and to Summersville, West Virginia, in 2003.

== Railroad lawsuit and move to Australia ==
In the 1960s, Gibson worked for New York Central Railroad. In the early morning hours of December 11, 1964, he slipped off a steel platform which was covered in oil and snow and injured his back. A work injury lawsuit followed and finally reached court on February 7, 1968. Seven days later, Gibson was awarded $145,000 (equivalent to $1,340,000 in 2025) by the jury. Gibson paid his debts and attorney's fees and later that year, he relocated his family, first to Ireland, then to Australia.

Gibson said in 2003 that the move to his mother's native country was undertaken because he believed that the Australian Army would reject his oldest son for the Australian Vietnam War draft, unlike the U.S. Army. Because of his back injuries, Gibson sought retraining in a new career. He was encouraged to become a computer programmer after IQ testing placed him in the genius range.

At the October 1976 Annual General Meeting of the Latin Mass Society of Australia, Gibson resigned as secretary after loudly and continually claiming that the See of Peter was vacant due to Pope John XXIII's convention of the Second Vatican Council, and accusing subsequent popes of therefore being heretical antipopes. He later founded an organisation called the Alliance for Catholic Truth.

== Quiz show contestant ==
In 1968, Gibson appeared on the Art Fleming-hosted version of the game show Jeopardy! as "Red Gibson, a railroad brakeman from South Ozone Park, New York". Gibson won $4,680 and retired undefeated after five shows, in accordance with the rules then in use on the show. He was invited back to appear in the 1968 Tournament of Champions, where he became the year's grand champion, winning slightly over one thousand dollars more, as well as a two-person cruise to the West Indies. Art Fleming observed on the October 18, 1968, episode that the Jeopardy! staff had difficulty informing Gibson about his invitation, for Gibson had decamped with his family to County Tipperary, Ireland.

Gibson later participated in many Australian quiz shows, including Big Nine with Athol Guy and Ford Superquiz with Bert Newton. In 1986, The Sydney Morning Herald reported that Gibson had recently won $100,000 and an automobile in a TV quiz program.

== Beliefs ==
Gibson was an outspoken critic of the doctrine, leadership, and practice that arose after the death of Pope Pius XII and the Second Vatican Council. He disseminated his views in a quarterly newsletter called The War is Now! and self-published three collections of these periodicals: Is the Pope Catholic?, The Enemy is Here!, and The Enemy is Still Here!

Gibson was especially critical of Pope John Paul II, whom he once described as "Garrulous Karolus the Koran-Kisser". His allegation that the Pope kissed the Quran is corroborated by a FIDES News Service report of June 1, 1999, which quotes the Chaldean Catholic Patriarch, Raphael I Bidawid, as having confirmed to the news service that he was personally present when John Paul II kissed the text, which is sacred to Muslims:

On May 14th I was received by the Pope, together with a delegation composed of the Shi'ite imam of Khadum mosque and the Sunni president of the council of administration of the Iraqi Islamic Bank. There was also a representative of the Iraqi ministry of religion. ... At the end of the audience the Pope bowed to the Muslim holy book, the Qu'ran, presented to him by the delegation, and he kissed it as a sign of respect. The photo of that gesture has been shown repeatedly on Iraqi television and it demonstrates that the Pope not only is aware of the suffering of the Iraqi people, but he also has great respect for Islam.

Gibson also used his newsletter to argue against Feeneyism. At the January 2004 We The People conference, Gibson advocated that the states should secede from the Federal government of the United States and the United States public debt should be abolished.

One week before Mel Gibson's The Passion of the Christ (2004) was released in American film theaters, Hutton Gibson told radio talk show host Steve Feuerstein that the Holocaust was fabricated and "mostly fictional". He said that the Jews had simply emigrated to other countries rather than having been killed, a view which observers described as Holocaust denial. He claimed that census statistics prove there were more Jews in Europe after World War II than before. Gibson said that certain Jews advocate a global religion and one world government.

In his interview for The New York Times Magazine article, Gibson dismissed historical accounts that six million Jews were exterminated:

"Go and ask an undertaker or the guy who operates the crematorium what it takes to get rid of a dead body," he said. "It takes twenty liters of petrol and 20 minutes. Now, six million?" Across the table, Joye [Gibson's wife] suddenly looked up from her plate. ... She had kept quiet most of the day, so it was a surprise when she cheerfully piped in. "There weren't even that many Jews in all of Europe," she said. "Anyway, there were more after the war than before," Hutton added. The entire catastrophe was manufactured, said Hutton, as part of an arrangement between Hitler and "financiers" to move Jews out of Germany. Hitler "had this deal where he was supposed to make it rough on them so they would all get out and migrate to Israel because they needed people there to fight the Arabs," he said.

Gibson was further quoted as saying that the Second Vatican Council was "a Masonic plot backed by the Jews" and the September 11, 2001 attacks were perpetrated by remote control: "Hutton flatly rejected that Al Qaeda hijackers had anything to do with the attacks. 'Anybody can put out a passenger list,' he said".

In the early 1990s, Gibson and Tom Costello hosted a video called Catholics, Where Has Our Church Gone?. It is critical of the changes made within the Catholic Church by the Second Vatican Council and espouses the Siri thesis that in 1958, after the death of Pope Pius XII, the man originally elected pope was not Angelo Roncalli, but another cardinal, "probably Cardinal Siri of Genoa" (a staunch conservative candidate and first papabile). Gibson stated that the white smoke that emanated from a chimney in the Sistine Chapel to announce a new pope's election was done in error; black smoke signifying that the papacy was still vacant was quickly created, and the public was not informed of the reason for the initial white smoke. A still photograph of a newspaper story about this event is shown. "Had our church gone up in smoke?" asked Gibson. He stated that the new pope was forced to resign under duress, and two days later, the "modernist Roncalli" was elected pope and took the name "John XXIII". In 1962, Roncalli, as Pope John XXIII convened the Second Vatican Council. In 2006, Hutton Gibson reversed his position on the Siri thesis, asserting that this theory was based on a mistranslation of an article written on October 27, 1958, by Silvio Negro for the evening edition of the Milan-based Corriere della Sera.

A similar event happened in 1939; a confusing mixture of white and black smoke emanated from the Sistine Chapel chimney. In a note to Vatican Radio, the secretary of the Papal conclave at the time, a monsignor named Santoro said that a new pope, Eugenio Pacelli, had been properly elected regardless of the color of the smoke. Pacelli took the name Pius XII.

Gibson endorsed Ron Paul for president in the 2008 United States Presidential Election. In January 2010, he made an appearance on the far-right-wing radio show, The Political Cesspool, to promote his views. In August 2010, he made another appearance on The Political Cesspool during which he made a widely discussed allegation that Pope Benedict XVI is "homosexual" and "half the people in the Vatican are queer". During the same interview, he also claimed that the Pope was a Freemason.

== Local congregation support ==
In 2006, Gibson's foundation, The World Faith Foundation of California, which is funded by Mel Gibson, purchased an existing church structure in the Pittsburgh suburb of Unity, Pennsylvania, and used it to establish a Tridentine sedevacantist congregation called St. Michael the Archangel Roman Catholic Chapel. Rev. Leonard Bealko, purportedly a former Roman Catholic priest who had left the church voluntarily in 1986, was appointed pastor. By mid-2007, Gibson and his fellow congregants had dismissed Bealko and dissolved the congregation amid charges that Bealko had misrepresented his credentials and mismanaged its finances.

== Later life and death ==
Gibson died at a medical center in Thousand Oaks, California, on May 11, 2020, at the age of 101.

== Books ==
- Gibson, Hutton (1978). Is the Pope Catholic?: Paul VI's Legacy: Catholicism?. Australian Alliance for Catholic Tradition. ISBN 9780731650149.
- Gibson, Hutton (1983). Time Out of Mind. Australian Alliance for Catholic Tradition. ASIN B0007C4E94.
- Gibson, Hutton (1994). The Enemy is Here!. Christian Book Club of America. ASIN B000AN33ZQ.
- Gibson, Hutton (2003). The Enemy is Still Here!. Faith & Freedom Publishing. ASIN B000AMYR2A.
