= Donal Gibson =

American actor (born 1958)

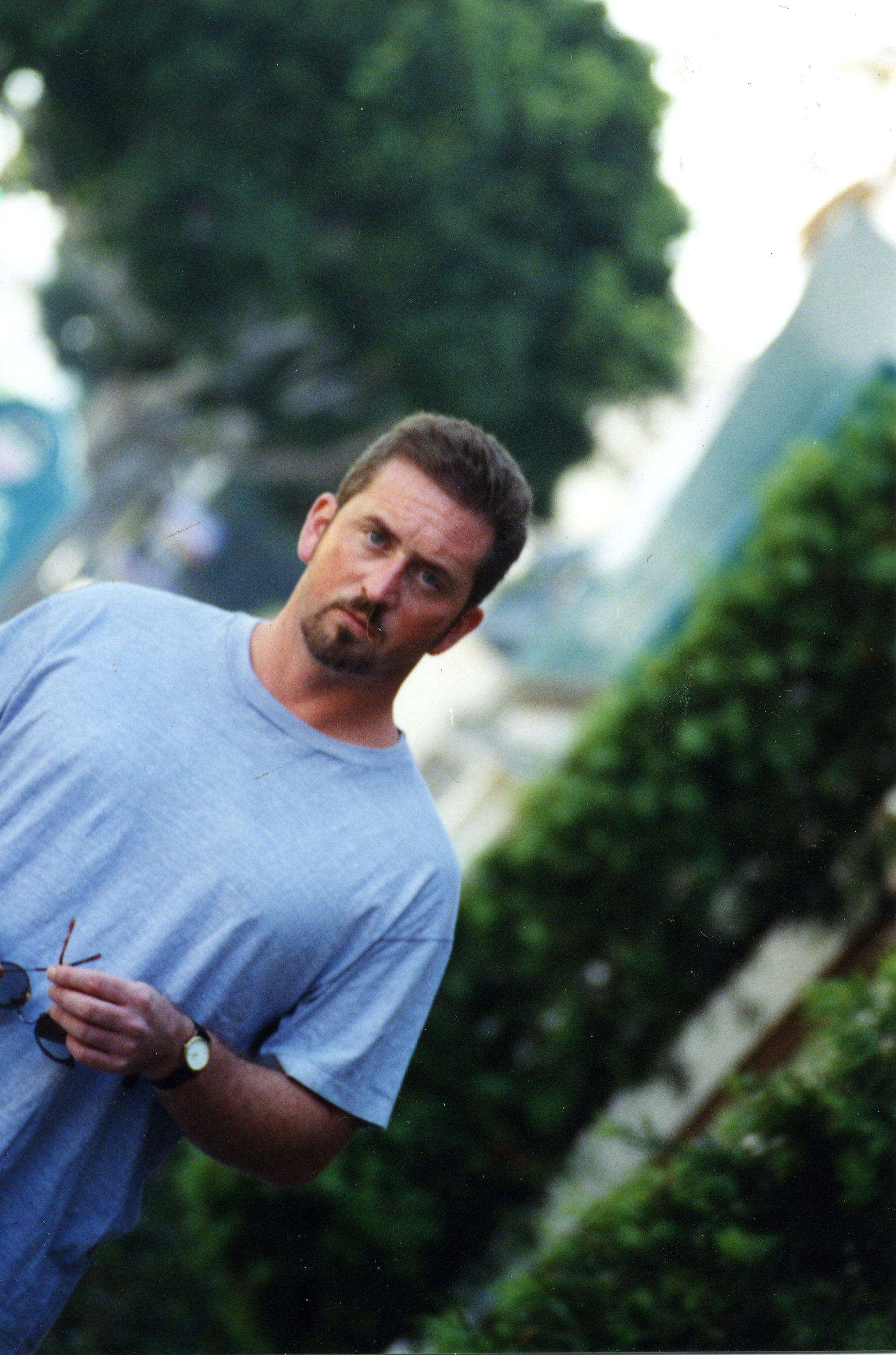
- Gibson in 1990s
- Born: February 13, 1958 (age 68)
- Occupation: Actor
- Years active: 1984–2006
- Spouse: S. Gibson
- Parent(s): Hutton Gibson; Anne Reilly
- Relatives: Mel Gibson (brother); Milo Gibson (nephew); Eva Mylott (grandmother)

Donal Gibson (born 1958) is an American actor and the younger brother of actor/director Mel Gibson.

== Early life ==
Gibson was born in Peekskill, New York, the son of Irish-born Anne Reilly Gibson and Hutton Gibson, whose mother came from Australia. The couple had 11 children. Gibson's father worked as a railroad brakeman until a work accident forced him to retire. He received a disability settlement, and in 1968 moved his family to Australia, when Gibson was ten years old.

In Australia he studied drama at the University of Newcastle and the Sydney Drama Studio. His professional debut was at the Nimrod Theatre Company in Sydney, playing Shorty in the play The Resistible Rise of Arturo Ui.

== Acting career ==
He has done voice acting in television series and films, including John Smith in Pocahontas II: Journey to a New World, a part that was voiced by his brother in the original Pocahontas film. Other voice roles are Captain Boomerang in Justice League Unlimited, Park Worker in The Wild Thornberrys, and Ray Tracer in ReBoot.

Gibson had roles in three of his brother's films. He played Riverboat Gambler in Maverick, Stewart in Braveheart, and Doctor in Conspiracy Theory.

Other film roles include Karl Holtz in Immortal Beloved, and Eric in Resistance.

== Filmography ==
=== Films ===
Year	Title	Role	Notes
1987	Emma's War	Hank	
1989	Casualties of War	Soldier #3	
1989	The Punisher	Bill	
1990	Blood Oath	Corporal Patterson	
1991	Fatal Bond	Rocky Borgetta	
1992	The Last Man Hanged	Warder	Television film
1992	Resistance	Eric	
1994	Maverick	Riverboat Poker Player	
1994	Immortal Beloved	Karl Holz	
1995	Braveheart	Stewart	
1997	One Eight Seven	Animal Regulation Officer	
1997	Conspiracy Theory	Doctor in Roosevelt Hospital	
1998	Pocahontas II: Journey to a New World	John Smith (voice)	Direct-to-video
2004	Paparazzi	Deputy Wilson	
2027	The Resurrection of the Christ: Part One	—N/a	Story writer
2028	The Resurrection of the Christ: Part Two	—N/a	Story writer

=== Television ===
Year	Title	Role	Notes
1984	The Cowra Breakout	Blackjack Devereaux	Miniseries
1997–1998	ReBoot	Ray Tracer (voice)	7 episodes
2001	The Wild Thornberrys	Park Worker (voice)	Episode: "New Territory"
2005–2006	Justice League Unlimited	Captain Boomerang (voice)	2 episodes
