= Eva Mylott =

Australian opera singer (1875–1920)

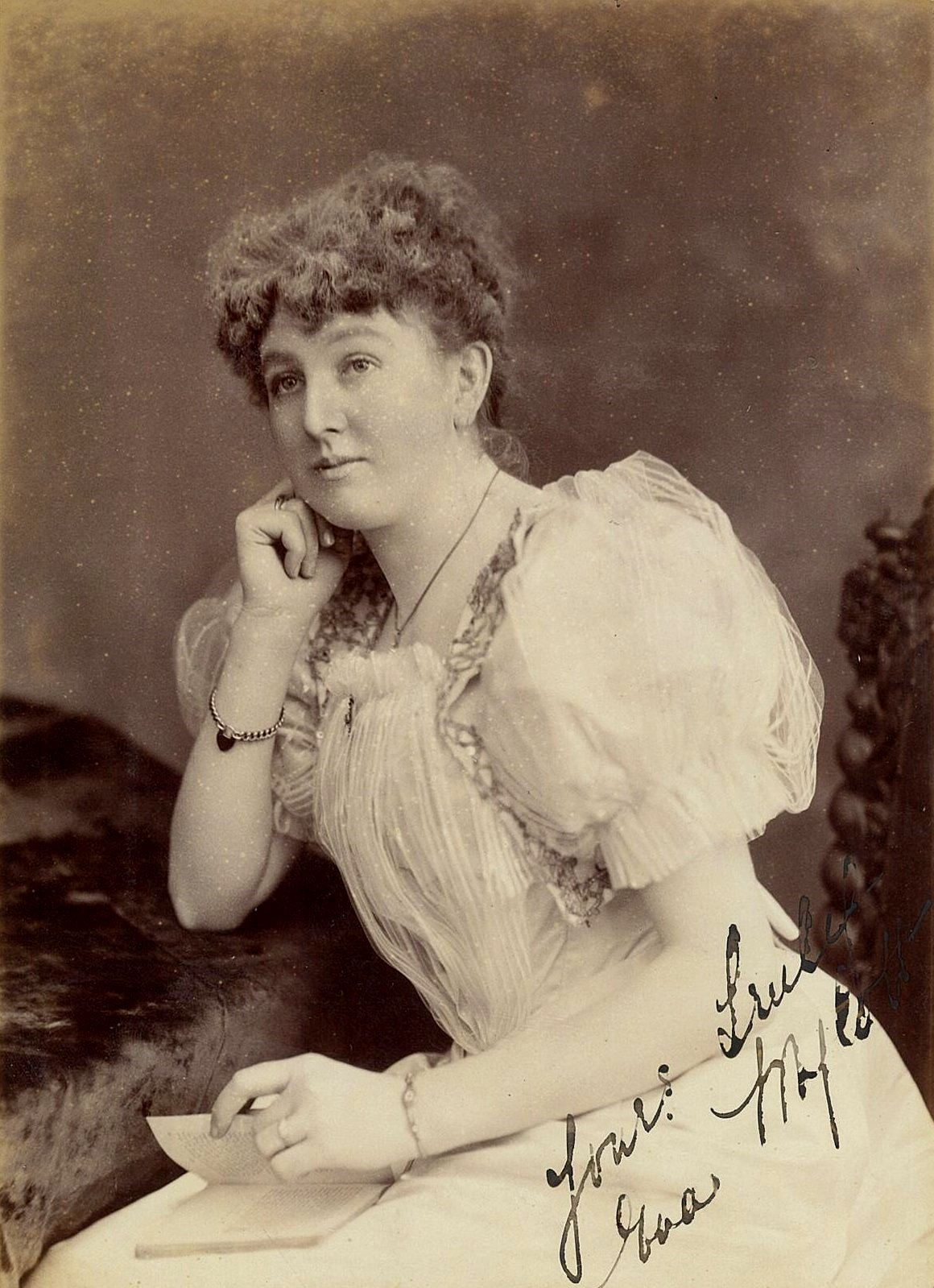
- Eva Mylott circa 1900

Background information
- Born: Eva Theresa Mylott; 16 September 1875; Tuross Head, New South Wales, Australia
- Died: 20 March 1920 (aged 45) Chicago, Illinois, U.S.
- Genre: Opera
- Occupation: Singer
- Spouse: John Hutton Gibson (m. 1917)
- Children: 2, including Hutton Gibson
- Relatives: Mel Gibson (grandson); Donal Gibson (grandson); Milo Gibson (great-grandson)

Eva Theresa Mylott (27 February 1875 – 20 March 1920) was an Australian contralto opera singer.

== Early life ==
Eva Mylott was born in Tuross Head, New South Wales. Her parents, Patrick Mylott (1838–1899), an importer of wine and spirits and Mary Heffernan (1839–1931) (the daughter of Edmund and Honora Heffernan), were Irish Roman Catholics who settled in the Colony of New South Wales. Patrick was born 1838 in County Mayo, the son of Patrick Mylott and Mary McDermott. He arrived in 1861 aboard the John Masterman. Mylott became a protégé of Dame Nellie Melba and in 1902, she went to England with her to pursue an opera career outside Australia.

== Personal life ==
On 17 June 1917 in New York City, she married American businessman John Hutton Gibson (died ca. 1933); they had two sons: Hutton Gibson in 1918 and Alexis Mylott Gibson. Mylott is the paternal grandmother of actor and film director Mel Gibson and his 10 siblings, including Donal Gibson. Through Mel, she is the great-grandmother of actor Milo Gibson.

Mylott died in 1920, aged 45, in Chicago, after some time from illness, leaving two-year-old Hutton and infant Alexis in the care of her husband, who died seventeen years later.
