= Breaking & Exiting =

- Film poster
- Directed by: Peter Facinelli
- Screenplay by: Jordan Hinson
- Produced by: Cecile Cubilo; Jordan Hinson
- Starring: Milo Gibson; Jordan Hinson
- Cinematography: Christopher Hamilton
- Edited by: Vaughn Bien III
- Music by: Sacha Chaban
- Production company: Kali Pictures
- Distributed by: Freestyle Releasing
- Release date: August 17, 2018
- Running time: 78 minutes
- Country: United States
- Language: English

Breaking & Exiting is a 2018 American romantic comedy-drama film written by Jordan Hinson, directed by Peter Facinelli and starring Milo Gibson and Jordan Hinson.

== Cast ==
- Milo Gibson as Harry
- Jordan Hinson as Daisy
- Adam Huber as Chris
- James Kyson as Peter
- Justine Wachsberger as Lana
- Lily Anne Harrison as Cynthia
- Cecile Cubilo as Anna
- Hermann Ludovick Pattein as Michael
- Blake Purdy as Melinda
- John Hinson as Officer Brinkman
- Colin Ferguson as Officer Davis
- Joaquim de Almeida as Hank

== Release ==
The film was released in limited theaters and on VOD on August 17, 2018.

== Reception ==
The film has a 0% rating on Rotten Tomatoes (just 6 reviews) Adam Graham of The Detroit News graded the film a D+. The Hollywood Reporter gave the film a negative review and wrote that "it's as unconvincing as big-screen romances get, which is saying something." Dennis Harvey of Variety gave the film a negative review and wrote "...very little happens in the way of narrative or character development, which leaves the film over-reliant on a central chemistry that isn't really there." Frank Ochieng of Screen Anarchy gave the film a negative review and wrote "Breaking & Exiting should be more than a movie-going misdemeanor in this felonious flop devoted to a pair of lop-sided lonely hearts in transition."
