= Tuross Head, New South Wales =

Tuross Head
- Town
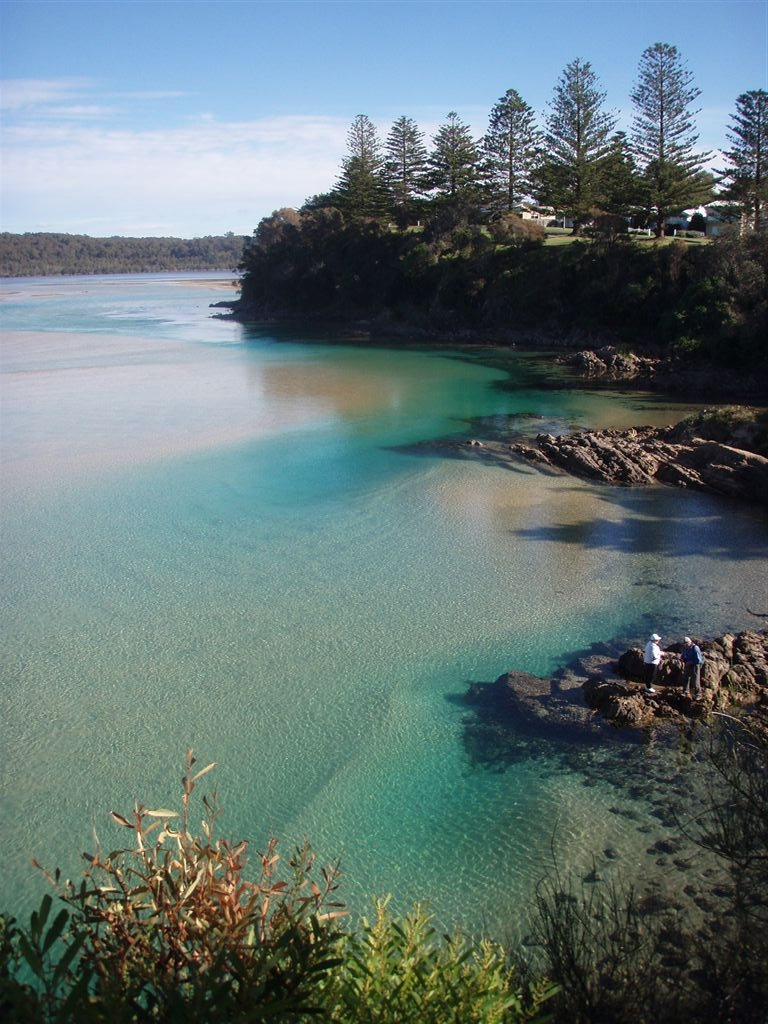
- Tuross River entrance

- Coordinates: 36°04′S 150°08′E
- Country: Australia
- State: New South Wales
- LGA: Eurobodalla Shire

Government
  - State electorate: Bega
  - Federal divisions: Eden-Monaro; Gilmore

Population
  - Total: 2,292 (UCL 2021)
- Postcode: 2537

Tuross Head is a seaside village on the south coast of New South Wales, Australia. It is situated approximately halfway between the townships of Moruya and Narooma, a few kilometres off the Princes Highway. As of the 2016 census, Tuross Head had a population of 2,241 people.

This quiet, seaside community is located on a headland that juts out into the Tasman Sea, connected to the mainland by a thin isthmus. Coila Lake is located to the north, with Tuross Lake and Tuross River to the south, effectively surrounding the headland with water.

The two lakes provide a safe environment for water-based activities; there is the opportunity for sailing on Coila Lake and for restricted water skiing in the Tuross Lake broadwater. Both bodies of water are easily accessible to explore via kayak or run-about with boat ramp facilities.

There are coastal walkways and a bike route that provides a link between both ends of the village. There is a diversity of local bushland to explore, from coastal dunes to three protected sections of littoral rainforest.

The village offers a range of accommodations, including bed-and-breakfasts, camping sites, a motel and a wide selection of holiday houses to suit most budgets. There is a local shopping centre, a golf course and a bowling club, along with a choice of cafés and restaurants.

== Demographics ==
The median age of people in Tuross Head was 59 years.

== Notable natives and residents ==
- Eva Mylott - opera singer and paternal grandmother of actor Mel Gibson
- Steve Starling - television presenter and celebrity angler/fisherman
