= Clawfoot (film) =

- Theatrical release poster
- Directed by: Michael Day
- Screenplay by: April Wolfe
- Produced by: Michael Day; Jordan Yale Levine; Jordan Beckerman
- Starring: Francesca Eastwood; Milo Gibson; Olivia Culpo; Néstor Carbonell; Oliver Cooper
- Cinematography: Nick Lentz
- Edited by: Kevin Kauffman
- Music by: Coen Wolters
- Production company: Yale Entertainment
- Distributed by: Vertical
- Release dates: October 14, 2023 (Newport Beach); July 19, 2024 (United States)
- Running time: 87 minutes
- Country: United States
- Language: English

Clawfoot is a 2023 American black comedy psychological thriller film written by April Wolfe, directed by Michael Day and starring Francesca Eastwood, Milo Gibson, Olivia Culpo, Néstor Carbonell and Oliver Cooper. It is Day's feature directorial debut.

== Cast ==
- Francesca Eastwood as Janet
- Milo Gibson as Leo
- Olivia Culpo as Tasha
- Néstor Carbonell as Evan
- Oliver Cooper as Samuel

== Production ==
In September 2022, it was announced that Eastwood and Gibson were cast in the film, which was then in production in Los Angeles. In October 2022, it was announced that Culpo, Carbonell and Cooper were cast in the film and that filming wrapped in Los Angeles.

== Release ==
The film premiered at the Newport Beach Film Festival on October 14, 2023 and was released in theaters on November 16, 2023. In June 2024, Vertical acquired U.S. distribution rights to the film, scheduling it for a theatrical release on July 19, 2024.
