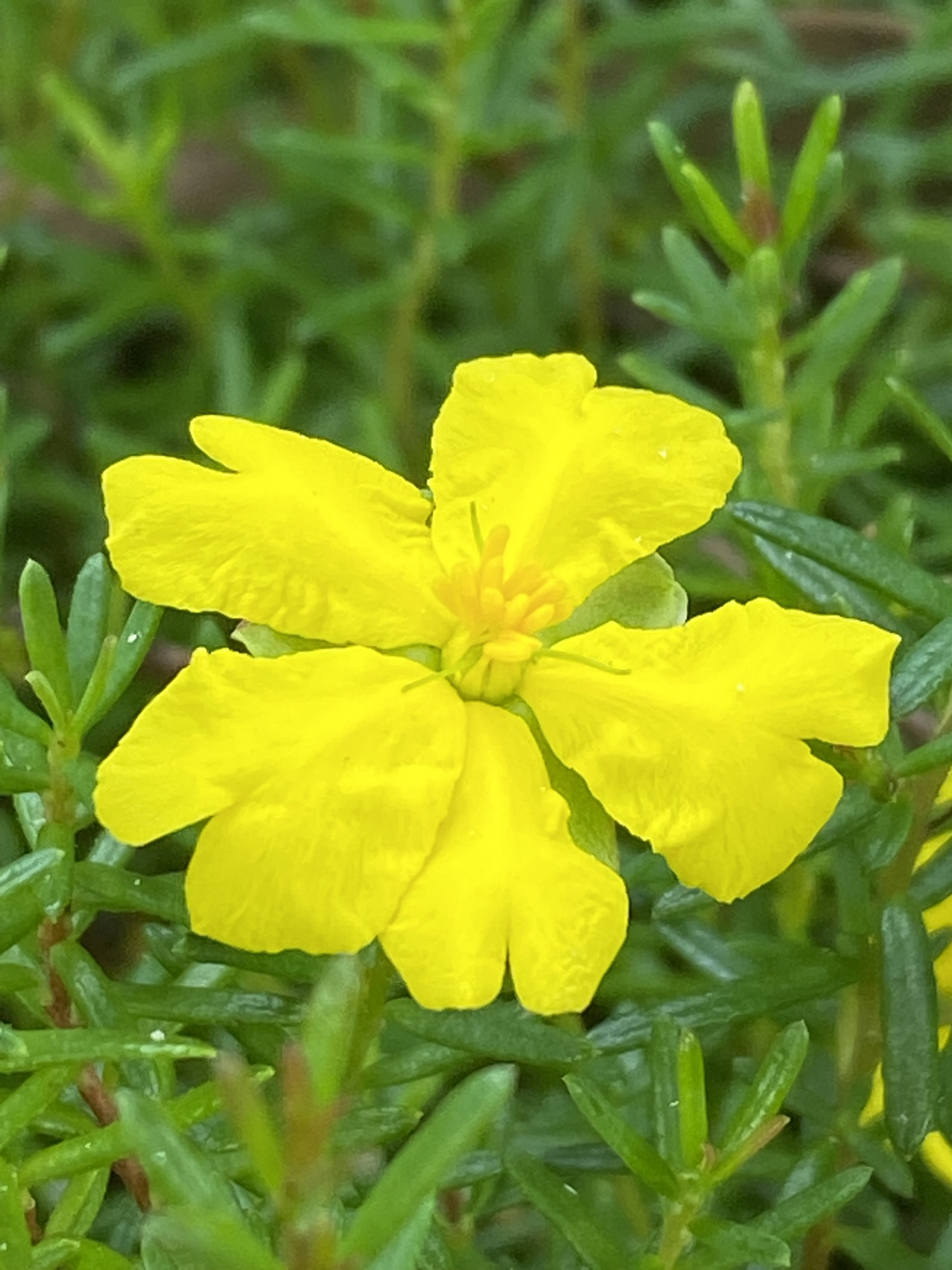

Scientific classification
- Kingdom: Plantae
- Clade: Tracheophytes
- Clade: Angiosperms
- Clade: Eudicots
- Order: Dilleniales
- Family: Dilleniaceae
- Genus: Hibbertia
- Species: H. pedunculata

Binomial name
- Hibbertia pedunculata R.Br. ex DC.

Synonyms
- Hibbertia corifolia Sims; Hibbertia pedunculata var. corifolia (Sims) Benth.; Hibbertia pedunculata R.Br. ex DC. var. pedunculata

= Hibbertia pedunculata =

Stalked guinea-flower

Species of flowering plant

Hibbertia pedunculata, commonly known as stalked guinea-flower, is a species of flowering plant in the family Dilleniaceae and is endemic to New South Wales. It is a diffuse, prostrate or erect shrub with linear leaves and yellow flowers borne on a relatively long peduncle, the flowers with fifteen to twenty stamens arranged around two hairy carpels.

== Description ==
Hibbertia pedunculata is a diffuse, prostrate or erect shrub that typically grows to a height of up to 20–60 cm (7.9–23.6 in) and has wiry, hairy young branches. The leaves are linear, 3–6 mm (0.12–0.24 in) long and 0.5 mm (0.020 in) wide and sessile. The leaves are hairy and the edges turn downwards. The flowers are arranged singly on a peduncle 5–15 mm (0.20–0.59 in) long. The five sepals are joined at the base, the two outer sepal lobes 1.8–2.6 mm (0.071–0.102 in) wide and the inner lobes 2.8–3.3 mm (0.11–0.13 in) wide. The five petals are egg-shaped with the narrower end towards the base, yellow, up to 10 mm (0.39 in) long and there are fifteen to twenty stamens arranged in groups around the three hairy carpels, each carpel with four ovules.

== Taxonomy ==
Hibbertia pedunculata was first formally described in 1817 by Augustin Pyramus de Candolle in his Regni Vegetabilis Systema Naturale from an unpublished description by Robert Brown. The specific epithet (pedunculata) means "pedunculate".

== Distribution and habitat ==
Stalked guinea-flower is widespread in eastern New South Wales where it grows in open forest. Records from Victoria are now referrable to other species.

== Use in horticulture ==
This hibbertia is frequently grown in gardens and is hardy in a range of situations. It is easily grown from cuttings or possibly by layering.
