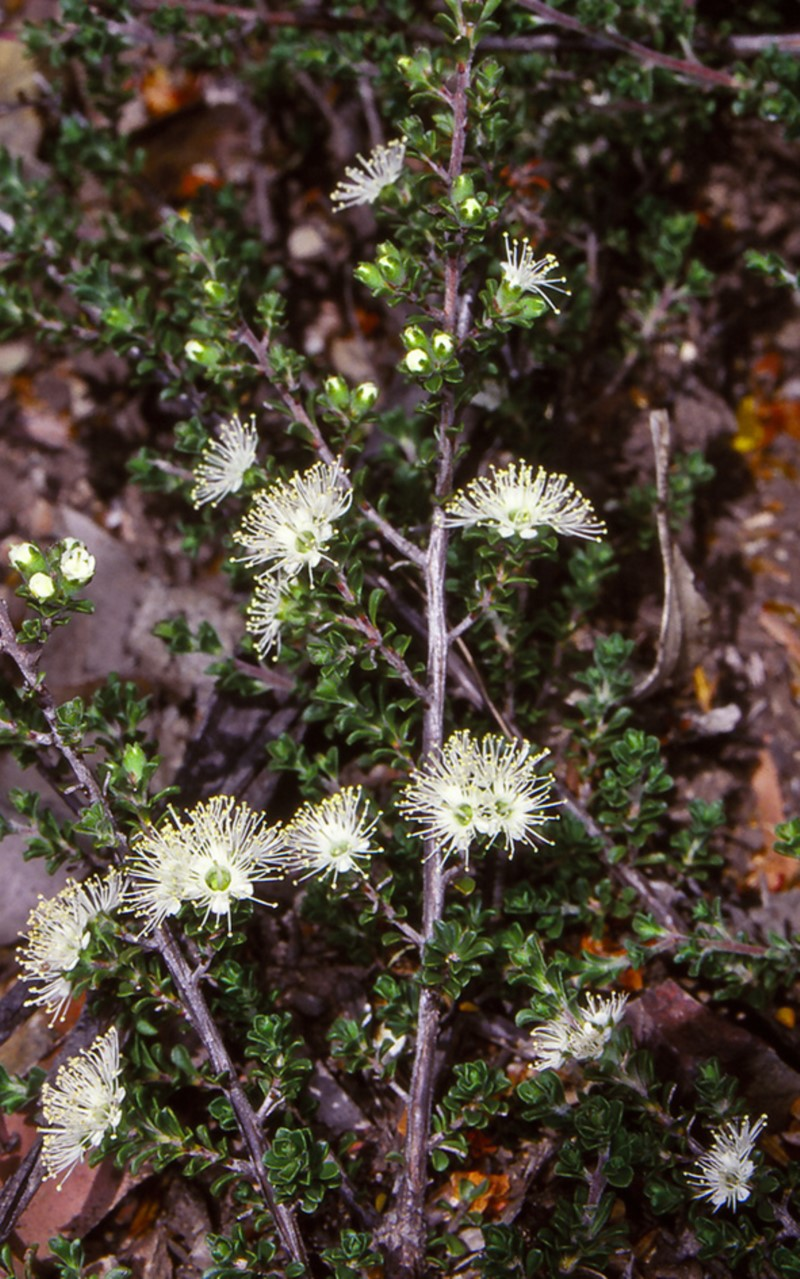
- Kunzea badjaensis growing near Snowball, New South Wales

Scientific classification
- Kingdom: Plantae
- Clade: Tracheophytes
- Clade: Angiosperms
- Clade: Eudicots
- Clade: Rosids
- Order: Myrtales
- Family: Myrtaceae
- Genus: Kunzea
- Species: K. badjaensis

Binomial name
- Kunzea badjaensis Toelken

= Kunzea badjaensis =

Species of shrub

Kunzea badjaensis is a flowering plant in the myrtle family, Myrtaceae and is endemic to a small area of New South Wales. It is a shrub with egg-shaped leaves and clusters of white flowers near the end of the branches. It grows at high altitudes on the Southern Tablelands.

== Description ==
Kunzea badjaensis is a shrub, often a prostrate shrub, which grows to a height of about 0.2–1 m (0.7–3 ft) with its branches hairy when young. The leaves are egg-shaped with the narrower end towards the base, 2–6 mm (0.08–0.2 in) long and 1–3 mm (0.04–0.1 in) wide with a petiole 0.5–1 mm (0.02–0.04 in) long. The flowers are arranged in rounded heads near the ends of the branches which often continue to grow during flowering. The sepal lobes are triangular, about 1 mm (0.04 in) long and the petals are white, 1.0–1.5 mm (0.04–0.06 in) long. There are about 30-40 stamens which are 3–4 mm (0.1–0.2 in) long. Flowering occurs between December and January and the fruit are cup-shaped capsules which are 4 mm (0.2 in) long and about 3 mm (0.1 in) wide.

== Taxonomy and naming ==
Kunzea badjaensis was first formally described in 2016 by Hellmut R. Toelken and the description was published in Journal of the Adelaide Botanic Garden. The specific epithet (badjaensis) is a reference to Big Badja Hill, one of the places where this species is found. It had previously been known as Kunzea sp. Wadbilliga (Rodd 6168).

== Distribution and habitat ==
This kunzea grows in heath on the tablelands at altitudes over 1,000 m (3,000 ft), mainly in the Kybean Range.

== Use in horticulture ==
Most individuals of K. badjaensis are low shrubs but a particularly low-growing form has been registered as a cultivar known as Kunzea 'Badja Carpet'. This horticultural form grows best in well-drained soil in a sunny position.
