= Big Badja Hill =

Mountain in New South Wales, Australia

- Big Badga Mountain
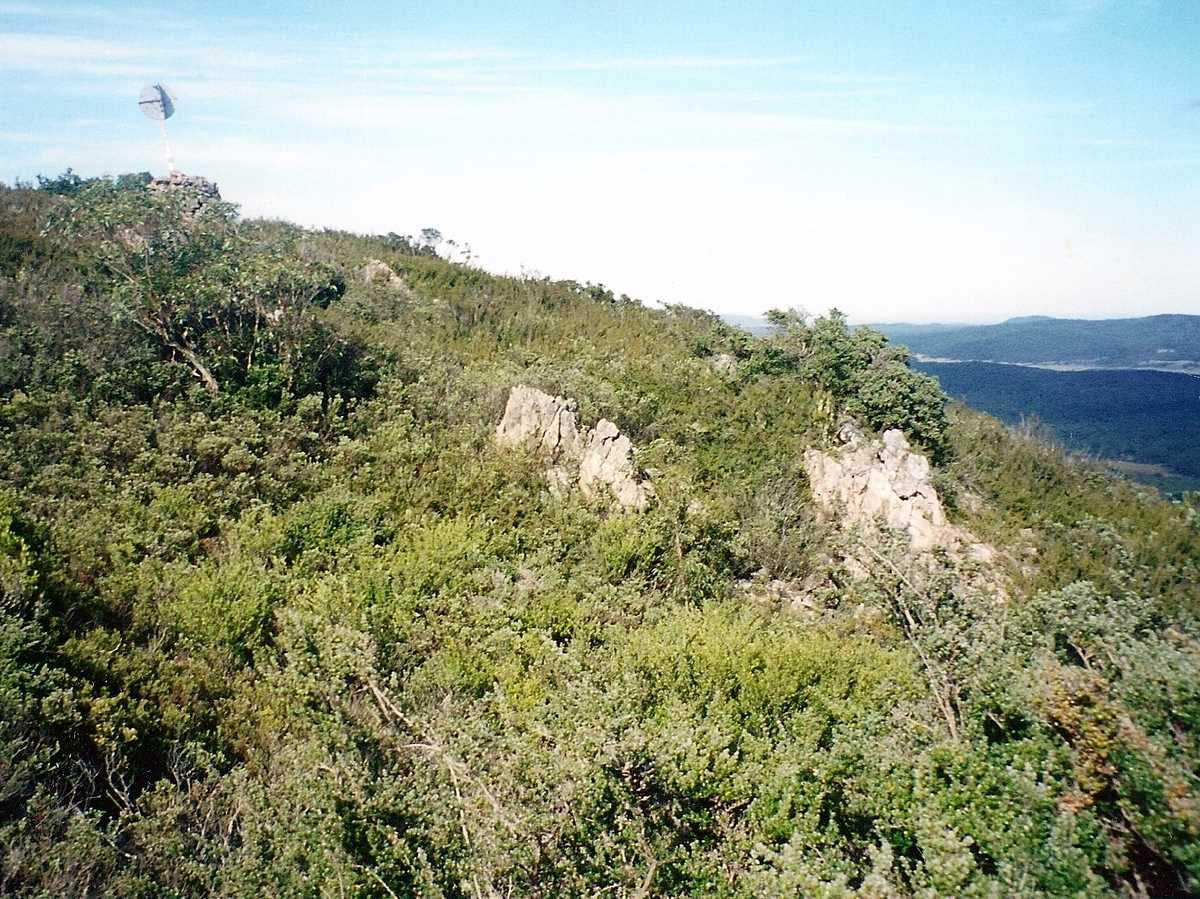
- Summit of Big Badja

Highest point
- Elevation: 1,363 m (4,472 ft)
- Coordinates: 36°00.29304′S 149°33.9524′E

Geography
- Location within New South Wales
- Location: Southern Tablelands, New South Wales, Australia
- Parent range: Great Dividing Range

Big Badja Hill, or Big Badga Mountain, a mountain on the Great Dividing Range, is located in the Southern Tablelands region of New South Wales, Australia, 47 kilometres (29 mi) north-east of Cooma. With an elevation of 1,363 metres (4,472 ft) above sea level, the mountain is situated on the western edge of Deua National Park.

Plants found nearby are the Big Badja gum and Kunzea badjaensis, a small myrtle with heads of white flowers on the ends of the branches.

== See also ==
- List of mountains in Australia § New South Wales
