= Tuross River =

River in New South Wales, Australia

Coordinates: 36°04′S 150°05′E

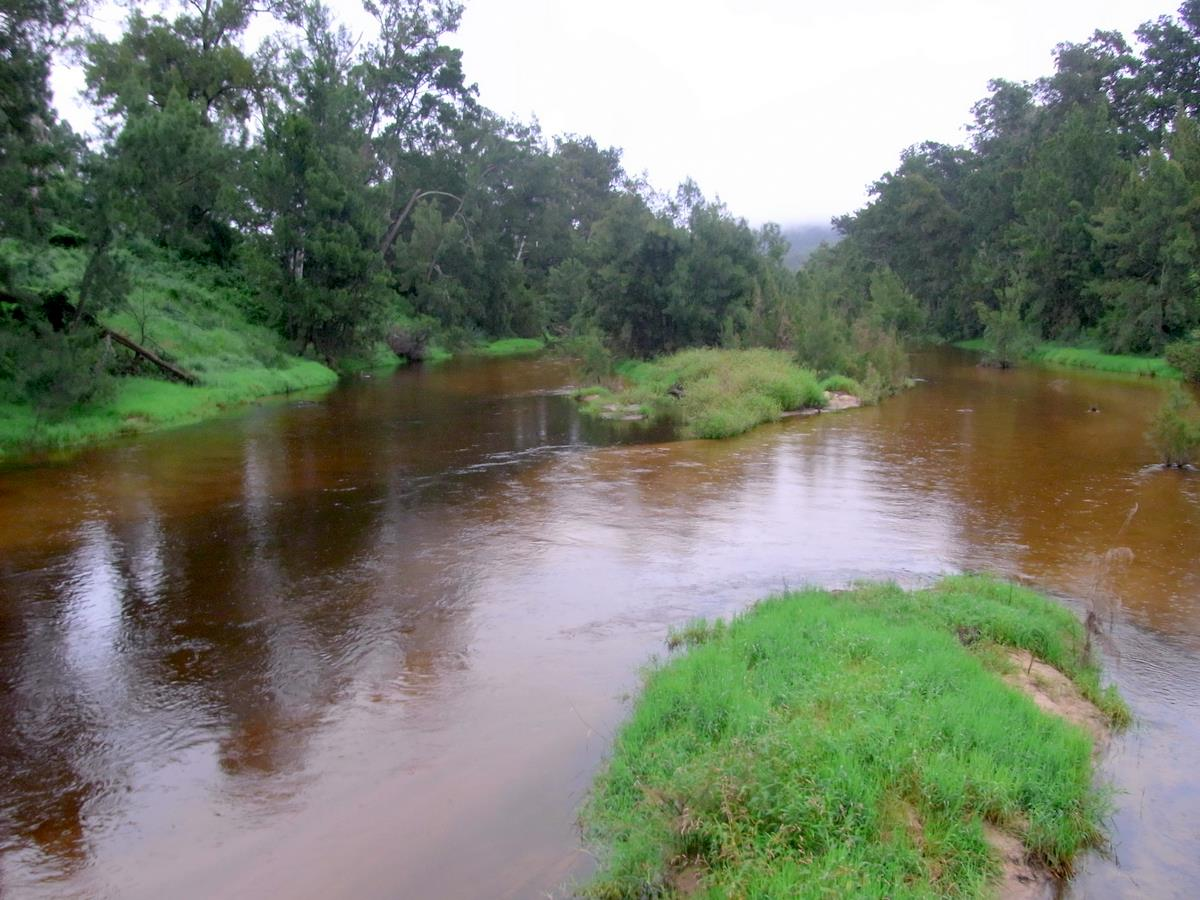

Location
- Country: Australia
- State: New South Wales
- Region: South East Corner (IBRA), South Coast
- Local government area: Eurobodalla
- Towns: Bodalla, Tuross Head

Physical characteristics
- Source: Kybeyan Range, Great Dividing Range
  - location: Mount Kydra, Wadbilliga National Park
  - elevation: 1,170 m (3,840 ft)
- Mouth: Tasman Sea, South Pacific Ocean
  - location: Tuross Lake, at Tuross Head
- Length: 147 km (91 mi)
- Basin size: 1,814 km^{2} (700 sq mi)
- Depth
  - average: 1.2 m (3 ft 11 in)

Basin features
- Tributaries
  - left: Guinea Creek, Swamp Creek (Tuross), Woila Creek, Mellion Creek, Big Belimbla Creek, Sawpit Creek, Swamp Creek (Comerang)
  - right: Back River (Cooma-Monaro), Bumberry Creek, Myrtle Creek (Eurobodalla), Wadbilliga Hole Creek, Wadbilliga River, Wandella Creek, Reedy Creek (Tuross)
- Waterfalls: Tuross Falls
- National park: Wadbilliga

The Tuross River, an open semi-mature wave dominated barrier estuary or perennial stream, is located in the South Coast region of New South Wales, Australia.

== Course and features ==
Tuross River rises of the eastern slopes of the Kybeyan Range, part of the Great Dividing Range, below Mount Kydra on the western edge of Wadbilliga National Park, not far from Cooma. The river flows generally north, east and northeast, joined by fourteen tributaries including the Back River and Wadbilliga rivers, before spilling into Tuross Lake and reaching its mouth at the Tasman Sea of the South Pacific Ocean at Tuross Head. The river descends 1,170 metres (3,840 ft) over its 147 kilometres (91 mi) course.

The catchment area of the river is 1,814 square kilometres (700 sq mi) with a volume of 18,208 megalitres (643.0×10^{6} cu ft) over a surface area of 15.5 square kilometres (6.0 sq mi), at an average depth of 1.2 metres (3 ft 11 in).

North of the town of Bodalla, the Princes Highway crosses the Tuross River.

== Gallery ==
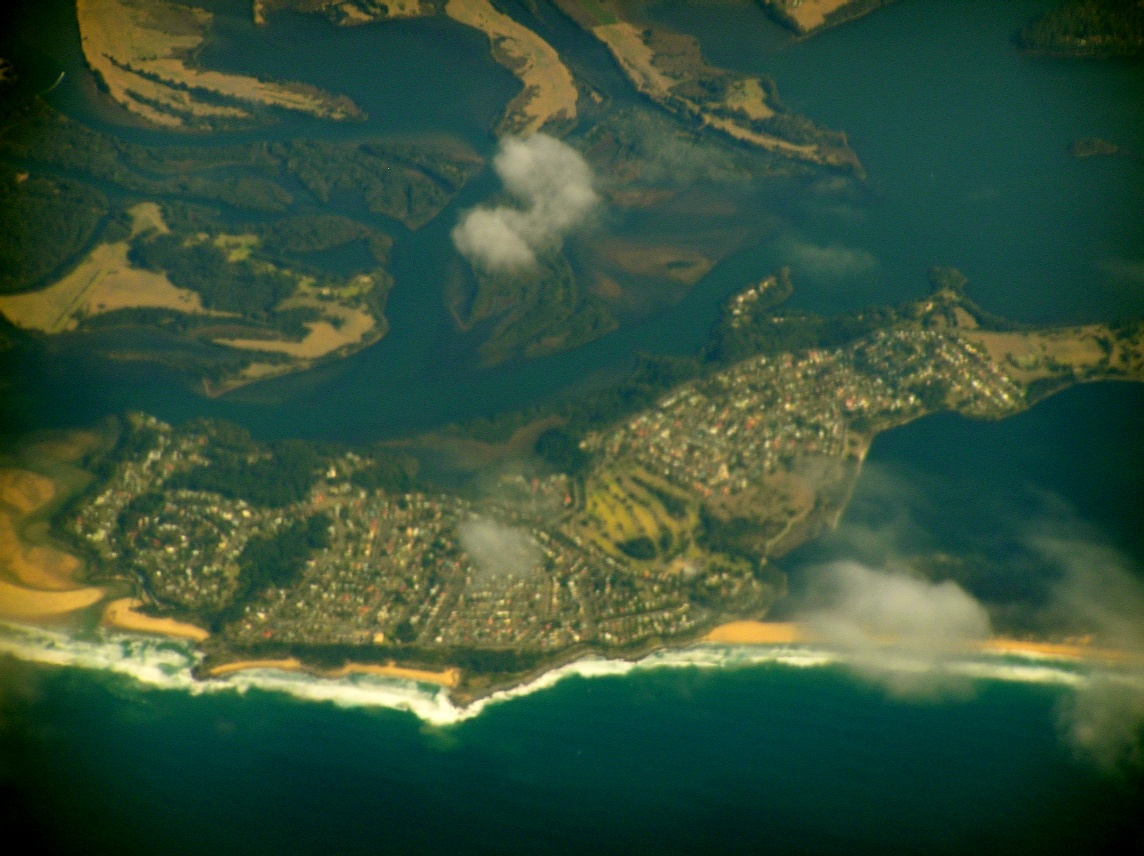
An aerial view of Tuross Head, with Tuross Lake to the right, and the estuarine Tuross River to the left, 2008.

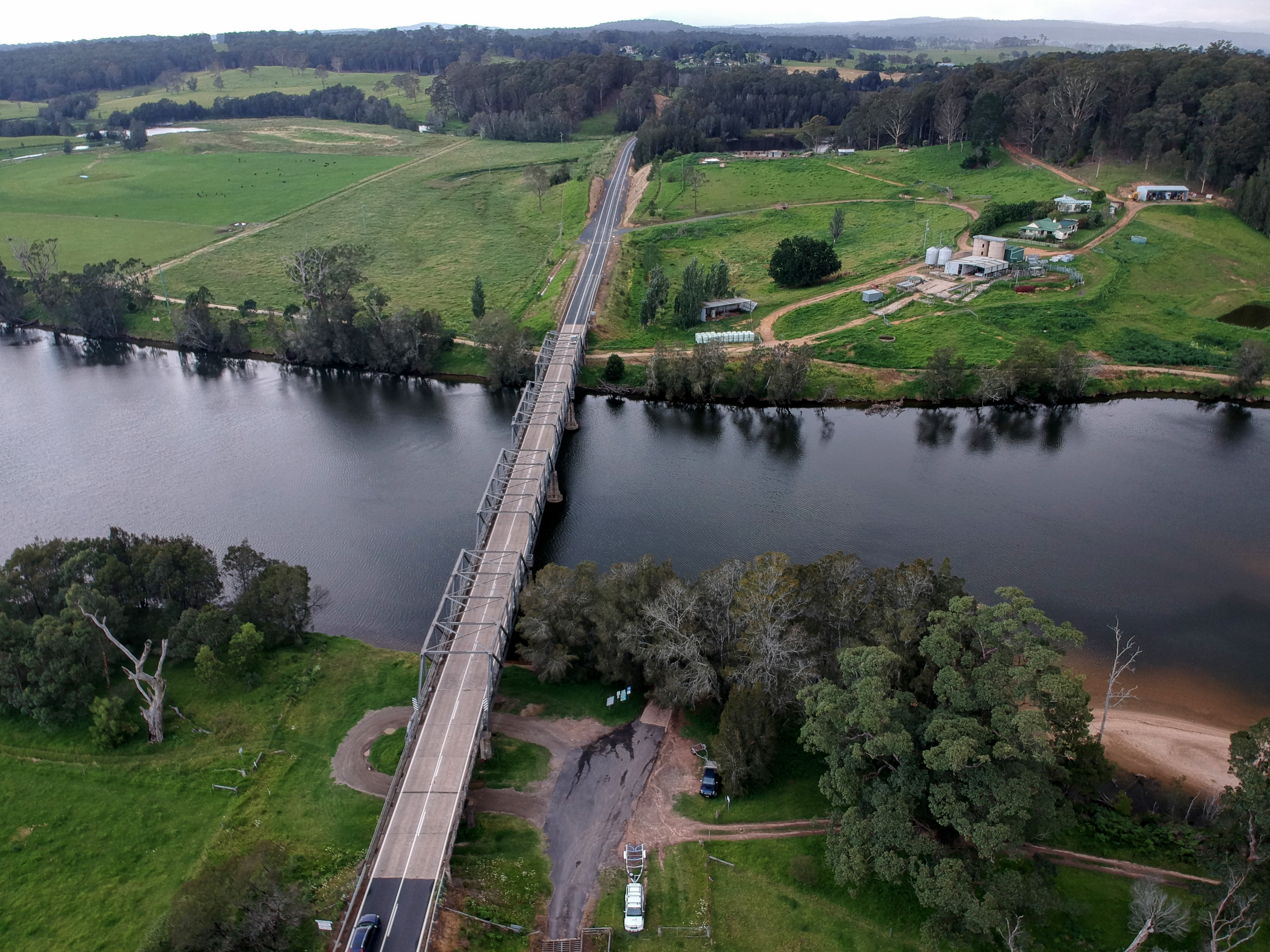
Princess Highway, bridge across Tuross river.

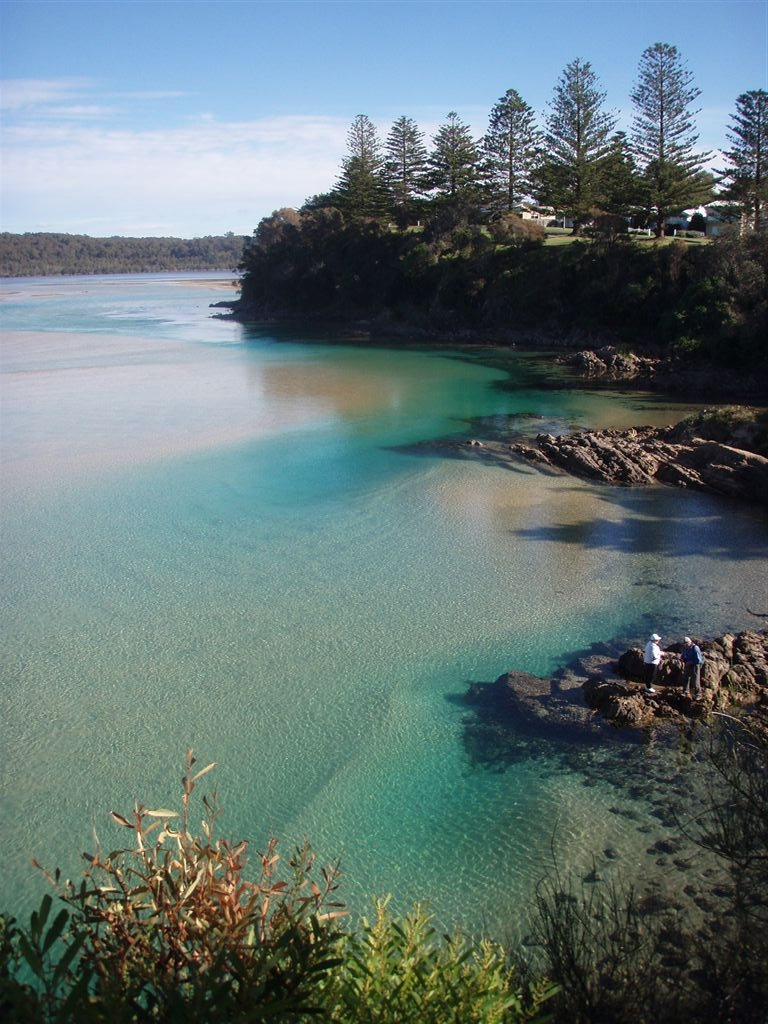
Tuross River mouth, at Tuross Head, 2008.

== See also ==
- Rivers of New South Wales
- List of rivers of New South Wales (L–Z)
- List of rivers of Australia
- Mordacia praecox
