= Wadbilliga National Park =

National park in Australia

- IUCN category Ib (wilderness area)
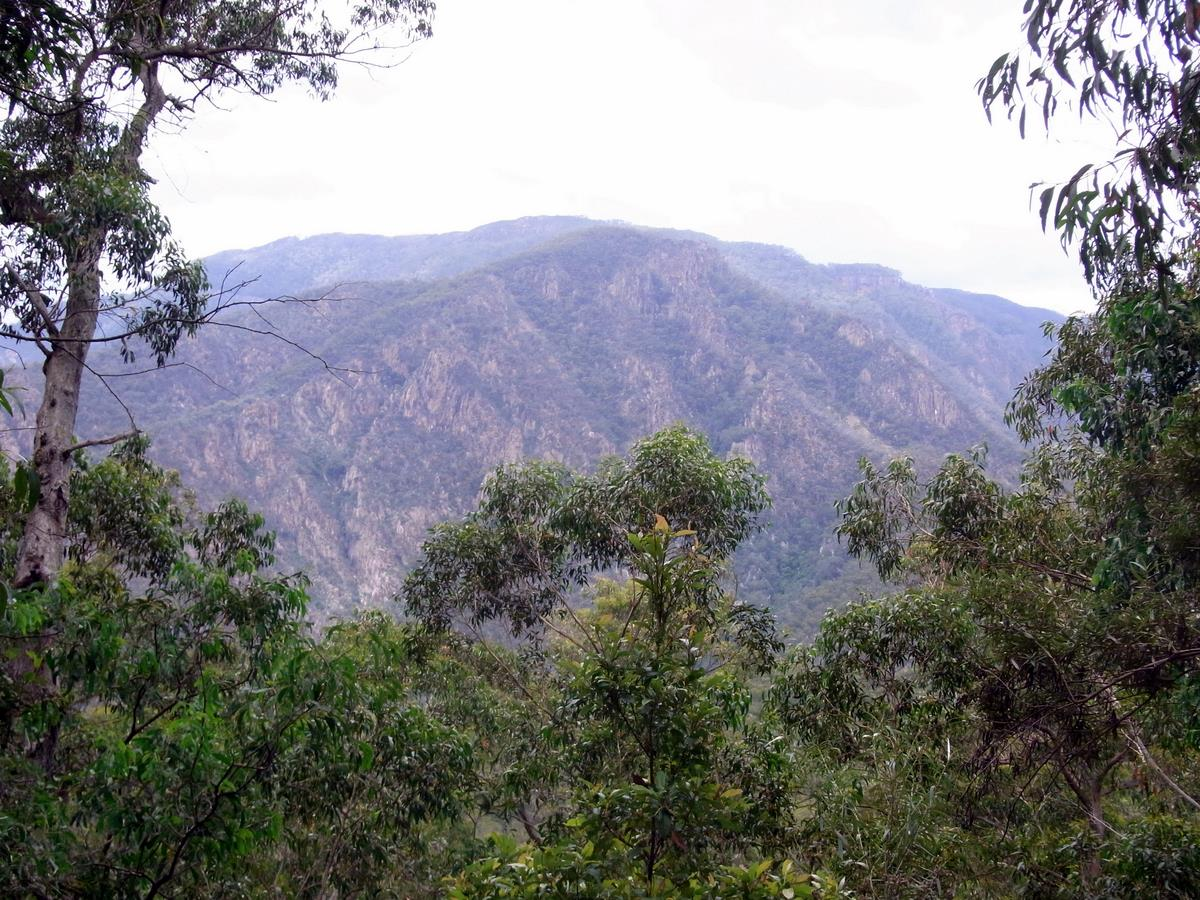

- Location within New South Wales
- Location: New South Wales
- Nearest city: Cobargo
- Coordinates: 36°28′S 149°35′E
- Area: 985.3 km^{2} (380.4 sq mi)
- Established: 30 March 1979
- Governing body: NSW National Parks & Wildlife Service
- Website: Official website

Wadbilliga National Park is a 985.3 km^{2} (380 sq mi) national park that is in high country spanning the Monaro and South Coast regions of south-eastern New South Wales, Australia.

== Location and features ==
Wadbilliga National Park is located 425 kilometres (264 mi) southwest of Sydney via Cobargo, and 150 kilometres (93 mi) south east of Canberra. The nearest towns are Narooma and Cobargo in the east, and Cooma on the plateau in the west.

Wadbilliga is a wilderness area, and much of its protected area is in a near pristine state. Featuring rugged gorges and gullies, it is suited to overnight camping and wilderness walking (only for the most experienced and well prepared). Areas of interest include the Tuross Falls, the Tuross River Gorge and Brogo Wilderness Area. The Wadbilliga Track is a scenic four wheel drive road which travels up the escarpment from east to west.

Wadbilliga is in a remote part of Australia, and has had little influence from mankind in the history of European settlement. In recent decades, it has become protected, and has intentionally been left in a natural state.

The average summer temperature is between 8 °C and 23 °C, and the winter temperature is -3 °C and 10 °C. The minimum elevation of the terrain is 15 m, and the maximum elevation is 1335 m.

=== Flora ===
The undulating plateaux and steep gullies provide a variety of different habitats. Pinkwood rainforests occur in the sheltered fire free gullies. black ash, monkey gum, messmate, white ash and snow gums occur at higher altitudes. yellow box, manna gum and forest red gum forests are found at lower altitudes. Other habitats include bogs, dry exposed eucalyptus woodland, riverside forest, swamps and heaths. Rare plants occurring in Wadbilliga National Park include the deua gum and the small shrub, Kunzea badjaensis.

=== Fauna ===
The bird and animal life is relatively undisturbed in this area. Over 122 native species of birds have been recorded here. Common animals include wombats, kangaroos, wallabies, possums of various types, platypus and echidna.

The park contains one of the largest populations of the greater glider in Australia. Vulnerable species such as the spotted-tailed quoll inhabit the park, as do powerful, masked, and sooty owls.

== Gallery ==
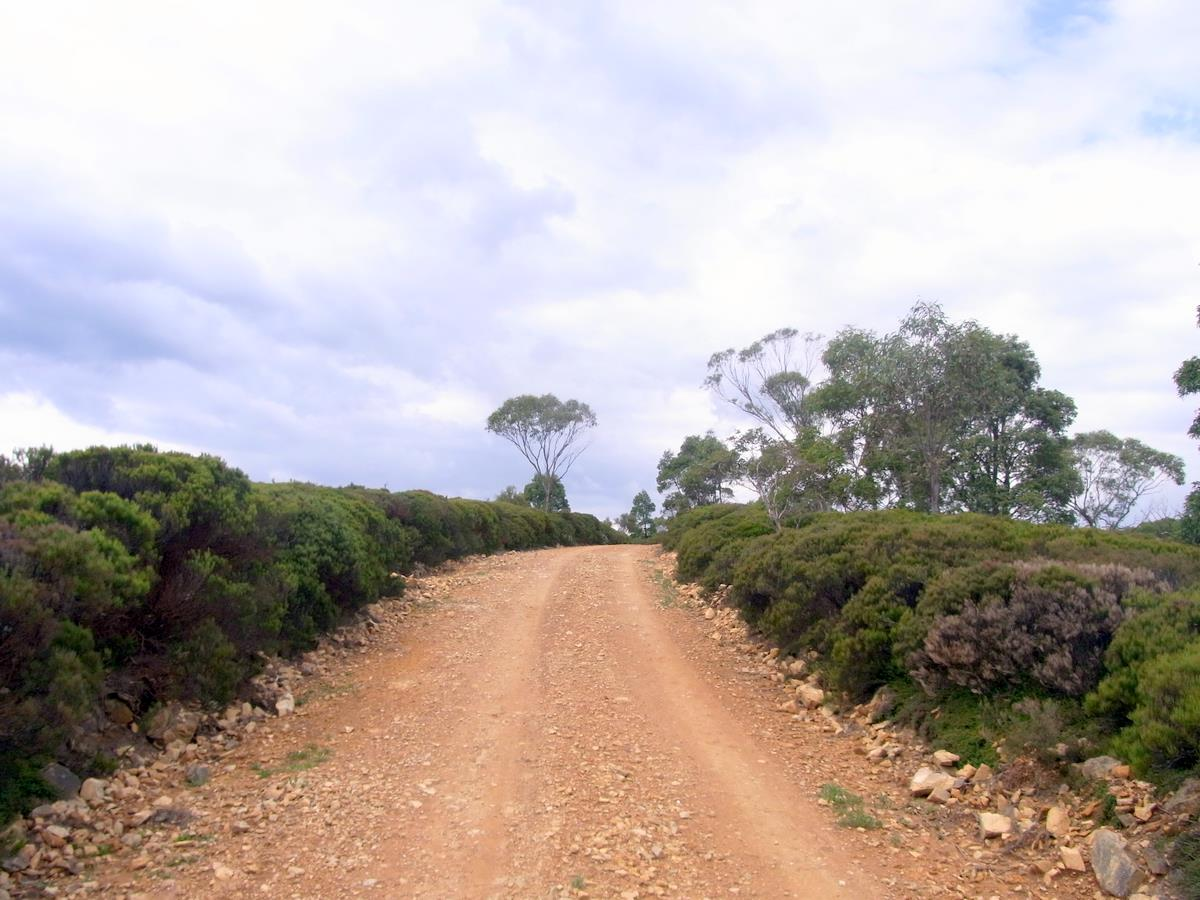
Wadbilliga Track & Heathland

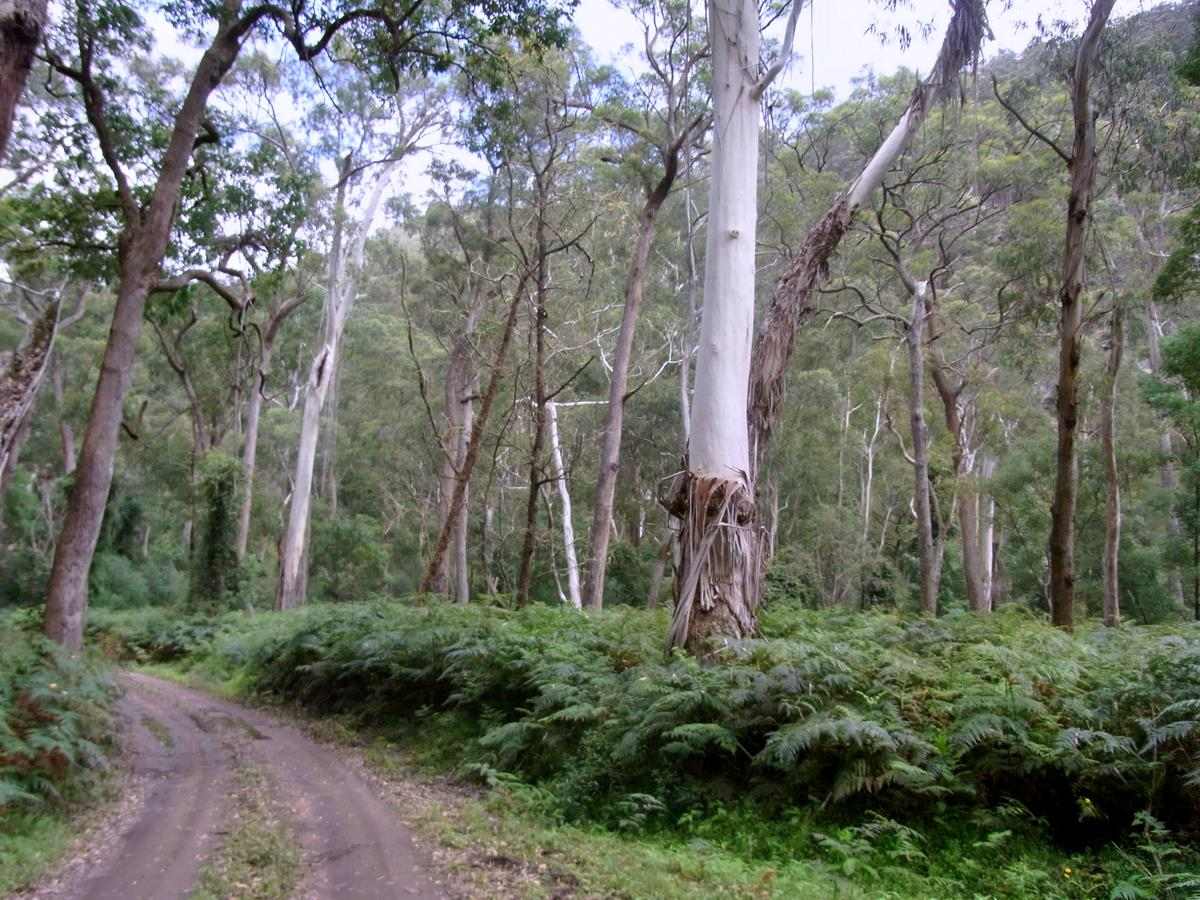
Wadbilliga Track and the manna gum

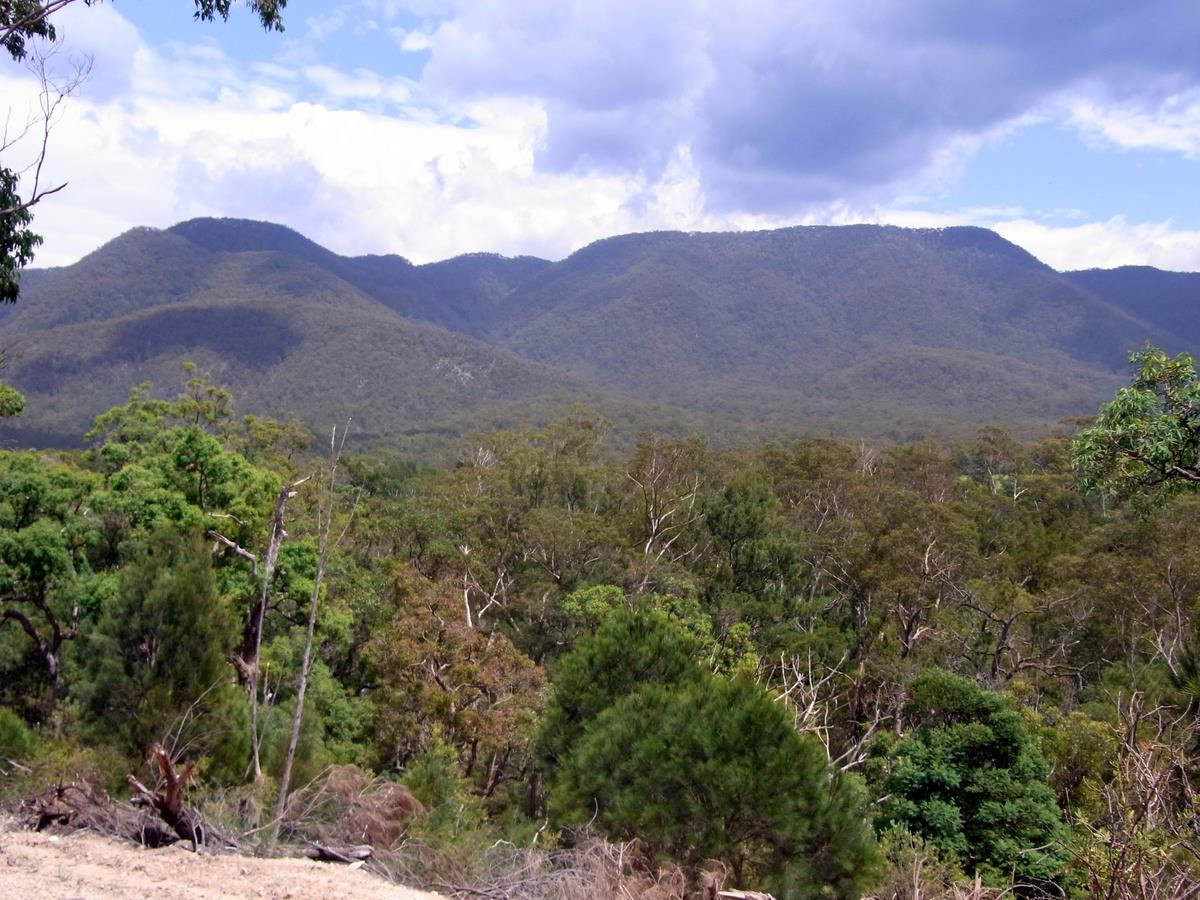
Wadbilliga National Park

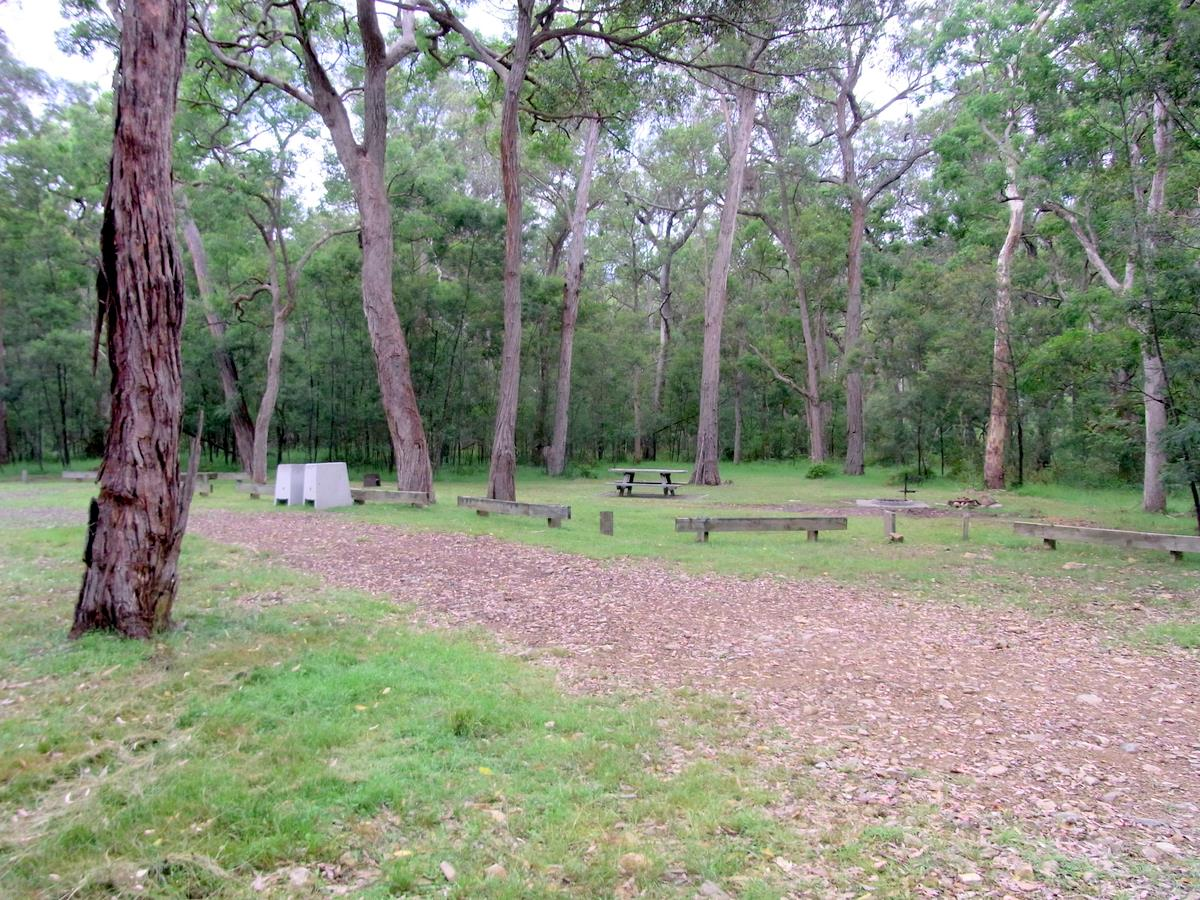
Campground at Wadbilliga National Park

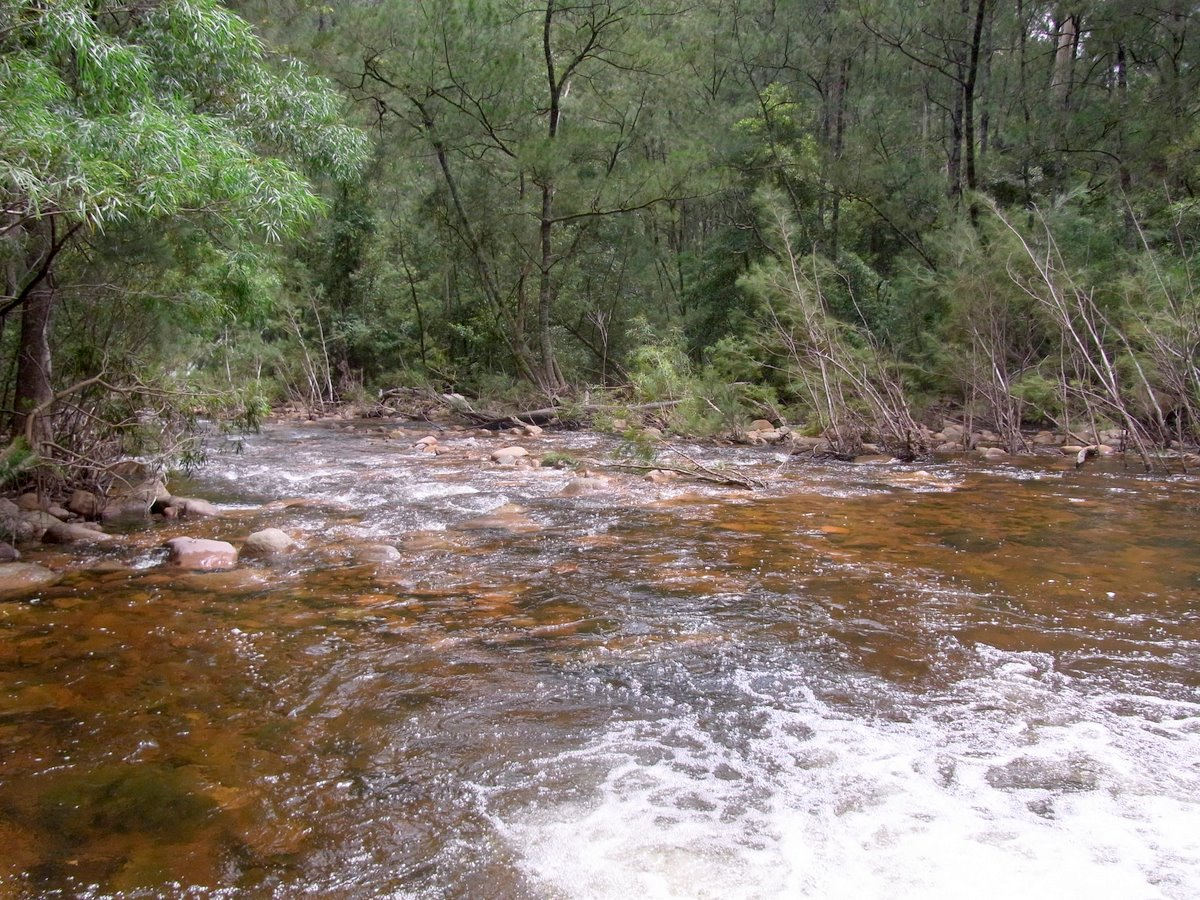
Wadbilliga River

== See also ==
- Protected areas of New South Wales (Australia)
- Bemboka River
