= Conscientious objection in the United States =

Conscription exemption

Conscientious objection in the United States is based on the Military Selective Service Act, which delegates its implementation to the Selective Service System. Conscientious objection is also recognized by the Department of Defense.

The Department of Defense defines conscientious objection as a "firm, fixed, and sincere objection to participation in war in any form or the bearing of arms, by reason of religious training and/or belief". It defines "religious training and/or belief" as:

Belief in an external power or "being" or deeply held moral or ethical belief, to which all else is subordinate or upon which all else is ultimately dependent, and which has the power or force to affect moral well-being. The external power or "being" need not be one that has found expression in either religious or societal traditions. However, it should sincerely occupy a place of equal or greater value in the life of its possessor. Deeply held moral or ethical beliefs should be valued with the strength and devotion of traditional religious conviction. The term "religious training and/or belief" may include solely moral or ethical beliefs even though the applicant may not characterize these beliefs as "religious" in the traditional sense, or may expressly characterize them as not religious. The term "religious training and/or belief" does not include a belief that rests solely upon considerations of policy, pragmatism, expediency, or political views.

— Department of Defense, Instruction 1300.06

Modern military and legal interpretations have expanded the understanding of "training" to encompass a broader spectrum of formative experiences beyond traditional religious schooling. This includes secular influences such as literature, cinema, and the profound moral realizations that can occur during active military service. This process, often referred to as "crystallization," acknowledges that a conscientious objection may not be a lifelong conviction, but rather an evolving ethical compass that matures through firsthand experience, eventually reaching a point where personal participation in armed conflict becomes a moral impossibility.

Conscientious objection must be "sincere and meaningful" and occupy "a place in the life of its possessor parallel to that filled by an orthodox belief in God". Any mixture of sincere religious, moral, or ethical beliefs can qualify as conscientious objection. The term "religious training and belief" does not include essentially political, sociological, or philosophical views, or a merely personal moral code. A conscientious objector may have political, sociological, and philosophical views, but such views are not a replacement for religious and/or moral beliefs.

A conscientious objector may still be willing to use force to defend themselves or others, and may even support a state's right to go to war, as long as the individual objects to personal participation in such armed conflict between states or groups.

This distinction is rooted in the conceptual difference between force and violence. While an objector may reject the organized violence of warfare, they might still subscribe to the use of non-violent force—such as physical intervention to prevent immediate harm to a third party. This nuanced position often intersects with the (Just War Theory) held by various religious and philosophical traditions. Under current U.S. legal standards, individuals who believe in the theoretical possibility of a just war must further demonstrate a conviction that no modern conflict can realistically satisfy those criteria. Consequently, to qualify for CO status, a claimant's objection must transcend specific political critiques and manifest as a total, sincere rejection of participation in war in any form.

== History ==
=== American Revolutionary War ===
During the American Revolutionary War, exemptions varied by state. Pennsylvania required conscientious objectors who would not join companies of voluntary soldiers, called Associations, to pay a fine roughly equal to the time they would have spent in military drill. Quakers who refused this extra tax had their property confiscated.

=== American Civil War ===
Conscription in the United States began in the Civil War. Although conscientious objection was not initially part of the draft law, individuals could provide a substitute or pay a commutation fee of $300 ($4,674.34 in 2017) to hire one. A July 4, 1864, amendment to the draft law ended commutation except for those draftees who were "conscientiously opposed to the bearing of arms." Conscientious objectors in Confederate States initially had few options. Responses included moving to northern states, hiding in the mountains, joining the army but refusing to use a weapon, or being imprisoned. Between late 1862 and 1864 a payment of $500 ($7,790.56 in 2017) into the public treasury exempted conscientious objectors from Confederate military duty.

We were cursed, beaten, kicked, and compelled to go through exercises to the extent that a few were unconscious for some minutes. They kept it up for the greater part of the afternoon, and then those who could possibly stand on their feet were compelled to take cold shower baths. One of the boys was scrubbed with a scrubbing brush using lye on him. They drew blood in several places.

— Mennonite from Camp Lee, Virginia, United States, 16 July 1918.

=== World War I ===
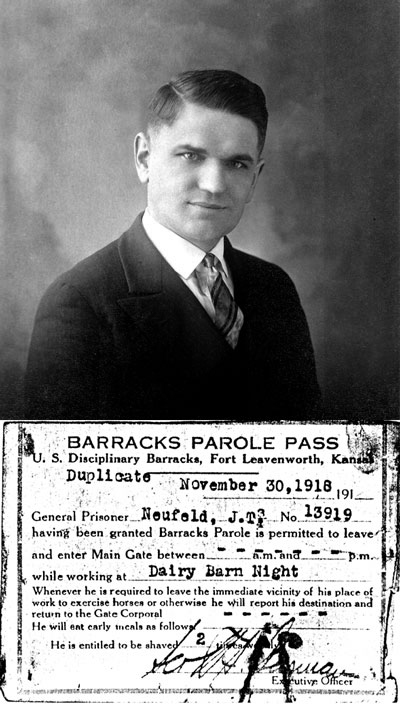
John T. Neufeld was a Mennonite World War I conscientious objector sentenced to 15 years of hard labor in the military prison at Leavenworth. He was paroled to do dairy work, and released after serving five months of his sentence. His diary of army and prison life has been published in a collection with three other WWI Mennonite conscientious objectors.

In the United States during World War I, conscientious objectors were permitted to serve in noncombatant military roles. About 2,000 absolute conscientious objectors refused to cooperate in any way with the military. These men were imprisoned in military facilities such as Fort Lewis (Washington), Alcatraz Island (California) and Fort Leavenworth (Kansas). Some were subjected to short rations, solitary confinement and physical abuse severe enough to cause the deaths of two Hutterite draftees.

Eventually, because of the shortage of farm labor, conscientious objectors were granted furloughs for farm service or relief work in France under the American Friends Service Committee. A limited number performed alternative service as firefighters in the Cascade Range near Camp Lewis, Washington, and in a Virginia psychiatric hospital.

=== World War II ===
During World War II, all registrants were sent a questionnaire covering basic facts about their identification, physical condition, history and also provided a checkoff to indicate opposition to military service because of religious training or belief. Men marking the latter option received a detailed form in which they had to explain the basis for their objection.

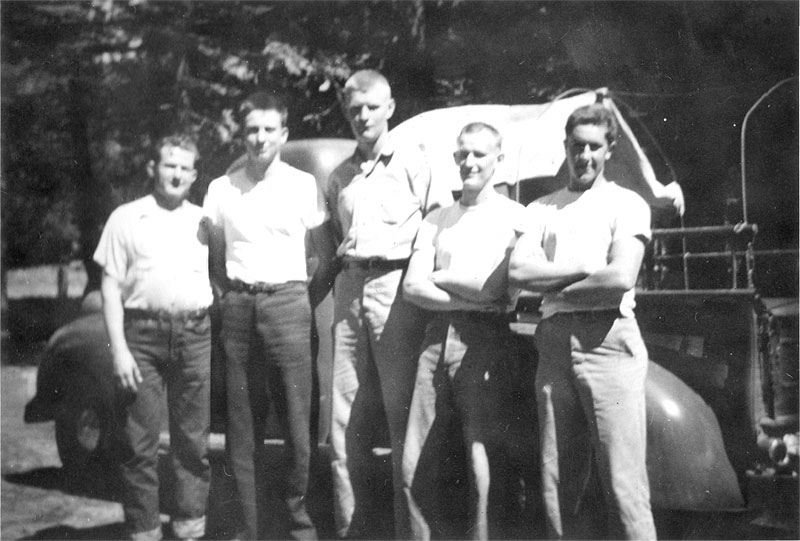
Civilian Public Service firefighting crew at Snowline Camp near Camino, California, 1945

Civilian Public Service (CPS) provided conscientious objectors in the United States an alternative to military service during World War II. From 1941 to 1947 nearly 12,000 draftees, unwilling to do any type of military service, performed work of national importance in 152 CPS camps throughout the United States and Puerto Rico.

Alternatives to war bonds and war savings stamps were provided for those who would not fund the war for conscientious reasons. The National Service Board for Religious Objectors offered civilian bonds and the Mennonite Central Committee offered Civilian Public Service stamps and War Sufferers' Relief stamps.

Civilian Public Service was disbanded in 1947. By the early 1950s a replacement program, 1-W service, was in place for conscientious objectors classified as 1-W by Selective Service. The new program eliminated the base camps of CPS and provided wages for the men.

1-W service was divided into several categories. The Earning Service involved working in institutions such as hospitals for fairly good wages. Voluntary Service was nonpaying work done in similar institutions, mostly within North America. Pax Service was a nonpaying alternative with assignments overseas. 1-W Mission Supporting Service was like the Earning Service but the wages were used for the support of mission, relief or service projects of the draftees choice. The nonpaying services were promoted by church agencies as a sacrifice to enhance the peace witness of conscientious objectors.

=== 1945 to 1950 ===
Paul French met with Paul Donovan in April 1945 to discuss the possibility of letting members of the CPS serve with the Office of Strategic Services (OSS) with the two reaching the conclusion they should be work in the research division and "studying the food needs of liberated areas and former enemy countries and the repatriation of displaced persons" but this proposal did not go through since conscientious objectors could only serve domestically.

Although conscientious objectors were prohibited from serving abroad many of them prepared for service overseas with proposals also being made for post-war service rebuilding some did come true. In January 1946 the Selective Service approved transferring 250 men from the CPS reserves into the United Nations Relief and Rehabilitation Administration and Brethern Service Committees becoming seagoing cowboys. Another 100 men were authorized to serve in March. Those who transferred over to become seagoing cowboys were paid $150 a trip, had to follow the same regulations as the CPS.

=== Cold War ===
==== Vietnam War ====
During the Vietnam War, about 170,000 men were classified as conscientious objectors and 300,000 were denied that status. In 1964, 18,000 conscientious objector deferments were given and during 1971 61,000 were given. Until the Vietnam War era, one needed to have religious convictions to become a conscientious objector. However, it needed to not be solely personal and if they served in a similar way to regular religious views. When someone gained conscientious objector status their draft classification would be changed from 1-A (eligible to be drafted) to 1-O or CO and finally to 1-W (assigned and working an approved alternative service). To be declared a conscientious objector one needed testimonials for others, fill out a form and answer a series of questions before then being granted conscientious objector status which they were informed afterwards.

When receiving their work detail they were not given any specifics. A work detail needed to be at least 200 miles (320 km) away from their permanent home and their compensation should not be more than the minimum wage. Most commonly this involved working at a hospital.

== Conscientious objectors with Medals of Honor ==
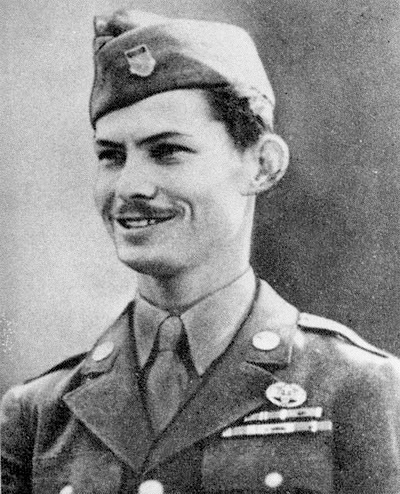
Desmond Doss, a Seventh-day Adventist, was the first of three conscientious objectors who agreed to serve in the US military in noncombatant roles and were subsequently awarded the Medal of Honor, the nation's highest military decoration.

Desmond T. Doss, a Virginia native and Seventh-day Adventist, desired to perform military service after the start of World War II. While enlisting with the intention of becoming a combat medic, Doss tried to claim noncombatant status but was told that the military did not recognize the designation. He was informed that he should register as a conscientious objector. Doss personally preferred to be called a "conscientious cooperator" because he would willingly serve his country, wear a uniform, salute the flag, and help with the war effort. Nevertheless, Doss accepted the designation "conscientious objector" in order to join the army and avoid a Section 8 discharge on account of his religious convictions.

On October 12, 1945, Desmond Doss received the Medal of Honor from President Harry S. Truman for saving the lives of 75 wounded soldiers despite heavy gunfire during the Battle of Okinawa. This medal is the highest award for valor in action against an enemy force. By helping to support and maintain the war, Desmond was the first non-combatant to receive the Medal of Honor. A dramatized account of Doss's life and war experience, as well as testimony from his peers, is portrayed in Mel Gibson's 2016 film Hacksaw Ridge, starring Andrew Garfield as Doss.

Other conscientious objectors who have been awarded the Medal of Honor are Thomas W. Bennett and Joseph G. LaPointe, both medics who served during the Vietnam War. Both Bennett and LaPointe were killed in combat within four months of each other in 1969 and were awarded their medals posthumously.

== Selective conscientious objection ==
"The individual's objections must be to all wars rather than a specific war." Objection to participation in a specific war is called selective conscientious objection, which the United States does not recognize. A conscientious objector may still be willing to participate "in a theocratic or spiritual war between the powers of good and evil".

United States v. Seeger, 1965, ruled that a person can claim conscientious objector status based on religious study and conviction that has a similar position in that person's life to the belief in God, without a concrete belief in God. United States v. Welsh, five years later, ruled that a conscientious objector need have no religious belief at all as long as they have the required beliefs stated previously.

== Conscientious objection in the Selective Service System ==
During a draft, the Selective Service System assigns classifications to draftees. A person classified as 1-A is considered available for military service. Conscientious objectors available for noncombatant military service are classified as 1-A-O, while those who oppose all military service are classified as 1-O and available for civilian work.

=== Alternative service ===
During a draft, as part of the Alternative Service Program, the Selective Service System will consider 1-O (civilian) conscientious objectors to be Alternative Service Workers (ASWs), required to work for members of the Alternative Service Employer Network (ASEN).

== Conscientious objection in the United States military ==
The Department of Defense also implements the classification of conscientious objectors into its own system. The Navy, the Marine Corps, the Army, the Air Force, and the Coast Guard each provide their own policies on conscientious objection.

=== Application within the military ===
When the draft is not in effect, only those who have enlisted themselves can apply for or receive formal conscientious objector status. Such a person is only eligible for classification as a conscientious objector only if their beliefs are determined to have "crystallized" after receipt of an induction notice. The Selective Service System does not accept requests for classification as a conscientious objector when the draft is not in effect. If the draft is reinstated, a draftee will have a short period of time after enlistment to request classification as a conscientious objector.

A person who is already enlisted can file for classification as a 1-A-O conscientious objector to be assigned to two years of noncombatant service or civilian work "contributing to the maintenance of the national health, safety, or interest".

=== Noncombatant service ===
Noncombatant service is any military service that is unarmed at all times and does not require weapons training. Service aboard an armed ship or aircraft or in a combat zone is considered to be noncombatant unless the service requires personal and direct involvement in the operation of weapons.

=== Investigative process ===
For serving personnel of the United States military, conscientious objection applications are "subject to an investigative process by a senior officer not in the applicant's chain of command", as well as "an interview of the applicant by a military chaplain as well as a psychiatrist or medical officer". The officer conducts an informal hearing at which the sincerity of the applicant's convictions is examined. By whom the decision is made varies by military branch.

=== Acceptance rates ===
Conscientious objector applications for enlisted soldiers are reviewed on a case-by-case basis by the individual's respective branch of the military. Between 2001 and 2007, Army acceptance rates for conscientious objector applications varied. Of the few applications the Army received (between 18 and 39 per year), between 49% and 78% were accepted per year.

While historical Army acceptance rates fluctuated in the early 2000s, more recent analysis provides a broader perspective on the challenges faced by applicants. Organizations such as the Center on Conscience & War (CCW) play a critical role in navigating the complex application process, which includes mandatory interviews with military chaplains and mental health professionals. While official Department of Defense data has indicated an approval rate of approximately 53% for CO applications, advocacy groups report that the success rate exceeds 90% for those who receive experienced counseling. These efforts and the ongoing struggle for recognition are commemorated annually on May 15, International Conscientious Objection Day. This observance serves to bridge the gap between the rigid hierarchical structure of the military and the individual's right to ethical dissent.

=== Absolutists ===
Absolutists are objectors, not recognized by law, who refuse to register for the draft altogether.

== See also ==
- Alternative civilian service
- Alternative Service Program
- Civilian Public Service
- Conscientious objector
- Conscription in the United States
- Selective Service System

=== Supreme Court cases ===
- Cox v. United States (1947), 332 U.S. 442 (U.S. 1947).
- Gardiner v. Tarr, 341 F. Supp. 422 (D.D.C. 1972).
- Gillette v. United States, 401 U.S. 437 (U.S. 1971).
- Parisi v. Davidson, 405 U.S. 34 (U.S. 1972).
- United States v. Seeger, 380 U.S. 163 (U.S. 1965).
- Welsh v. United States, 398 U.S. 333 (U.S. 1970).
- Witmer v. United States, 348 U.S. 375 (U.S. 1955).
