= Hacksaw Ridge =

2016 film by Mel Gibson

- Theatrical release poster
- Directed by: Mel Gibson
- Screenplay by: Robert Schenkkan; Andrew Knight
- Based on: The Conscientious Objector by Terry Benedict
- Produced by: Bill Mechanic; David Permut; Terry Benedict; Paul Currie; Bruce Davey; Brian Oliver; William D. Johnson
- Starring: Andrew Garfield; Sam Worthington; Luke Bracey; Teresa Palmer; Hugo Weaving; Rachel Griffiths; Vince Vaughn
- Cinematography: Simon Duggan
- Edited by: John Gilbert
- Music by: Rupert Gregson-Williams
- Production companies: Cross Creek Pictures; Demarest Films; Argent Pictures; Pandemonium Films; Permut Presentations; IM Global; Icon Productions; AI-Film; Windy Hill Pictures; Vendian Entertainment; Kilburn Media
- Distributed by: Summit Entertainment (through Lionsgate Films; United States); Icon Film Distribution (Australia)
- Release dates: September 4, 2016 (Venice); November 3, 2016 (Australia); November 4, 2016 (United States)
- Running time: 139 minutes
- Countries: United States; Australia
- Language: English
- Budget: $40 million
- Box office: $180.6 million

Hacksaw Ridge is a 2016 epic biographical war film directed by Mel Gibson, and starring Andrew Garfield as Desmond Doss, an American combat medic in World War II who, as a Seventh-day Adventist, refused to use a weapon of any kind; Doss became the first conscientious objector to be awarded the Medal of Honor, for his service during the Battle of Okinawa. The film was written by Andrew Knight and Robert Schenkkan, based on the 2004 documentary The Conscientious Objector. The supporting cast includes Sam Worthington, Luke Bracey, Teresa Palmer, Hugo Weaving, Rachel Griffiths, and Vince Vaughn. Filming took place in Australia from September to December 2015.

Following its premiere at the 73rd Venice International Film Festival on September 4, 2016, Hacksaw Ridge was released in the United States on November 4 by Summit Entertainment (through Lionsgate Films). It grossed over $180 million worldwide, and received critical acclaim, with Gibson's direction and Garfield's performance earning particular praise. It was widely viewed as a return to form for Gibson, whose career had been in decline following several controversies. Hacksaw Ridge was chosen by both the National Board of Review and American Film Institute as one of their top ten films of 2016, and received numerous awards and nominations. At the 89th Academy Awards, the film received six nominations, including Best Picture, winning for Best Sound Mixing and Best Film Editing. It also received three Golden Globe nominations and twelve nominations at the Australian Academy Awards, winning nine of them including Best Film.

== Plot ==
In 1929 Lynchburg, Virginia, young Desmond Doss nearly kills his brother while roughhousing. That event and his Seventh-day Adventist upbringing reinforce Desmond's belief in the commandment "Thou shalt not kill". Years later, he takes an injured man to the hospital and a romance develops with a nurse, Dorothy Schutte. Desmond tells her of his interest in medical work.

After the Japanese attack on Pearl Harbor brings the United States into World War II, Desmond enlists in the United States Army to serve as a combat medic. His father, Tom, a PTSD-ridden World War I veteran, is deeply upset by the decision. Shortly before leaving, Desmond and Dorothy get engaged.

Desmond is placed in basic training with the 77th Infantry Division under Sergeant Howell. He excels physically but becomes a pariah among his fellow soldiers for refusing to handle a rifle or train on Saturdays.

Howell and Captain Glover's attempts to discharge Desmond for psychiatric reasons under Section 8 are overruled, as Desmond's religious beliefs do not constitute mental illness. They subsequently try to drive him out with grueling labor tasks. After being beaten one night by his fellow soldiers, Doss refuses to identify his attackers, earning their respect.

Desmond's unit gets leave after basic training and Desmond intends to marry Dorothy, but his refusal to carry a firearm leads to an arrest for insubordination. Captain Glover and Dorothy visit Desmond in jail and try to convince him to plead guilty so that he can be released without charge, but he refuses to compromise his beliefs. He pleads not guilty at his court-martial but is found guilty. His father bursts into the tribunal before sentence can be pronounced with a letter from his former commanding officer, now a brigadier general, stating his son's pacifism is protected by the US Constitution and legal precedents. The charges are dropped, and Desmond and Dorothy are married.

Desmond’s unit is deployed to the Pacific Theater. During the Battle of Okinawa, they are tasked with ascending and securing the Maeda Escarpment ("Hacksaw Ridge"). The battle begins with heavy losses on both sides. Desmond saves the life of his squad-mate Smitty, who apologizes for doubting his courage. Desmond reveals that his aversion to holding a firearm stems from nearly shooting his drunken father, who threatened his mother with a gun. When a Japanese counterattack drives the Americans off the escarpment, Smitty is killed, and Howell and several of Desmond’s comrades are left injured on the battlefield.

Desmond hears the cries of dying soldiers and returns to save them, carrying the wounded to the cliff's edge and belaying them down by rope, each time praying to save one more. The rescue of dozens of wounded who had been presumed dead comes as a shock to the rest of the unit below. When day breaks, Desmond rescues Howell under heavy fire. Captain Glover apologizes for dismissing Desmond’s beliefs and states that they are scheduled to retake the ridge on Saturday but will not launch the next attack without him. Desmond agrees, but the operation is delayed until after he concludes his Sabbath prayers.

With reinforcements, they turn the tide of battle. In an ambush set by Japanese soldiers who pretend to surrender, Desmond saves Glover and others by deflecting enemy grenades. He is wounded by a grenade blast, but the battle is won. The Japanese commanding officers are shown committing seppuku as Desmond is lowered from the cliff, clutching the Bible that Dorothy had given to him.

The film closes with images of the real Desmond Doss being awarded the Medal of Honor by President Harry S. Truman for rescuing 75 soldiers at Hacksaw Ridge, and an interview with Desmond just before his death, recounting his experiences during the war.

== Cast ==
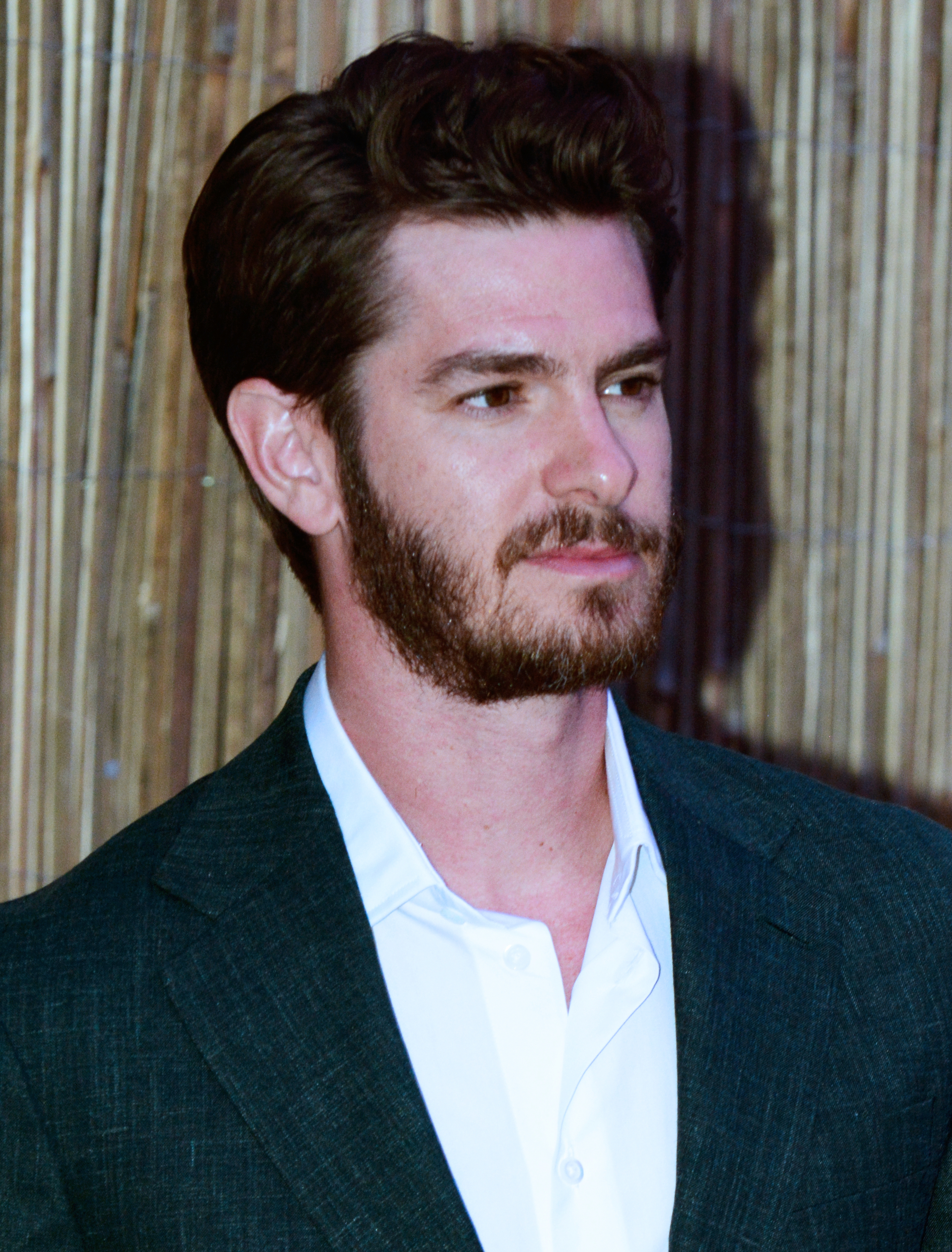
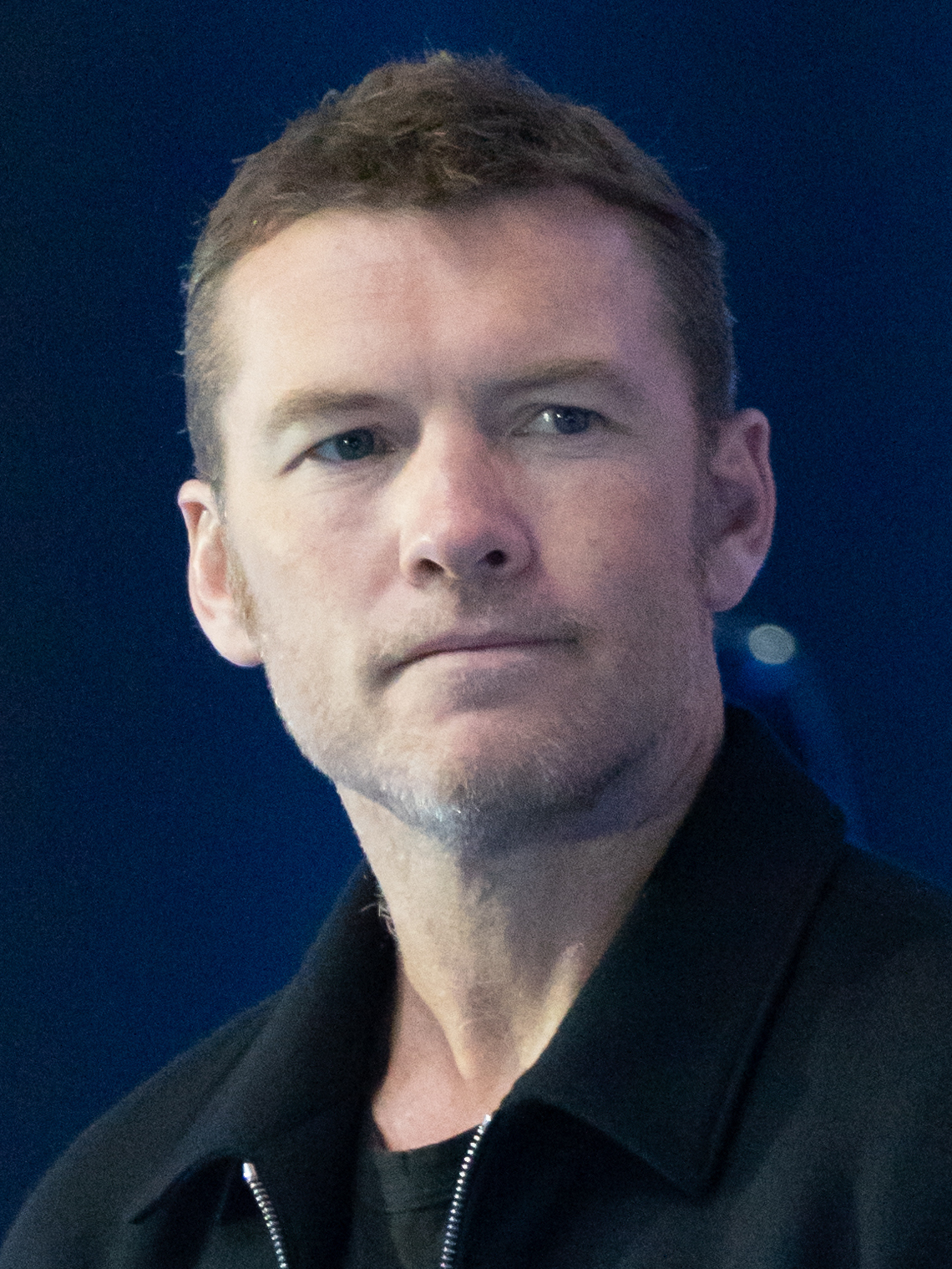
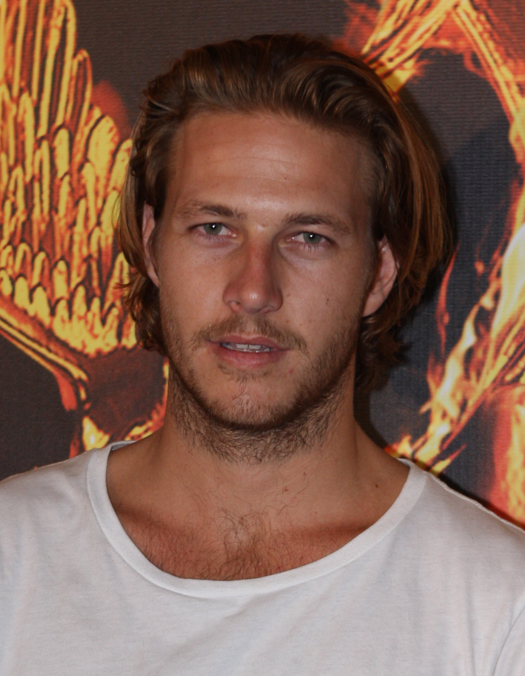
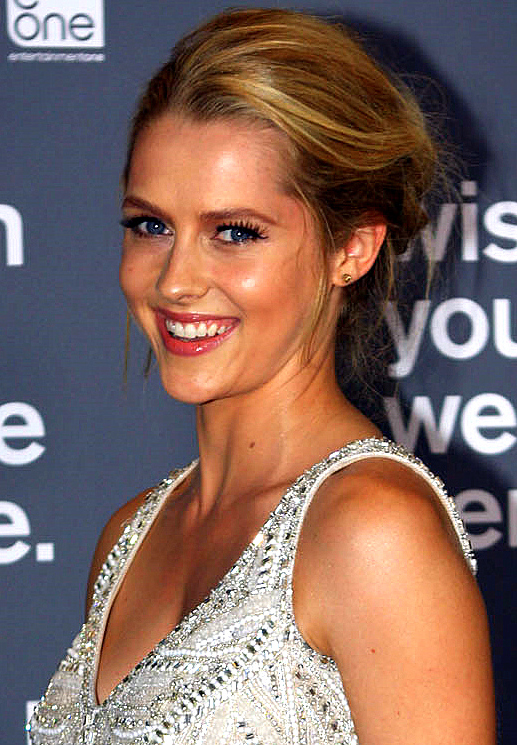
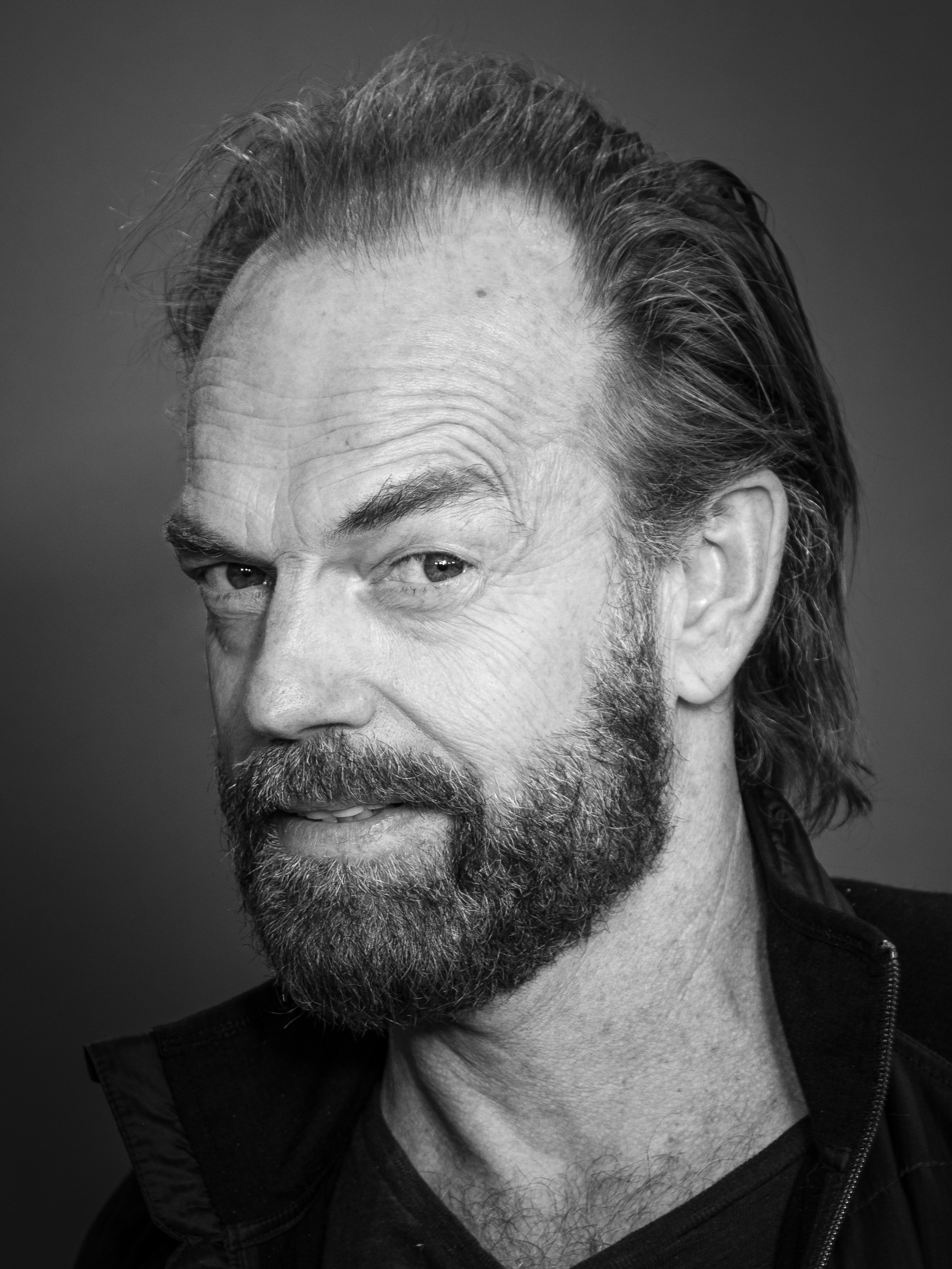
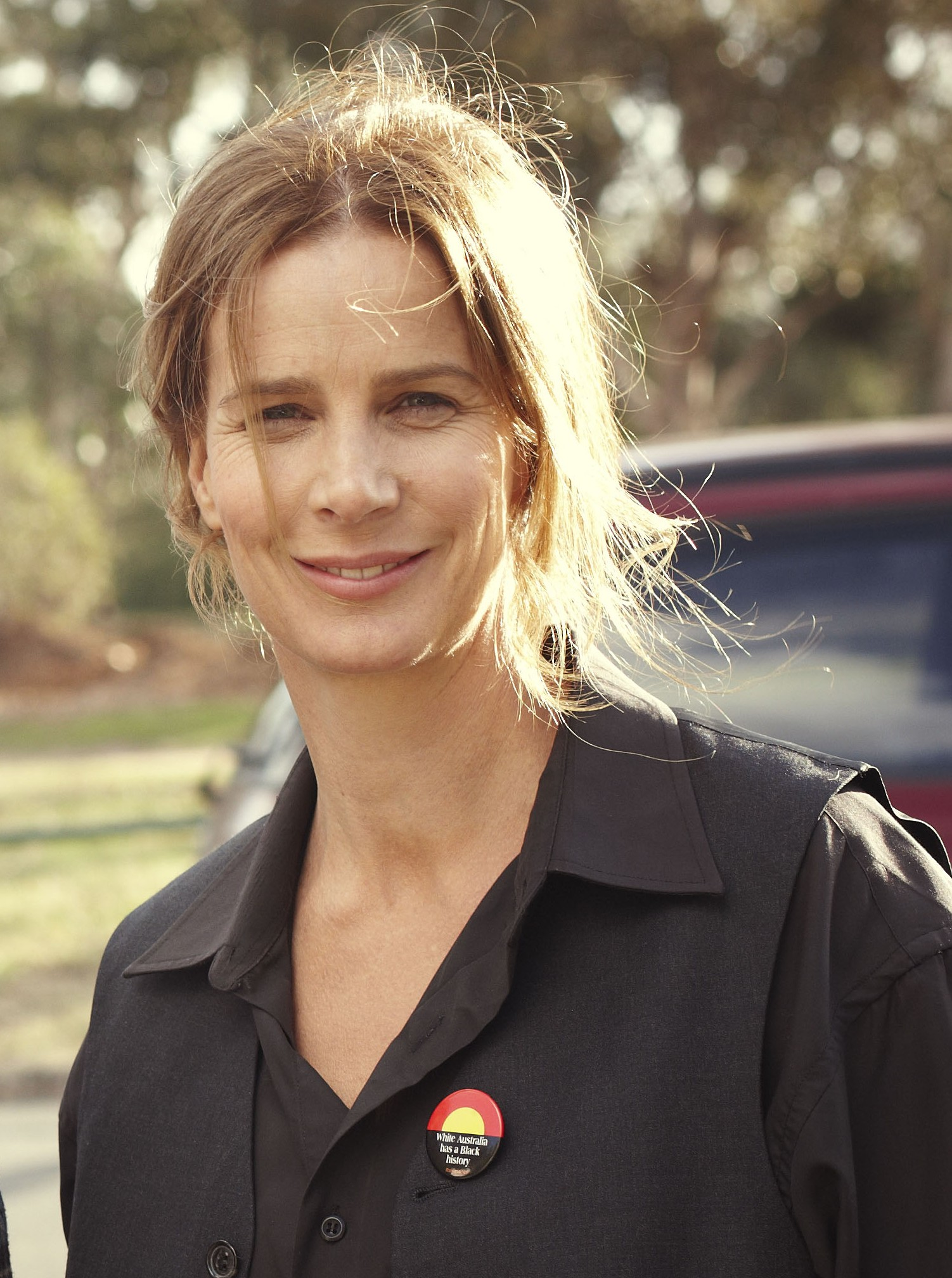
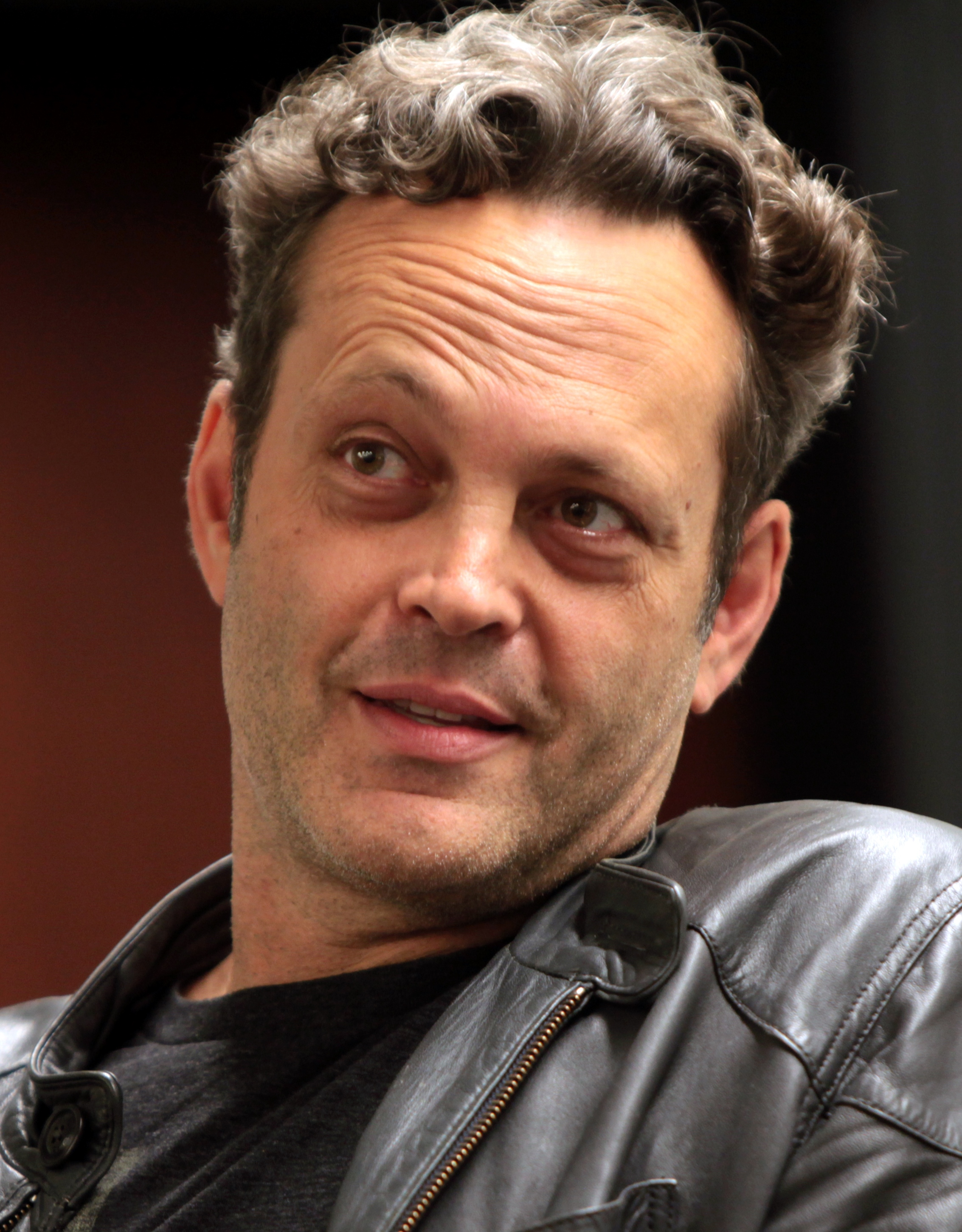
- Top row: (left to right) Andrew Garfield, Sam Worthington and Luke Bracey
- Bottom row: (left to right) Teresa Palmer, Hugo Weaving, Rachel Griffiths and Vince Vaughn
- Andrew Garfield as Private Desmond Doss
- Sam Worthington as Captain Jack Glover
- Luke Bracey as Private "Smitty" Ryker
- Hugo Weaving as Corporal Tom Doss, Desmond's father
- Teresa Palmer as Dorothy Schutte, Desmond's wife
- Rachel Griffiths as Bertha Doss, Desmond's mother
- Vince Vaughn as Sergeant Howell
- Ryan Corr as Lieutenant Manville
- Richard Roxburgh as Colonel Stelzer
- Luke Pegler as Private Milt "Hollywood" Zane
- Richard Pyros as Randall "Teach" Fuller
- Ben Mingay as "Grease" Nolan
- Michael Sheasby as "Tex" Lewis
- Firass Dirani as Vito Rinnelli
- Damien Thomlinson as Ralph Morgan
- Matt Nable as Lieutenant Colonel Cooney
- Ben O'Toole as Corporal Jessop
- Nathaniel Buzolic as Harold "Hal" Doss, Desmond's brother
- Milo Gibson as "Lucky" Ford
- Philip Quast as Judge
- Goran D. Kleut as Andy "Ghoul" Walker
- Nico Cortez as Wal Kirzinski
- Tyler Coppin as Lynchburg Doctor
- John Batziolas as Schulenburg, Rescued Private
- Bill Young as Brigadier General Musgrove
- Robert Morgan as Colonel Sangston
- Benedict Hardie as Captain Daniels

== Production ==
=== Development ===
Hacksaw Ridge was in development limbo for 14 years. Numerous producers had tried for decades to film Desmond Doss's story, including decorated war hero Audie Murphy and Hal B. Wallis.

In 2001, after finally convincing Doss that making a movie on his remarkable life was the right thing to do, screenwriter/producer Gregory Crosby (grandson of Bing Crosby) wrote the treatment and brought the project to film producer David Permut, of Permut Presentations, through the early cooperation of Stan Jensen of the Seventh-day Adventist Church, which ultimately led to the film being financed. Crosby also co-produced the movie.

In 2004, director Terry Benedict won the rights to make a documentary about Doss, The Conscientious Objector, and secured the dramatic film rights in the process. However, Doss died in 2006, after which producer Bill Mechanic acquired and then sold the rights to Walden Media, which developed the project along with producer David Permut. Walden Media insisted on a PG-13 version of the battle, and Mechanic spent years working to buy the rights back.

After acquiring the rights, Mechanic approached Mel Gibson, and wanted him to create a concoction of violence and faith, as he did with The Passion of the Christ (2004). Gibson turned down the offer twice, as he previously did with Braveheart (1995). Nearly a decade later, Gibson finally agreed to direct, a decision announced in November 2014. The same month, Andrew Garfield was confirmed to play the role of Desmond Doss.

With a budget of $40 million, the team still faced many challenges. Hacksaw Ridge became an international co-production, with key players and firms located in both the United States and Australia. When Australian tax incentives were taken off the table, the film had to qualify as Australian to receive government subsidies. Despite being American-born, Gibson's early years in Australia helped the film qualify, along with most of the cast being Australian, including Rachel Griffiths, Teresa Palmer, Sam Worthington, Hugo Weaving, Richard Roxburgh, Richard Pyros and Luke Bracey. Rounding out the cast was American actor Vince Vaughn. According to producer Bill Mechanic, Australian state and federal subsidies made financing the film possible. James M. Vernon, an Australian executive producer on Hacksaw Ridge, helped the film qualify for Australian government subsidies.

On February 9, 2015, IM Global closed a deal to provide co-financing for the film by pre-selling the movie to international distributors globally. On the same day, Lionsgate (under its Summit Entertainment label) acquired the US distribution rights to the film. Chinese distribution rights were later acquired by Bliss Media, a Shanghai-based film production and distribution company.

Hacksaw Ridge is the first film directed by Gibson since Apocalypto in 2006, and is a departure from his previous films, such as Apocalypto and Braveheart, in which the protagonists acted violently.

=== Writing ===
Robert Schenkkan made the initial draft and Randall Wallace, who was previously attached to direct the film, rewrote the script. Andrew Knight polished the revised script. Gibson's business partner Bruce Davey also produced the film, along with Paul Currie.

=== Casting ===
The cast—Andrew Garfield, Vince Vaughn, Sam Worthington, Luke Bracey, Teresa Palmer, Rachel Griffiths, Richard Roxburgh, Luke Pegler, Richard Pyros, Ben Mingay, Firass Dirani, Nico Cortez, Michael Sheasby, Goran Kleut, Jacob Warner, Harry Greenwood, Damien Thomlinson, Ben O'Toole, Benedict Hardie, Robert Morgan, Ori Pfeffer, Milo Gibson, and Nathaniel Buzolic, Hugo Weaving, and Ryan Corr—was announced between November 2014 and October 2015. The younger Doss was played by Darcy Bryce.

Garfield plays Desmond Doss, a US Army medic awarded the Medal of Honor by President Harry S. Truman for saving lives during the Battle of Okinawa in World War II. Garfield had high regard for Doss, and venerated him for his act of bravery, hailing him as a "wonderful symbol of embodying the idea of live and let live no matter what your ideology is, no matter what your value system is, just to allow other people to be who they are and allow yourself to be who you are." He found the idea of playing a real superhero, as compared to his past roles playing Spider-Man in The Amazing Spider-Man and its sequel, much more inspiring. Garfield admitted that he cried the first time he read the screenplay. He visited Doss' hometown and touched his various tools. Gibson was drawn to Garfield the first time he saw his performance in The Social Network.

=== Principal photography ===
Principal photography started on September 29, 2015, and lasted for 59 days, ending in December of that year. Filming took place entirely in Australia. The film was based at Fox Studios in Sydney, after producers vigorously scouted for locations around the country. Filming took place mostly in the state of New South Wales.

The cliff was filmed at a disused "Long Street Quarry" adjacent to the Main Southern railway line north of Goulburn. The grounds of Newington Armory at Sydney Olympic Park were used as Fort Jackson. Filming in Bringelly required the team to clear and deforest over 500 hectares of land, which evoked the ire of some environmentalists. However, the producers had complete approval and clearance to do so. Conditions were imposed to replant and rehabilitate part of the land after filming. According to Minister for the Arts, Troy Grant, the film brought 720 jobs and US$19 million to regional and rural New South Wales. Filming locations included Richmond, Bringelly, and Oran Park and Centennial Park.

Altogether, three jeeps, two trucks, and a tank were featured in the film. Bulldozers and backhoes were used to transform a dairy pasture near Sydney to re-create the Okinawa battlefield. A berm had to be raised around the perimeter so cameras could turn 360 degrees without getting any eucalyptus trees in the background. Gibson did not want to rely heavily on computer visual effects, either on the screen or in pre-visualizing the battle scenes. Visual effects were used only during bloody scenes, like napalm-burnt soldiers. During filming of the battle scenes, Gibson incorporated his past war-movie experiences, and would yell to the actors, reminding them constantly of what they were fighting for.

=== Post-production ===
Kevin O'Connell, who won his first Academy Awards for sound mixing in this film after 21 nominations, stated budget constraints forced him to use archival sounds of WWII-era weapons.

== Music ==
James Horner was originally approached to compose the score for the film but was replaced by John Debney after Horner's death in 2015. Debney was himself replaced by Rupert Gregson-Williams after his score was rejected before Hacksaw Ridge was set to premiere at the Venice Film Festival. When composing the music Gregson-Williams commented: "The soundtrack is really in two parts. A lovely romance blossoms as Desmond discovers both the love of his life and his faith. The second half of the movie is brutal. We wanted to reflect his spirituality without being pious, and his bravery without celebrating violence." The film's accompanying score was recorded at Abbey Road Studios in London, with an orchestra of 70 musicians and a 36-voice choir conducted by Cliff Masterson.

== Themes ==
Critics described Hacksaw Ridge as an anti-war film with pacifist themes, which also incorporates recurring religious imagery, such as baptism and ascension.

== Historical accuracy ==
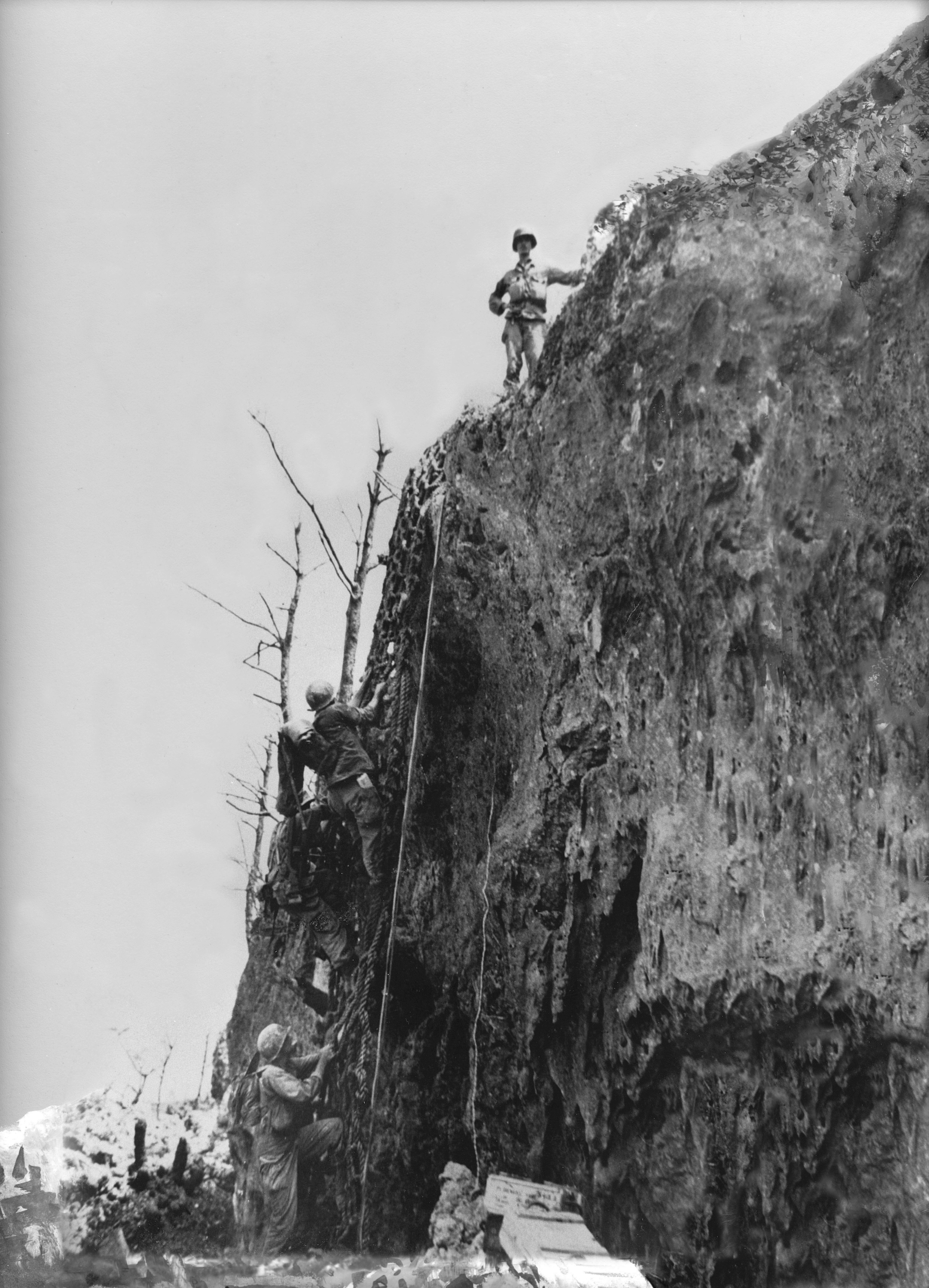
Doss on top of the Maeda Escarpment, May 4, 1945

After the war, Doss turned down many requests for books and film versions of his actions, because he was wary of his life, wartime experiences, and Seventh-day Adventist beliefs being portrayed inaccurately or sensationally. Doss's only child, Desmond Doss Jr., stated: "The reason he declined is that none of them adhered to his one requirement: that it be accurate. And I find it remarkable, the level of accuracy in adhering to the principle of the story in this movie." Producer David Permut stated that the filmmakers took great care in maintaining the integrity of the story, since Doss was very religious.

Several details about Doss's life were changed, most notably the story of his father William Thomas Doss. According to Lynchburg, Virginia newspapers dated October 18, 1918, William Thomas Doss was among a large number of draftees. The war ended however 24 days later and he was therefore discharged on November 21st, 1918, so his father never fought overseas in WWI. In reality, William Thomas Doss was not a violent alcoholic who beat his wife as depicted in the film, and had given up smoking and drinking after becoming a Seventh-day Adventist whilst Desmond was a child. The incident with the gun Doss took out of his alcoholic father's hands also occurred under different circumstances, and several liberties were taken regarding the depiction of his first marriage. The character of Smitty, portrayed by Luke Bracey, is an amalgamation of various soldiers who tormented Doss and was created for narrative reasons.

While Doss was harassed by others during basic training for his religious views, the platoon sergeant did not penalize all of the soldiers in the barracks for Doss's refusal to handle a weapon, nor was he beaten by other soldiers. Doss was never court-martialed for his refusal to bear arms as depicted in the film, and did not miss his wedding to Dorothy Schutte as the two had married before Doss was inducted into active service. As the court martial did not occur, Thomas Doss did not prevent his son from being convicted by presenting a letter from his former CO to the judge.

Another change is Harold Doss, who is shown serving in the Army, when in reality, he served in the Navy onboard the USS Lindsey (DD-771). Other changes occur near the end of the film, when Doss is placed on a stretcher. In real life, Doss had another wounded man take his place on the stretcher. After treating the soldier, a sniper shot fractured Doss's arm, and he crawled 300 yards (270 m) to safety after being left alone for five hours. Gibson omitted that from the film because he felt that the audience would not find the scene believable. The film omits his prior combat service in the Battle of Guam and Battle of Leyte. Doss was awarded the Bronze Star Medal for extraordinary bravery in both battles. The film also depicts Doss as still being an outcast on Okinawa, when he was already respected by his fellow soldiers for his previous actions.

The movie leaves the impression Doss's actions during the battle of Okinawa took place over a period of a few days, but his Medal of Honor citation covered his actions over a period of about three weeks (April 29 to May 21). The visual blog Information is Beautiful stated that the film was 52.7% accurate when compared to real-life events, summarizing that "most of the main war-related events did take place, although not all in the timeframe of the film... also, much of the pre-war stuff is either invented or distorted".

== Release ==
The world premiere of Hacksaw Ridge occurred on September 4, 2016, at the 73rd Venice Film Festival, where it received a 10-minute standing ovation. The film was released in Australia on November 3, 2016, by Icon Film Distribution, and in the United States on November 4, 2016, by Lionsgate/Summit Entertainment. It was released by Bliss Media in China in December, and in the United Kingdom in 2017, with IM Global handling international sales.

=== Marketing ===
On July 28, 2016, Lionsgate released the only official trailer for Hacksaw Ridge which garnered millions of views. In partnership with Disabled American Veterans, Gibson screened the film at both the DAV National Convention and VFW National Convention in August 2016 to raise awareness of veterans' issues. In August, Gibson also appeared at Pastor Greg Laurie's SoCal Harvest in Anaheim, California to promote the film.

A number of Seventh-day Adventist ministries offered free copies of the Hero of Hacksaw Ridge book during the film's release, as well as created promotional materials to highlight Doss's faith. On February 24, 2017, Reto-Moto and Lionsgate announced a cross-promotion where the purchase of a DLC pack for Heroes & Generals would also give the purchaser a digital copy of the film.

== Reception ==
=== Box office ===
Hacksaw Ridge grossed $67.2 million in the United States and Canada and $113.4 million in other countries for a worldwide total of $180.6 million, against a production budget of $40 million.

The film opened alongside Doctor Strange and Trolls, and was projected to gross around $12 million from 2,886 theaters. It made $5.2 million on its first day and $15.2 million in its opening weekend, finishing third at the box office behind Doctor Strange and Trolls. The debut was on par with the $15 million opening of Gibson's previous directorial effort, Apocalypto, in 2006. In its second weekend, the film grossed $10.6 million (a drop of just 30%), finishing 5th at the box office.

The film also opened successfully in China, grossing over $16 million in its first four days at the box office and over $60 million in total.

=== Critical response ===
On review aggregator Rotten Tomatoes, the film has an approval rating of 84% based on 282 reviews, with an average rating of 7.30/10. The site's critical consensus reads: "Hacksaw Ridge uses a real-life pacifist's legacy to lay the groundwork for a gripping wartime tribute to faith, valor, and the courage of remaining true to one's convictions." On Metacritic, the film has a weighted average score of 71 out of 100, based on 47 critics, indicating "generally favorable" reviews. Audiences polled by CinemaScore gave an average grade of "A" on an A+ to F scale, while PostTrak reported filmgoers gave it a 91% overall positive score and a 67% "definite recommend".

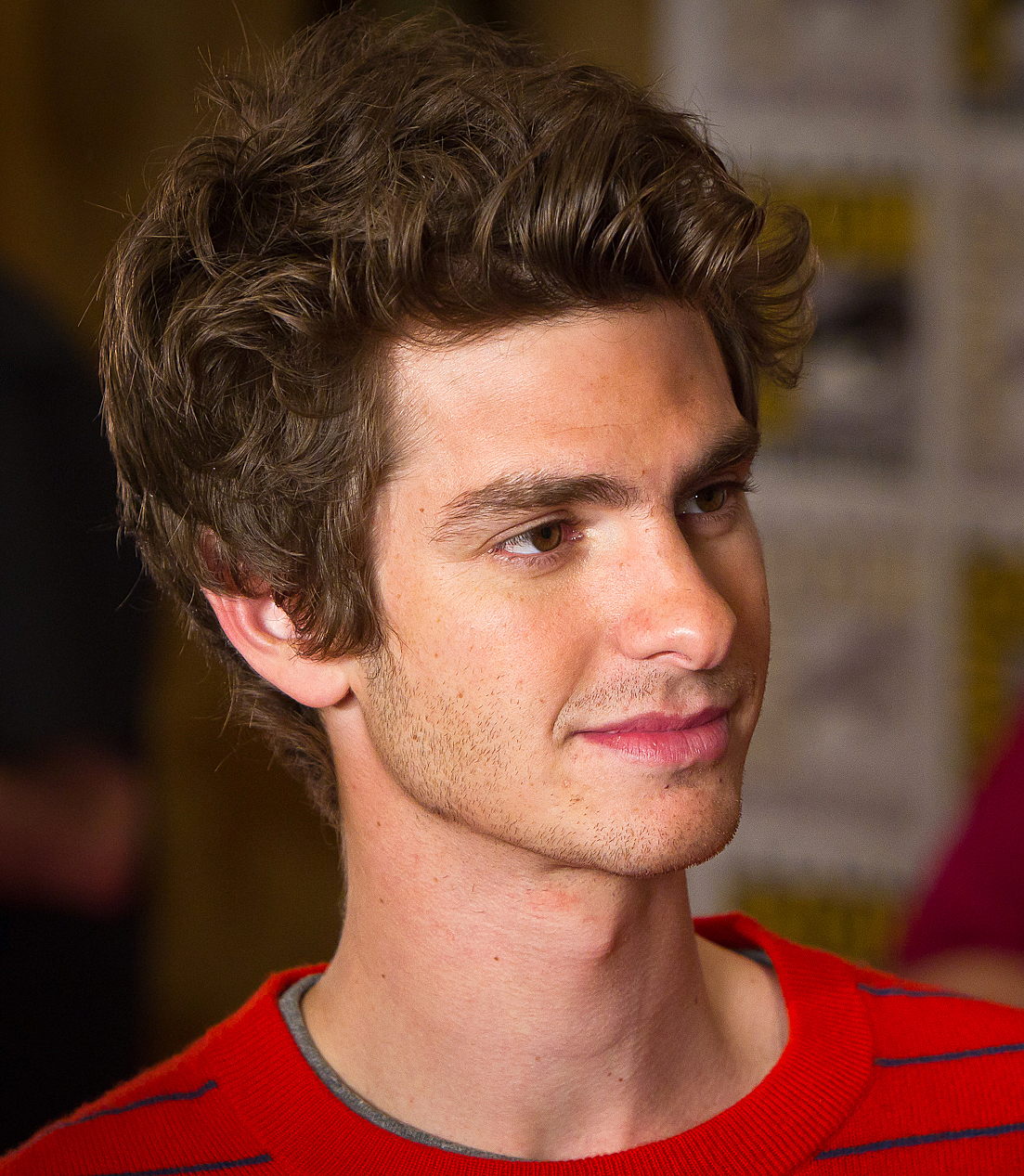
Andrew Garfield's performance garnered critical acclaim and he received his first Academy Award nomination, his third BAFTA nomination and also his second Golden Globe & SAG nomination.

The Milford Daily News called the film a "masterpiece", adding that it "is going to end up on many 2016 Top 10 lists, that should get Oscar nominations for Best Actor, Best Director, and Best Picture". Maggie Stancu of Movie Pilot wrote that "Gibson made some of his most genius directing choices in Hacksaw Ridge, and Garfield has given his best performance yet. With amazing performances by Vince Vaughn, Teresa Palmer, Sam Worthington and Hugo Weaving, it is absolutely one of 2016's must-see films."

Mick LaSalle of SFGate called the film "a brilliant return for Mel Gibson, which confirms his position as a director with a singular talent for spectacle and a sure way with actors". In The Film Lawyers, Samar Khan called Hacksaw Ridge "fantastic" and emphasised "just how wonderful it is to have Gibson back in a more prominent position in Hollywood, hopefully with the demons of his past behind him. If Hacksaw Ridge is any indication, we are poised for a future filled with great films from the visionary director."

The Daily Telegraph awarded four out of five, and added: "Hacksaw Ridge is a fantastically moving and bruising war film that hits you like a raw topside of beef in the face—a kind of primary-coloured Guernica that flourishes on a big screen with a crowd."

The Guardian also awarded the film four out of five, and stated that Gibson had "absolutely hit Hacksaw Ridge out of the park." The Australian's reviewer was equally positive, stating that, as a director, "Gibson's approach is bold and fearless; this represents his best work to date behind the camera". Rex Reed of Observer rated it four out of five, and called it "the best war film since Saving Private Ryan... [I]t is violent, harrowing, heartbreaking and unforgettable. And yes, it was directed by Mel Gibson. He deserves a medal, too".

Michael Smith of Tulsa World called Hacksaw Ridge a "moving character study" and praised both the direction and acting: "It's truly remarkable how Gibson can film scenes of such heartfelt emotion with such sweet subtlety as easily as he stages some of the most vicious, visual scenes of violence that you will ever see. ... Hacksaw Ridge is beautiful and brutal, and that's a potent combination for a movie about a man determined to serve his country, as well as his soul."

IGN critic Alex Welch gave a score of eight out of ten, praising it as "one of the most successful war films of recent memory. . at times horrifying, inspiring, and heart-wrenching". Mike Ryan of Uproxx gave the film a positive review, praising Gibson's direction, and saying: "There are two moments during the second half of Mel Gibson's Hacksaw Ridge when I literally jumped out of my seat in terror. The film's depiction of war is the best I've seen since Saving Private Ryan."

Peter Travers of Rolling Stone gave the film three and a half out of five, writing: "Thanks to some of the greatest battle scenes ever filmed, Gibson once again shows his staggering gifts as a filmmaker, able to juxtapose savagery with aching tenderness." In contrast, Matt Zoller Seitz for RogerEbert.com gave the film two and a half out of four stars, and described the film as "a movie at war with itself."

Some accused the depiction of the Japanese as racist, describing their portrayal as falling in line with Orientalist stereotypes of easterners as "crazed and animalistic" by showing the enemy soldiers "wildly screaming and yelling with contorted, exaggerated expressions." One reviewer criticized the film's only scene from the Japanese perspective depicting an officer committing seppuku, describing it as "the story only acknowledging the Japanese viewpoint if it means getting to show outlandish gore and violence."

=== Accolades and awards ===
Hacksaw Ridge won Best Film Editing and Best Sound Mixing and was nominated for Best Picture, Best Director, Best Actor for Garfield, and Best Sound Editing at the Academy Awards. The film won Best Editing and was nominated for Best Actor in a Leading Role for Garfield, Best Adapted Screenplay, Best Sound, and Best Makeup and Hair at the British Academy Film Awards. The film won Best Action Movie and Best Actor in an Action Movie for Garfield and was nominated for Best Picture, Best Director, Best Actor for Garfield, Best Editing, and Best Hair and Makeup at the Critics' Choice Awards. It also won a Faith & Freedom Award at the 2017 MovieGuide Awards.

The film received three nominations at the Golden Globe Awards, including Best Motion Picture – Drama, Best Actor – Motion Picture Drama for Garfield, and Best Director. The film won Best Actor for Garfield, Best Film Editing and Best Sound and was nominated for Best Film, Best Director, Best Adapted Screenplay, Best Cinematography, Best Original Score, and Best Art Direction and Production Design at the Satellite Awards.

== See also ==
- Joseph G. LaPointe Jr., U.S. Army combat medic who received the Medal of Honor for actions in Vietnam
- Thomas W. Bennett, U.S. Army combat medic who received the Medal of Honor for actions in Vietnam
