= Harold A. Garman =

United States Army Medal of Honor recipient

Harold Alva Garman
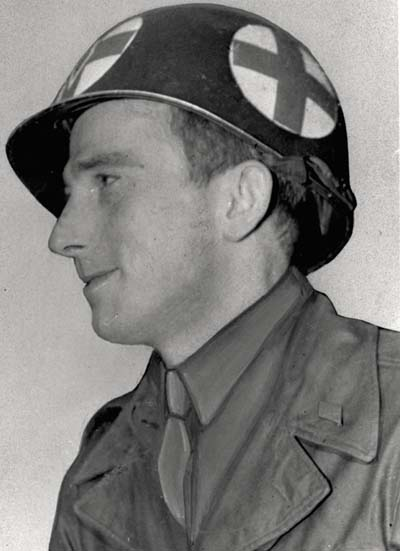
- Born: February 26, 1918; Fairfield, Illinois, US
- Died: August 13, 1992 (aged 74); Albion, Illinois, US
- Burial place: Samaria Baptist Church, Albion, Illinois
- Military career
- Allegiance: United States
- Branch: United States Army
- Service years: 1942–1946
- Rank: Technician Fifth Grade
- Units: 5th Medical Battalion, 5th Infantry Division
- Conflicts: World War II
- Awards: Medal of Honor

Harold Alva Garman (February 26, 1918 – August 13, 1992) was a United States Army soldier, combat medic and a recipient of the United States military's highest decoration—the Medal of Honor—for his actions in World War II.

== Biography ==
Garman joined the Army from Albion, Illinois in 1942, and by August 25, 1944, was a private serving as a medic in Company B, 5th Medical Battalion, 5th Infantry Division. On that day, near Montereau, France, he participated in the evacuation of wounded soldiers across the Seine river. When a boat loaded with wounded came under fire from a German machine gun on the opposite bank, Garman dove into the river, swam into the machine gun fire to reach the boat and towed it to safety. For these actions, he was awarded the Medal of Honor seven months later, on March 29, 1945 in Lich, Germany. A short excerpt of his award ceremony can be seen in the US Army's film "The Famous Third Army in WWII | Patton’s 3rd Army" from 22:50 - 23:25.

Garman reached the rank of technician fifth grade before leaving the Army.

He married Mary I. Jones and had two children, Steven and Sherry. He died at age 74 and was buried at Samaria Baptist Church in Albion, Illinois.

== Medal of Honor citation ==
Private Garman's official Medal of Honor citation reads:

For conspicuous gallantry and intrepidity at the risk of his life above and beyond the call of duty. On 25 August 1944, in the vicinity of Montereau, France, the enemy was sharply contesting any enlargement of the bridgehead which our forces had established on the northern bank of the Seine River in this sector. Casualties were being evacuated to the southern shore in assault boats paddled by litter bearers from a medical battalion. Pvt. Garman, also a litter bearer in this battalion, was working on the friendly shore carrying the wounded from the boats to waiting ambulances. As 1 boatload of wounded reached midstream, a German machinegun suddenly opened fire upon it from a commanding position on the northern bank 100 yards away. All of the men in the boat immediately took to the water except 1 man who was so badly wounded he could not rise from his litter. Two other patients who were unable to swim because of their wounds clung to the sides of the boat. Seeing the extreme danger of these patients, Pvt. Garman without a moment's hesitation plunged into the Seine. Swimming directly into a hail of machinegun bullets, he rapidly reached the assault boat and then while still under accurately aimed fire towed the boat with great effort to the southern shore. This soldier's moving heroism not only saved the lives of the three patients but so inspired his comrades that additional assault boats were immediately procured and the evacuation of the wounded resumed. Pvt. Garman's great courage and his heroic devotion to the highest tenets of the Medical Corps may be written with great pride in the annals of the corps.

== Awards and decorations ==

Badge	Combat Medical Badge		
1st row	Medal of Honor	Bronze Star Medal	Army Good Conduct Medal
2nd row	American Campaign Medal	European–African–Middle Eastern Campaign Medal with 1 campaign star	World War II Victory Medal

== See also ==
- List of Medal of Honor recipients
- List of Medal of Honor recipients for World War II
- Desmond Doss
- Thomas W. Bennett
- Joseph G. LaPointe Jr.
- Gary M. Rose
