= Gary M. Rose =

US Army officer (born 1947)

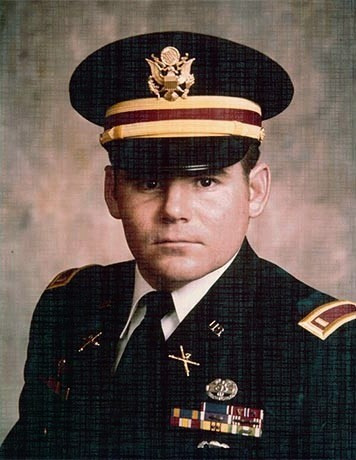
- Rose in February 1975 at Fort Sill
- Born: 17 October 1947 (age 78); Watertown, New York
- Military career
- Allegiance: United States
- Branch: United States Army
- Service years: 1967–1987
- Rank: Captain
- Nickname: Mike
- Unit: Military Assistance Command, Vietnam – Studies and Observations Group (administratively 5th Special Forces Group, Airborne)
- Conflicts: Vietnam War: Operation Tailwind
- Awards: Medal of Honor; Bronze Star Medal (2); Purple Heart (3); Meritorious Service Medal; Air Medal; Army Commendation Medal
- Other work: Manufacturing industry training manual writer

Gary Michael Rose (born 17 October 1947) is a retired United States Army officer and a Vietnam War veteran. For his actions during the war, Rose was recommended for the Medal of Honor, but this was downgraded to the Distinguished Service Cross due to the classified nature of the mission in Laos. He was finally presented the Medal of Honor on 23 October 2017.

After enlisting in the United States Army in 1967, Rose became a Special Forces combat medic, and in September 1970 distinguished himself in fighting in Laos at Chavane during Operation Tailwind, in which he treated the wounded while fighting People's Army of Vietnam (PAVN) forces. Despite being wounded multiple times during the battle, he treated 60–70 personnel. Rose continued his career in the army and graduated from Officer Candidate School, becoming a Field Artillery officer and reaching the rank of captain before retiring, after which he worked in the manufacturing industry.

== Early life ==
Rose was born on 17 October 1947 in Watertown, New York, and later moved to the Los Angeles area. In 1965, he graduated from the James Monroe High School in Sepulveda. On 4 April 1967, he volunteered for the United States Army to avoid being drafted into the Marine Corps after his father, who had been in the Marine Corps during World War II, suggested one would not want to be a draftee in the Marine Corps.

== Vietnam War ==
Rose attended basic training at Fort Ord and Infantry Advanced Individual Training at Fort Gordon. He was promoted to private first class after graduating from the latter and was sent to the United States Army Airborne School due to his high aptitude test scores. Rose entered Special Forces training at Fort Bragg in October, graduating a year later as a Special Forces medic. Rose was first assigned to the 7th Special Forces Group (Airborne). He reenlisted to be able to choose where he wanted to serve and in April 1969 was assigned to the 46th Special Forces Company in Lopburi, Thailand, where he trained Thai soldiers and border police medics.

In April 1970, Rose requested transfer to South Vietnam and was assigned to Military Assistance Command, Vietnam – Studies and Observations Group (SOG), for which the 5th Special Forces Group (Airborne) provided administrative support. He was based at Forward Operating Base II at Kontum, where he treated the wounded and local civilians. Rose was wounded on his first mission in June 1970, receiving his first Purple Heart and Bronze Star Medal. On 11 September, he and a company-size exploitation force of Americans, Vietnamese, and Montagnards were inserted by CH-53 Sea Stallion helicopters 70 kilometers inside Laos near Chavane in Operation Tailwind, a diversionary operation. Then-Sergeant Rose was responsible for medical care for fifteen other Americans and 120 Montagnards.

=== Medal of Honor action ===
After being inserted, the force advanced deeper into enemy territory, soon making contact with a PAVN squad, wounding two Americans and two Montagnards, one of whom was trapped outside the unit's defensive perimeter. Rose engaged the enemy while treating and stabilizing the soldier, carrying him through heavy fire back to the defensive positions. The company continued moving deeper into Laos following a PAVN withdrawal, engaging more PAVN forces and suffering more casualties. Disregarding his personal safety, Rose treated wounded under heavy fire, engaging the PAVN to reach the wounded.

The fire became so intense Rose was forced to crawl from position to position in order to treat the wounded, giving words of encouragement and directing the fire of the inexperienced and terrified South Vietnamese and Montagnard troops. Over the next few days, the company marched west and deeper into Laos, fending off incessant attacks from elements ranging from squad-sized to company-sized, covered by Air Force gunships. On 12 September, during an assault by a PAVN company-sized element, one of the Montagnards was wounded 40 to 50 meters outside the perimeter. Dodging enemy fire, Rose ran and crawled his way to the wounded man, shielding him with his own body while he treated him. He dragged the Montagnard back to the company with one hand while firing at the PAVN with his gun in his other hand.

When Rose returned to the company perimeter with the wounded soldier, he was sprayed with shrapnel from a B-40 rocket propelled grenade (RPG) in his back and leg, severely crippling his foot. For the rest of the mission, he used a stick as a crutch, continuing to treat the wounded while ignoring his own wounds. A MEDEVAC helicopter was later called in to evacuate the company's many wounded, but was unable to land in the small opening where the company was located. Rose stood up, fully exposed to the heavy enemy fire, and attempted to pass the wounded up to the hovering helicopter's crew. However, the intensity of the fire forced the pilot to abort the mission, and the helicopter, severely damaged, crashed a few kilometers away.

With the aid of close air support, the company was able to break out of their defensive position and Rose improvised litters for the wounded, who now were over half the company. Despite his own wounds, he never took time to eat, rest or care for his own wounds while treating the other soldiers. On the night of 13–14 September, the company was surrounded by the PAVN in their position. Rose dug trenches for the wounded and treated their injuries, as the enemy spent the night bombarding the company with rockets, grenades, and mortars. Moving from position to position, he exposed himself to PAVN fire, encouraging the soldiers and treating the wounded.

On 14 September, the last day of the operation, after destroying a PAVN base camp, the company was informed by a Forward Air Controller (FAC) that over 500 PAVN were advancing on their position. Supported by gunships, the company moved to a landing zone, setting up a perimeter while each platoon boarded the helicopters as the PAVN attacked from all sides, inflicting even more casualties. Rose exposed himself again under heavy fire, retrieving the dead and wounded and bringing them back to the perimeter. In great pain, he continued to treat the wounded, disregarding his own safety. When the extraction helicopters arrived, he returned to the outer perimeter to help engage the PAVN and repel the assault. Rose boarded the last extraction helicopter, delivering aimed accurate fire at the PAVN only an estimated 50 meters away as he hobbled up the loading ramp.

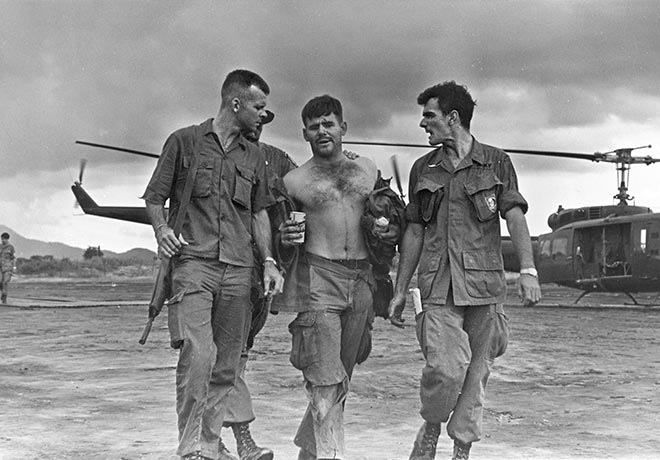
Rose being helped from a helicopter after Operation Tailwind, 14 May 1970

Soon after the helicopter lifted off, it was hit by anti-aircraft rounds, and its engine stopped at an altitude of 4,500 feet (1,400 m). Rose was notified that a Marine door gunner had been shot through the neck and he rendered lifesaving medical treatment to the man before the helicopter crashed, several kilometers away from the original extraction point. Rose was thrown from the helicopter before it crashed, and while still dazed and wounded crawled back into the wreckage to pull out wounded and unconscious soldiers, knowing that it could explode at any moment. He continued to treat the wounded until another helicopter arrived to extract them. Upon returning to base, Rose, covered in blood and wounds, refused all treatment until the other wounded were treated first. He was credited with treating between 60 and 70 wounded and saving many lives; only three Montagnards died in Operation Tailwind.

Rose was nominated for the Medal of Honor, but the award was downgraded to the Distinguished Service Cross due to the classified nature of the mission in Laos. MACV commander General Creighton Abrams formally presented Rose the Distinguished Service Cross on 16 January 1971.

== Later life ==
In April, when his tour in Vietnam ended, Rose was sent to the Spanish Language School in Anacostia, Washington, D.C. At the school Rose made the decision to attend Officer Candidate School because extending his contract with the Army would enable him to bring his new wife, Margaret, with him to Panama. After completing the school, he was assigned to the 8th Special Forces Group in Panama until August 1973, when he was selected to attend Officer Candidate School at Fort Benning. Rose received his commission as a second lieutenant in the Field Artillery in December, and attended the Field Artillery Officer Basic Course at Fort Sill. He graduated from Cameron University in Lawton with a Bachelor of Arts in Education and Military Science in December 1977. In 1978, Rose attended the Field Artillery Officer Advanced Course, and then was posted to various successive field assignments in Germany, New Mexico, South Korea, and Fort Sill over the next years. He retired from the Army with the rank of captain in May 1987.

Rose attended the University of Oklahoma, graduating in December 1989 with a Master of Arts in Communication. He worked as a writer of operator, user, and maintenance manuals and training designer for the manufacturing industry before finally retiring in 2010. Rose worked at Raytheon, which he left in 2003. He moved to Huntsville in 2005 to live near a friend who was a fellow Vietnam War veteran. In retirement, Rose remains involved in charity work, mainly through the Knights of Columbus.

=== Operation Tailwind controversy and Medal of Honor award ===
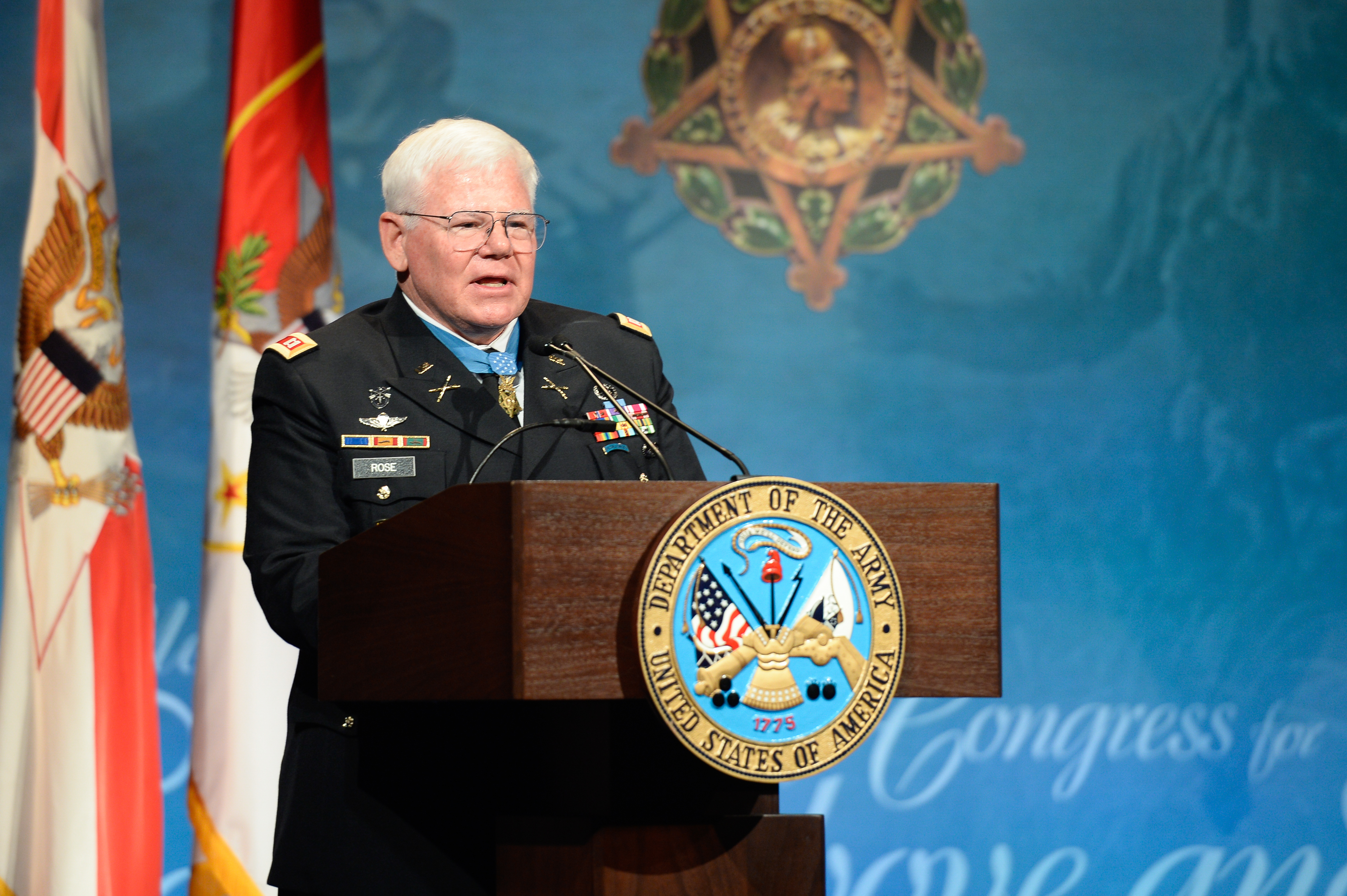
Rose speaking at the Pentagon one day after receiving the Medal of Honor

In 1998, a joint CNN and Time magazine report incorrectly described Operation Tailwind as a mission to kill American defectors and claimed that American troops used sarin on civilians. Rose was among the Tailwind veterans called to the Pentagon in late June for interviews on the operation, and they refuted the claims. The story was retracted after a Department of Defense report concluded that the story was incorrect. After the controversy, an initiative began by SOG veterans to get their comrades' heroism in Operation Tailwind recognized. In 2013, Rose received a call from Eugene McCarley, who commanded the company in Operation Tailwind, who told him that Army veteran and SOG researcher Neil Thorne wanted to request an upgrade to the Medal of Honor for Rose's DSC. Thorne requested information from Rose, and then-Secretary of Defense Ash Carter approved the award upgrade in 2016, and Alabama Representative Mo Brooks and Senator Jeff Sessions wrote Rose's name into the National Defense Authorization Act for Fiscal Year 2017, waiving the requirement the medal must be awarded within five years of the action. On 20 September 2017, the White House announced President Donald Trump would present Rose the Medal of Honor on 23 October. On 23 October, President Donald J. Trump presented Rose the Medal of Honor in a White House ceremony.

== Personal life ==
Rose married Margaret in 1971 and has two daughters: Claire Rose and Sarah Bowen, and a son, Michael.

Rose is a member of the Sons of the American Revolution (SAR). He was inducted as a compatriot after proving his direct descent from Francois Cailhol, an 18th-century French colonial resident who served as a militiaman in the 1st Company of the St. Louis Militia under Captain Don Juan Baptista Martiny during the American Revolutionary War. As a living Medal of Honor recipient and a member of the organization, he is recognized on the SAR's official timeline of distinguished compatriot veterans. Rose frequently participates in SAR events, including serving as a keynote speaker and taking part in commemorative wreath-laying ceremonies for early American veterans.

== Medal of Honor citation ==
Rose's Medal of Honor citation reads:

Sergeant Gary M. Rose distinguished himself by acts of gallantry and intrepidity while serving as a Special Forces Medic with a company-sized exploitation force, Special Operations Augmentation, Command and Control Central, 5th Special Forces Group (Airborne), 1st Special Forces, Republic of Vietnam.

Between 11 and 14 September 1970, Sergeant Rose’s company was continuously engaged by a well-armed and numerically superior hostile force deep in enemy-controlled territory. Enemy B-40 rockets and mortar rounds rained down while the adversary sprayed the area with small arms and machine gun fire, wounding many and forcing everyone to seek cover.

Sergeant Rose, braving the hail of bullets, sprinted fifty meters to a wounded soldier’s side. He then used his own body to protect the casualty from further injury while treating his wounds. After stabilizing the casualty, Sergeant Rose carried him through the bullet-ridden combat zone to protective cover.

As the enemy accelerated the attack, Sergeant Rose continuously exposed himself to intense fire as he fearlessly moved from casualty to casualty, administering life-saving aid.

A B-40 rocket impacted just meters from Sergeant Rose, knocking him from his feet and injuring his head, hand, and foot. Ignoring his wounds, Sergeant Rose struggled to his feet and continued to render aid to the other injured soldiers.

During an attempted medevac, Sergeant Rose again exposed himself to enemy fire as he attempted to hoist wounded personnel up to the hovering helicopter, which was unable to land due to unsuitable terrain.

The medevac mission was aborted due to intense enemy fire and the helicopter crashed a few miles away due to the enemy fire sustained during the attempted extraction.

Over the next two days, Sergeant Rose continued to expose himself to enemy fire in order to treat the wounded, estimated to be half of the company’s personnel. On September 14, during the company’s eventual helicopter extraction, the enemy launched a full-scale offensive.

Sergeant Rose, after loading wounded personnel on the first set of extraction helicopters, returned to the outer perimeter under enemy fire, carrying friendly casualties and moving wounded personnel to more secure positions until they could be evacuated. He then returned to the perimeter to help repel the enemy until the final extraction helicopter arrived. As the final helicopter was loaded, the enemy began to overrun the company’s position, and the helicopter’s Marine door gunner was shot in the neck.

Sergeant Rose instantly administered critical medical treatment onboard the helicopter, saving the Marine’s life. The helicopter carrying Sergeant Rose crashed several hundred meters from the extraction point, further injuring Sergeant Rose and the personnel on board.

Despite his numerous wounds from the past three days, Sergeant Rose continued to pull and carry unconscious and wounded personnel out of the burning wreckage and continued to administer aid to the wounded until another extraction helicopter arrived.

Sergeant Rose’s extraordinary heroism and selflessness above and beyond the call of duty were critical to saving numerous lives over that four-day time period. His actions are in keeping with the highest traditions of military service and reflect great credit upon himself, the 1st Special Forces, and the United States Army.

== Awards and decorations ==
During his service, Rose earned many decorations, including:

Combat Medical Badge
Medal of Honor, upgraded from a Distinguished Service Cross on 23 October 2017
Bronze Star Medal w/ "V" device and one bronze oak leaf cluster	Purple Heart w/ 2 bronze oak leaf clusters	Meritorious Service Medal
Air Medal	Army Commendation Medal	Army Good Conduct Medal w/ bronze clasp, 2 loops
National Defense Service Medal	Vietnam Service Medal w/ 3 Service star	Noncommissioned Officer Professional Development Ribbon
Army Service Ribbon	Overseas Service Ribbon w/ bronze numeral "5"	Vietnam Campaign Medal w/ "60-" device
Special Forces Tab	Expert Field Medical Badge	Parachutist Badge
Presidential Unit Citation DAGO 25 for the period 24 Jan 64 – 30 APR 72 dated June 8, 2001, for Studies and Observation Group, Military Assistance Command, Vietnam
Meritorious Unit Commendation DAGO 51,71 for the period 1 Nov 68 – 30 Jun 70 for Studies and Observation Group, United States Military Assistance Command, Vietnam as per Department of the Army Pamphlet 672–3 dated January 29, 1988, pages 99–100	Republic of Vietnam Gallantry Cross Unit Citation The Vietnamese Government issued the award to all units subordinate to Military Assistance Command Vietnam (MACV) during the period 8 February 1962 and 28 March 1973 and to U.S. Army Vietnam (USARV) and its subordinate units for the period 20 July 1965 to 28 March 1973. This permits all personnel who served in Vietnam to wear the RVN Gallantry Cross unit citation.	Republic of Vietnam Civil Actions Medal Unit Citation DAGO 48,71 for the period 30 Apr 68 – 24 Sep 70 for Special Operations Augmentation, Command and Control Center, 5th Special Forces Group, 1st Special Forces as per Department of the Army Pamphlet 672–3 dated January 29, 1988, page 9

- Thai Army Parachutist Badge
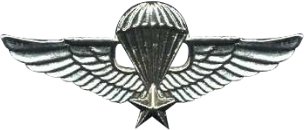
- Republic of Vietnam Parachutist Badge

== See also ==
- Desmond Doss
- Harold A. Garman
- Thomas W. Bennett
- Joseph G. LaPointe Jr.
