= Phan Đức Lễ =

Vietnamese footballer (born 1993)

Personal information
- Full name: Phan Đức Lễ
- Date of birth: 17 October 1993 (age 33)
- Place of birth: Chư Păh, Gia Lai, Vietnam
- Height: 1.77 m (5 ft 10 in)
- Position: Defender

Team information
- Current team: SHB Đà Nẵng
- Number: 39

Youth career
- 2008–2012: SHB Đà Nẵng

Senior career*
Years	Team	Apps	(Gls)
2013–2018	SHB Đà Nẵng	50	(2)
2019	Long An	15	(0)
2020	Bình Định	10	(0)
2021	Hoàng Anh Gia Lai	1	(0)
2022	Quảng Nam	11	(0)
2023–	SHB Đà Nẵng	6	(0)
- * Club domestic league appearances and goals as of 2 October 2018

Phan Đức Lễ (born 17 October 1993) is a Vietnamese footballer who plays as a defender for V.League 1 club SHB Đà Nẵng.

== Honours ==
SHB Đà Nẵng

- V.League 2: 2023–24
