= Terry Benedict =

American film producer

- Born: Terry L. Benedict
- Occupation: Film Producer

Terry Benedict is an American film producer. He is the founder and CEO of The Shae Foundation.

Benedict co-produced Hacksaw Ridge, nominated for six Academy Awards. Hacksaw Ridge is based on Benedict's documentary, The Conscientious Objector; a film about Medal of Honor winner Desmond Doss, who refused to carry a weapon in World War Two. Doss is the first conscientious objector to ever receive a Medal of Honor.

== Personal life ==
Benedict is a graduate of Pepperdine University, where he received a full scholarship. He is a member of the WGAW. Benedict is a Seventh-day Adventist.

== Career ==
=== 1984–2004 ===
Benedict began his career in Hollywood supervising chase scenes, notably for The Terminator and Marked For Death. He has worked with Academy Award-winning cinematographers Conrad Hall and Haskell Wexler to create commercials for Honda, Blue Cross, Nissan and others. He has produced commercials for Japanese brands: Mitsubishi, Seagram's, and TDK Tapes - working with Madonna, Stevie Wonder, and Arnold Schwarzenegger. Terry went on to write and direct the film Painted Hero with Dwight Yoakam and Peter Fonda.

=== 2004–present ===
After Painted Hero, Benedict became the Director of Photography for the documentary, Where I Stand: The Hank Greenspun Story narrated by Academy Award winner Anthony Hopkins and directed by Emmy winner Scott Goldstein. He produced and directed the critically acclaimed and award-winning documentary film, The Conscientious Objector. The film garnered several dozen awards in multiple categories during a two-year run on the international festival circuit including many “audience favorite” awards, a Crystal Heart Award from the Heartland Film Festival and from Boston, a Humanitarian Award. The film played on the International Documentary Association’s InFACT Documentary tour qualifying it for Academy Award consideration. Benedict scripted the first draft of the theatrical narrative project based on the documentary and joined the producing team of Hacksaw Ridge, directed by Mel Gibson.

Benedict has several film projects in development including a new medical drama series and an international series focusing on Hope Extreme. He is also developing the film The Death of Reasonable Doubt, which follows the U.S. Supreme Court death-row case of Troy Davis in Savannah, Georgia.

== Filmography ==
Year	Title	Director	Producer	Writer
1997	Painted Hero	Yes	Yes	Yes
2004	The Conscientious Objector	Yes	Yes	Yes
2016	Hacksaw Ridge	No	Yes	No
TBA	The Death of Reasonable Doubt	Yes	Yes	No

== Humanitarian work ==
Over the last few years, Benedict has spent months filming in India and Nepal focusing on social justice issues - orphans, human trafficking and women’s health issues. He created Hope In Motion; an award winning television broadcast series of shorts for the NGO Asian Aid. In 2010 form SHAE, a 501(c)(3) organization with a mission of “creating message media for global change,” in an effort to make a positive difference in the global community with art and media from a Creator-based perspective. Currently, Terry is filming two documentary feature films about poverty and the sex trafficking business. He endeavors to pursue his art by the words of Dr. Martin Luther King: “If a man hasn’t discovered something worth dying for, he isn’t fit to live.”

== Awards and honors ==
In his documentary work, Benedict has been featured in numerous magazines for his work on the forefront of HD technology development and working hand-in-hand with manufacturers:

- Filmed with Panasonic Varicam® engineering prototypes
- Filmed with Canon & Fujinon HD prototype lenses
- Developed postproduction workflow with Sunset Digital for the HD format
- First filmmaker to shoot a feature-length documentary using the Panasonic Varicam® HD format and transfer it to 35mm film
- Forerunner integrating HD and HDSLR in creative story

=== Nominated ===
- Academy Awards, Best Motion Picture of the Year, for Hacksaw Ridge (2017)
- Golden Globes, Best Motion Picture - Drama, for Hacksaw Ridge (2017)
- Awards Circuit Community Awards, Best Motion Picture, for Hacksaw Ridge (2016)
- Broadcast Film Critics Association Awards, Best Picture, for Hacksaw Ridge (2016)
- OFTA Awards, Best Picture, for Hacksaw Ridge (2017)
- PFCS Awards, Best Picture, for Hacksaw Ridge (2016)
- Satellite Awards, Best Motion Picture, for Hacksaw Ridge (2016)

=== Won ===
- AACTA International Awards, Best Film, for Hacksaw Ridge (2017)
- AFI Awards, Movie of the Year, for Hacksaw Ridge (2017)
- Broadcast Film Critics Association Awards, Best Action Movie, for Hacksaw Ridge (2016)
- Capri Hollywood, Capri Drama Film of the Year Award, for Hacksaw Ridge (2016)
- Heartland Film Festival, Crystal Heart Award, for The Conscientious Objector (2004)
- Long Island International Film Expo, Best Feature Film - 35 mm, for The Conscientious Objector (2005)
- Santa Cruz Film Festival, Audience Award, for The Conscientious Objector (2005)
