= Seventh-day Adventist tertiary student ministry =

The Seventh-day Adventist tertiary student ministry is a group belonging to the Seventh-day Adventist Church which serves on some universities and other tertiary education campuses throughout the world. Some of these are run independently of the official church. Two of these organizations are the Adventist Christian Fellowship of North America and the Adventist Students Association of Australia.

== North America ==
Adventist Christian Fellowship is a collegiate ministry of the North American Division of Seventh-day Adventists. ACF is the name of both the ACF Network, which is run by the Division, and of many individual fellowship groups, which are organized on a local level. The NAD Adventist Christian Fellowship Network was founded in 2005 "to build Christian fellowship chapters on public campuses that honor God and nurture the spiritual lives of students in North America". Adventist Christian Fellowship groups can be found on public university and other tertiary campuses across the United States, Canada, and beyond.

In addition to the NAD Adventist Christian Fellowship Network, the CAMPUS network, a ministry of the Michigan Conference of Seventh-day Adventists, and the Morning Star Christian Fellowship network, a para-church organization, also help to organize Adventist student groups on university and other tertiary campuses. Most CAMPUS and Morning Star groups are also affiliated with the larger ACF Network.

== Oceania ==
The Adventist Students Association (ASA) is the best known Adventist student group in Oceania, and operates primarily in Australia. It runs socials, meetings, Bible studies and outreach. Each year, week-long "Convention" and "Symposium" events are held in Australia. ASA is run by students, with support from the church. Its local chapters include:

Australia:

- Queensland University Seventh-day Adventist Students (QUSDAS) in Brisbane, Queensland
- Sydney Adventist Students Society (SASS) in Sydney, New South Wales
- Newcastle Adventist Students Association (NASA) in Newcastle, New South Wales; website
- Adventist Curtin Tertiary Students (ACTS) at Curtin University of Technology in Perth, Western Australia
- Victorian Adventist Students Association (VicASA) in Melbourne, Victoria
- Adventist Tertiary Students Association (ATSA) in Adelaide, South Australia
- ASASN (Australian Capital Territory)

Other countries:

- New Zealand
- Papua New Guinea Adventist Tertiary Students Association.

It is commonly known as PNGATSA. Under PNGATSA there are several Provincial Groups. Among those is Enga Adventist Students Association (EASA) which is the oldest one, started in 1984. EASA gave birth to PNGATSA in the same year. Thus, EASA is as old as PNGATSA. Others are; the Western Highlands Adventist Students Association which is aimed at ages 12–25, Southern Highlands Adventist Students Association, Simbu Adventist Students Association, Sepik Adventist Students Association. WHASA was formed in 1995, and has a membership of 500 (as of 2010).

PNGATSA also have institutional Adventist Student groups. Few of those are:

1. University of Papua New Guinea Adventist Tertiary Students Association, based in Port Moresby
2. University of Technology Adventist Tertiary Students Association, based in Lae
3. University of Goroka Adventist Tertiary Students Association, based in Goroka
4. Divine Word Adventist Students Tertiary Association, based in Madang
5. Vudal Adventist Tertiary Students Association, based in Kokopo

Further, Provincial groups have conventions in their home provinces. EASA hosts yearly Convention while the others have conventions bi-annually, interchangeably with PNGATSA. PNGATSA is now (in 2017) thirty-three (33) years old. Its Ministry in PNG was recognised by the South Pacific Division in 2005. Further, PNGATSA was recognised by the General Conference of the Seventh-day Adventist Church (SDA GC) in March 2015. In that process a student leader from PNG, Nathan Sapala was invited by the SDA GC to attend the first Public Campus Ministries Summit and Sympossium at the World Church headquarters in Silver Spring, Maryland, USA. In that summit PNGATSA was announced as the biggest Student Ministry in the world with a membership of over twenty thousand (20 000+).

- Adventist Students Association Fiji

Additional Adventist communities of students exist which are not formally organised.

== Other ==
Other organisations and names include the following, some of which overlap with the above regions:

- Adventist Students on Campus - Network of Student Associations in the North England Conference
- Adventist Association of Students
- Advent Christian Fellowship
- Adventist Ministry to College and University Students (AMiCUS), Philippines
- Adventist Student Fellowship (ASF)
- Adventist Student Christian Movement
- Adventist Student Movement
- Adventist Students for Christ
- Campus Advent
- Federación Adventista Universitaria (FADU)(University of Puerto Rico at Mayagüez, Puerto Rico)
- Grupo de Estudantes Adventistas - Universidade de São Paulo (GEA-USP)(University of São Paulo, Brazil)
- Movement of Adventist Students, Philippines
- Sanctuary

== See also ==
- Seventh-day Adventist education
