= Hope International =

Hope International may refer to:

- Hope International (Christian microfinance), a Christian financial aid organization
- Hope International (Seventh-day Adventist), a historic Adventism movement
- Hope International University, located in Fullerton, California
- Hope International FC, a football (soccer) club in St. Vincent and the Grenadines
