= The Conscientious Objector =

2004 documentary film by Terry Benedict

- Poster
- Directed by: Terry Benedict
- Written by: Terry Benedict; Jeff Wood
- Produced by: Terry Benedict
- Starring: Desmond Doss
- Cinematography: Suki Medencevic; Darko Suvak; Francis Kenny
- Edited by: Christopher Cibelli; Sean McCulley; Jeff Wood
- Music by: Bob Christianson
- Production companies: Chaparral West; D'Artagnan Entertainment
- Distributed by: Cinequest
- Release date: 2004
- Running time: 102 minutes
- Language: English

The Conscientious Objector is a 2004 documentary film directed by Terry Benedict about the life of Desmond Doss, a conscientious objector who received the Medal of Honor for his service in World War II. Due to his religious convictions as a Seventh-day Adventist, Doss refused to carry a weapon. He initially faced opposition, persecution, and ridicule from his fellow soldiers, but ultimately won their admiration by demonstrating courage and saving many lives as a combat medic.

In 2016, Hacksaw Ridge, a fictional film directed by Mel Gibson and starring Andrew Garfield as Doss, was released to critical and commercial success, signaling Gibson's welcome-back to Hollywood. Benedict was one of the producers of Hacksaw Ridge, and the film features several excerpts from The Conscientious Objector immediately before the end credits.

== Reception ==
The film has received positive acclaim and has won multiple awards, including:

- Long Island International Film Expo Festival Prize – Best Feature Film
- Santa Cruz Film Festival Audience Award – Best Documentary
- Heartland Film Festival Crystal Heart Award – Best Director
- Cinequest Film Festival Audience Choice Award
- Cinequest Film Festival Director's Award
