= Alternative Service Program =

US program for conscientious objectors

In the United States, the Alternative Service Program is a form of alternative service for conscientious objectors within its Selective Service System.

The Alternative Service Program is intended to encourage those called under Selective Service the option of working to improve national well-being as an alternative to bearing arms. Typical period of service is meant to mirror the duration of conscription, usually 24 months.
