= Desmond Doss =

US soldier and Medal of Honor recipient (1919–2006)

Corporal Desmond Doss
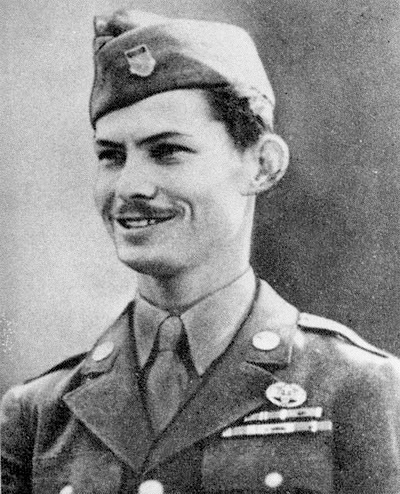
- Doss, photographed prior to receiving the Medal of Honor in October 1945
- Born: Desmond Thomas Doss; February 7, 1919; Lynchburg, Virginia, U.S.
- Died: March 23, 2006 (aged 87); Piedmont, Alabama, U.S.
- Burial place: Chattanooga National Cemetery, Chattanooga, Tennessee
- Spouses: Dorothy Schutte (m. 1942; died 1991); Frances Duman (m. 1993)
- Children: 1
- Military career
- Allegiance: United States
- Branch: United States Army
- Service years: 1942–1946
- Rank: Corporal
- Service number: 33158036
- Units: Company B, 1st Battalion, 307th Infantry Regiment, 77th Infantry Division
- Conflicts: World War II; Pacific War; Battle of Guam; Battle of Leyte; Battle of Okinawa (WIA)
- Awards: Medal of Honor; Bronze Star Medal (2); Purple Heart (3)

Desmond Thomas Doss (February 7, 1919 – March 23, 2006) was a United States Army corporal who served as a combat medic with an infantry company in World War II. Due to his religious beliefs, he refused to carry a weapon.

He was twice awarded the Bronze Star Medal for actions on Guam and in the Philippines. Doss further distinguished himself in the Battle of Okinawa by saving 75 to 100 men, (Note: Although the exact number is unknown, as 55 of the 155 soldiers involved in the action were able to retreat without assistance.,) acting on his own, becoming the first of only three conscientious objectors to receive the Medal of Honor for this and other actions; the other two conscientious objectors being Thomas W. Bennett and Joseph G. LaPointe Jr., who were posthumously awarded the Medal of Honor during the Vietnam War.

His life has been the subject of books, the 2004 documentary The Conscientious Objector, and the 2016 Oscar-winning film Hacksaw Ridge, in which he was portrayed by Andrew Garfield.

== Early life ==
Desmond Thomas Doss was born in Lynchburg, Virginia, to William Thomas Doss (1893–1989), a carpenter, and Bertha Edward Doss (née Oliver) (1899–1983), a homemaker and shoe factory worker. William Doss registered for the draft between 1917 and 1918 in Lynchburg, Virginia, as part of the Selective Service System. His mother raised him as a devout Seventh-day Adventist and instilled Sabbath-keeping, nonviolence, and vegetarianism in his upbringing. He grew up in the Fairview Heights area of Lynchburg, alongside his older sister Audrey and younger brother Harold.

Doss attended the Park Avenue Seventh-day Adventist Church school until the eighth grade, and subsequently found a job at the Lynchburg Lumber Company to support his family during the Great Depression. Before the outbreak of World War II, Doss was employed as a joiner at a shipyard in Newport News, Virginia.

== World War II ==
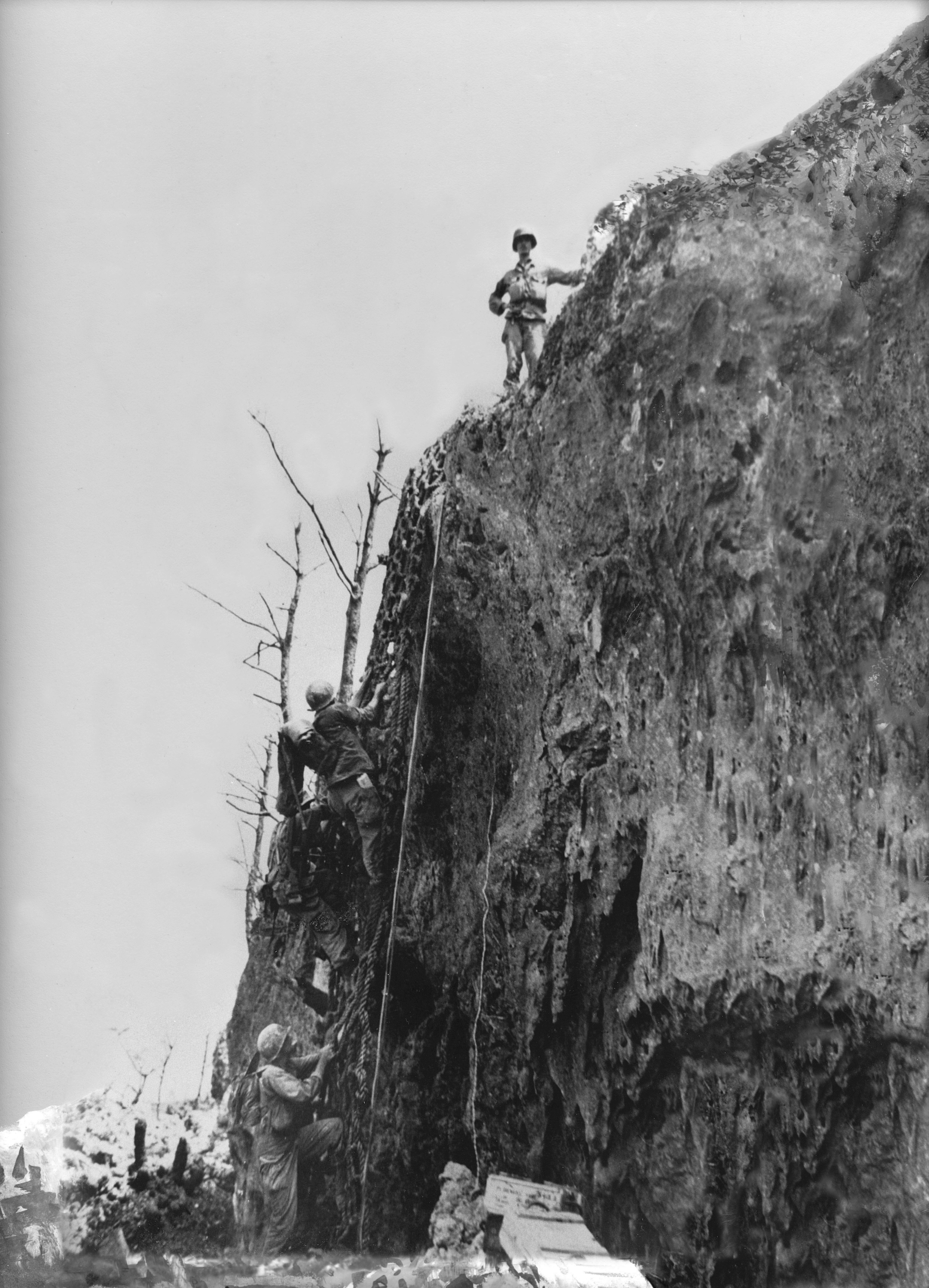
Doss on top of the Maeda Escarpment, May 4, 1945

Despite being offered a draft deferment because of his shipyard work, Doss refused it for patriotic reasons, and was inducted into the Army on April 1, 1942, at Camp Lee, Virginia. He was sent to Fort Jackson, South Carolina, for training with the reactivated 77th Infantry Division. Meanwhile, his brother Harold served aboard the USS Lindsey.

Doss refused to carry a weapon into combat because of his personal beliefs as a Seventh-day Adventist against killing. He consequently became a medic assigned to the 2nd Platoon, Company B, 1st Battalion, 307th Infantry, 77th Infantry Division.

While serving with his platoon in 1944 in Guam and the Philippines, he was awarded two Bronze Star Medals with a "V" device, for exceptional valor in aiding wounded soldiers under fire. During the Battle of Okinawa, he saved the lives of 75–100 wounded infantrymen atop the area known by the 96th Division as the Maeda Escarpment or Hacksaw Ridge. Doss was wounded four times in Okinawa, and was evacuated on May 21, 1945, aboard the USS Mercy. Doss suffered a left arm fracture from a sniper's bullet while being carried back to Allied lines and at one point had 17 pieces of shrapnel embedded in his body after attempting to kick a grenade away from himself and his comrades. He was awarded the Medal of Honor for his actions in Okinawa.

== Post-war life ==
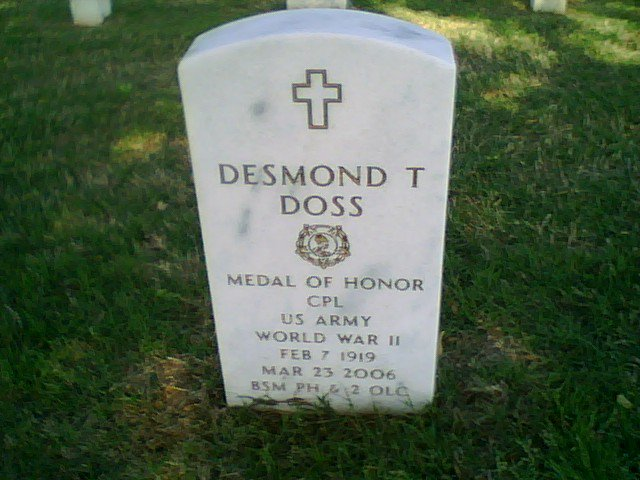
Desmond Doss' grave

After the war, Doss wanted to continue his career in carpentry but extensive damage to his left arm made that impossible. In 1946, he was diagnosed with tuberculosis, contracted on Leyte. He underwent treatment for five and a half years — losing a lung and five ribs — before being discharged from the hospital in August 1951 with 90% disability.

After an overdose of antibiotics rendered him completely deaf in 1976, he was given 100% disability; he was able to regain his hearing after receiving a cochlear implant in 1988. Despite his injuries, he managed to raise a family on a small farm in Rising Fawn, Georgia.

Doss married Dorothy Pauline Schutte on August 17, 1942, and they had one child, Desmond "Tommy" Doss Jr., born in 1946. Desmond, Jr. followed in his father's footsteps, serving as an army medic, then as a firefighter and paramedic. On November 17, 1991, Dorothy died in a car accident that happened while Doss was driving her to the hospital for cancer treatment. Doss remarried on July 1, 1993, to Frances May Duman.

After being hospitalized for difficulty breathing, Doss died on March 23, 2006, at his home in Piedmont, Alabama. He was buried on April 3, 2006, in the Chattanooga National Cemetery, Tennessee. Frances died three years later on February 3, 2009, at the Piedmont Health Care Center in Piedmont, Alabama.

== Awards and decorations ==
=== Medal of Honor ===
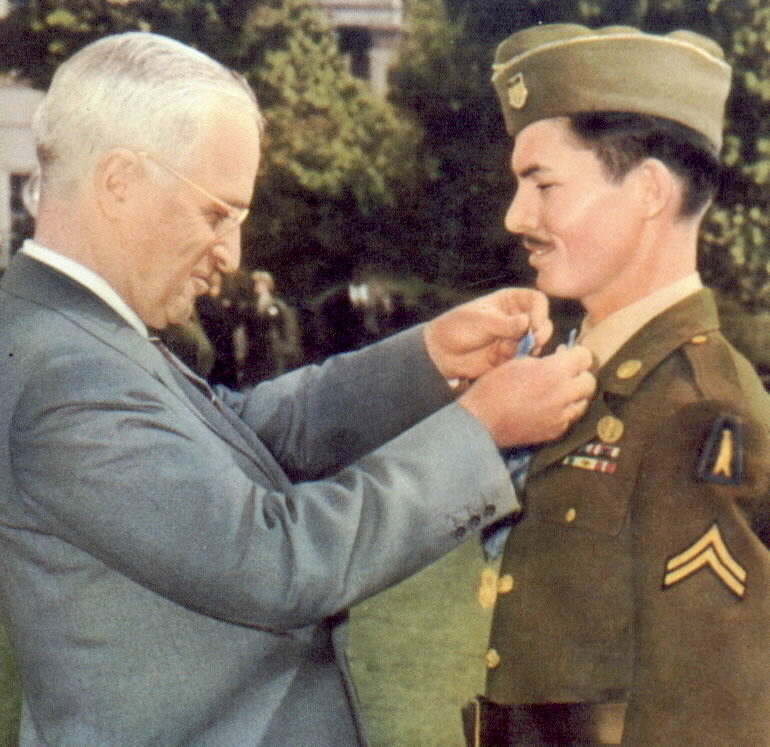
Corporal Doss receiving the Medal of Honor from President Harry S. Truman on October 12, 1945

Medal of Honor

Rank and organization: Private First Class, United States Army, Medical Detachment, 307th Infantry, 77th Infantry Division.

Place and date: Near Urasoe Mura, Okinawa, Ryukyu Islands, April 29, 1945 – May 21, 1945.

Entered service at: Lynchburg, Virginia

Birth: Lynchburg, Virginia

G.O. No.: 97, November 1, 1945.

The President of the United States of America, authorized by Act of Congress, March 3, 1863, has awarded in the name of The Congress the MEDAL OF HONOR to

PRIVATE FIRST CLASS DESMOND T. DOSS
UNITED STATES ARMY

for service as set forth in the following

Citation: Private First Class Desmond T. Doss, United States Army, Medical Detachment, 307th Infantry, 77th Infantry Division. Near Urasoe-Mura, Okinawa, Ryukyu Islands, 29 April – 21 May 1945. He was a company aid man when the 1st Battalion assaulted a jagged escarpment 400 feet high. As our troops gained the summit, a heavy concentration of artillery, mortar and machinegun fire crashed into them, inflicting approximately 75 casualties and driving the others back. Private First Class Doss refused to seek cover and remained in the fire-swept area with the many stricken, carrying them one by one to the edge of the escarpment and there lowering them on a rope-supported litter down the face of a cliff to friendly hands. On 2 May, he exposed himself to heavy rifle and mortar fire in rescuing a wounded man 200 yards forward of the lines on the same escarpment; and two days later he treated four men who had been cut down while assaulting a strongly defended cave, advancing through a shower of grenades to within eight yards of enemy forces in a cave's mouth, where he dressed his comrades' wounds before making four separate trips under fire to evacuate them to safety. On 5 May, he unhesitatingly braved enemy shelling and small arms fire to assist an artillery officer. He applied bandages, moved his patient to a spot that offered protection from small-arms fire and, while artillery and mortar shells fell close by, painstakingly administered plasma. Later that day, when an American was severely wounded by fire from a cave, Private First Class Doss crawled to him where he had fallen 25 feet from the enemy position, rendered aid, and carried him 100 yards to safety while continually exposed to enemy fire. On 21 May, in a night attack on high ground near Shuri, he remained in exposed territory while the rest of his company took cover, fearlessly risking the chance that he would be mistaken for an infiltrating Japanese and giving aid to the injured until he was himself seriously wounded in the legs by the explosion of a grenade. Rather than call another aid man from cover, he cared for his own injuries and waited five hours before litter bearers reached him and started carrying him to cover. The trio was caught in an enemy tank attack and Private First Class Doss, seeing a more critically wounded man nearby, crawled off the litter and directed the bearers to give their first attention to the other man. Awaiting the litter bearers' return, he was again struck, this time suffering a compound fracture of one arm. With magnificent fortitude he bound a rifle stock to his shattered arm as a splint and then crawled 300 yards over rough terrain to the aid station. Through his outstanding bravery and unflinching determination in the face of desperately dangerous conditions Private First Class Doss saved the lives of many soldiers. His name became a symbol throughout the 77th Infantry Division for outstanding gallantry far above and beyond the call of duty.

October 12, 1945
THE WHITE HOUSE

=== Other awards and decorations ===
In addition to his Medal of Honor, he also received a bronze star for valor with one Oak Leaf Cluster (signifying two bronze stars), the Asiatic-Pacific campaign medal with three bronze stars, and beachhead arrowhead (signifying service in 4 combat campaigns including an amphibious landing under combat conditions), and the Good Conduct Medal, as well as the aforementioned Purple Heart with two Oak Leaf clusters (signifying three Purple Hearts).

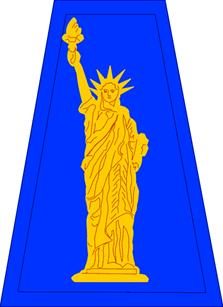

Combat Medical Badge
Medal of Honor		Bronze Star Medal with 1 oak leaf cluster
Purple Heart with 2 oak leaf clusters	Good Conduct Medal	American Campaign Medal
Asiatic–Pacific Campaign Medal with arrowhead device and 3 3/16" bronze stars	World War II Victory Medal	Philippine Liberation Medal with 1 3/16" bronze service star
Army Presidential Unit Citation		Meritorious Unit Commendation
77th Infantry Division SSI

== Other honors and recognition ==
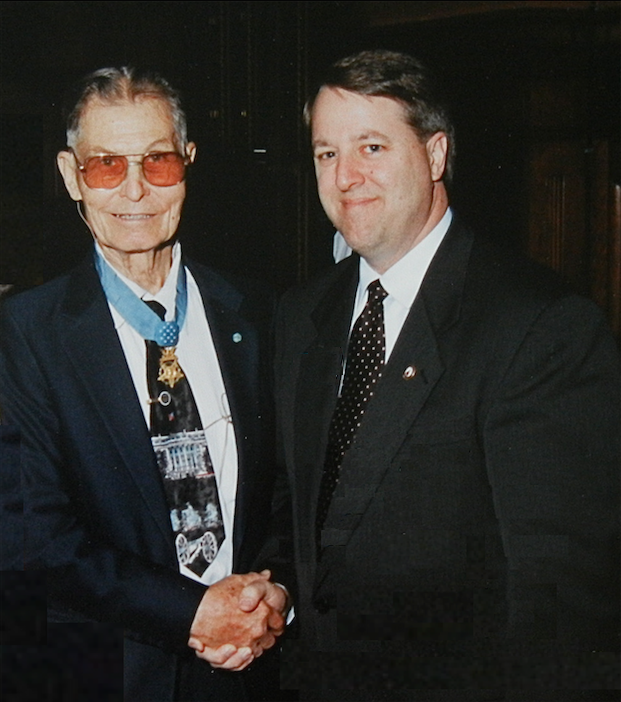
Desmond Doss (left) at the Georgia State Capitol on March 20, 2000, after being presented a special resolution sponsored by state representative Randy Sauder (right)

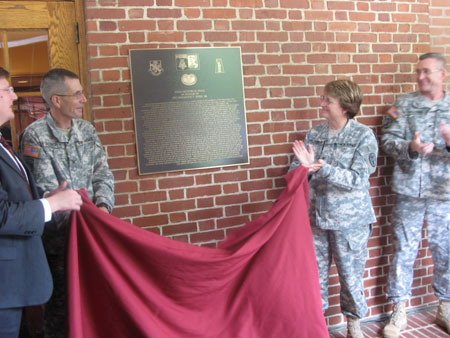
Doss Hall renaming ceremony

- A portion of US Route 501 near Peaks View Park is named "Pfc. Desmond T. Doss Memorial Expressway." Local veterans of the area honor him by decorating the signs marking this portion of road several times during the year, particularly around patriotic holidays.
- In 1951, Camp Desmond T. Doss was Born in Grand Ledge, Michigan, to help train young Seventh-day Adventist men for service in the military. The camp was active throughout the Korean and Vietnam Wars before the property was sold in 1988.
- In the early 1980s, a school in Lynchburg was renamed Desmond T. Doss Christian Academy. The school was founded by the Lynchburg Seventh-day Adventist Church, the home church of Desmond Doss during his years in Lynchburg. The church wanted to honor Doss for standing strong in his faith despite facing great adversity. Doss visited the school that bears his name three times before his death.
- On July 10, 1990, a section of Georgia Highway 2 between US Highway 27 and Georgia Highway 193 in Walker County was named the "Desmond T. Doss Medal of Honor Highway."
- On March 20, 2000, Doss appeared before the Georgia House of Representatives and was presented a special resolution honoring his heroic accomplishments on behalf of the country.
- On July 4, 2004, a statue of Doss was dedicated at the National Museum of Patriotism in Atlanta, Georgia, which remained until the museum's closure in July 2010.
- In May 2007, a statue of Doss was dedicated at Veterans Memorial Park in Collegedale, Tennessee.
- In July 2008, the guest house at Walter Reed Army Medical Center in Washington, D.C., was renamed Doss Memorial Hall.
- On August 30, 2008, a two-mile stretch of Alabama Highway 9 in Piedmont was named the "Desmond T. Doss Sr. Memorial Highway."
- On October 25, 2016, the city of Lynchburg, Virginia, awarded a plaque in his honor to Desmond T. Doss Christian Academy.
- On February 7, 2017, PETA posthumously honored Doss with a Hero to Animals award in recognition of his lifelong commitment to vegetarianism.
- On May 7, 2019, the U.S. Army Health Clinic-Schofield Barracks in Hawaii was renamed the Desmond T. Doss Health Clinic.
- On October 12, 2020, the Lynchburg Virginia Area Veterans Council dedicated a plaque at his former childhood home to commemorate the Desmond T. Doss Veterans Home. The home is Doss's birthplace and is now used as a homeless and displaced veterans shelter.

== In media ==
=== Television and film ===
On February 18, 1959, Doss appeared on the Ralph Edwards NBC TV show This Is Your Life.

Doss is the subject of The Conscientious Objector, a 2004 documentary by Terry Benedict.

The 2016 feature film Hacksaw Ridge, based on his life, was produced by Terry Benedict and directed by Mel Gibson, with Andrew Garfield portraying him. Garfield was nominated for an Academy Award for his performance.

Doss was profiled in a three-part TV series by It Is Written in November 2016.

=== Print ===
Doss is the subject of four biographical books:

- Herndon, Booton (2004). The Unlikeliest Hero: The Story of Desmond T. Doss, Conscientious Objector Who Won His Nation's Highest Military Honor. Mountain View, CA: Pacific Press Publishing Association. ISBN 978-0-8163-2048-6.
- Desmond Doss Conscientious Objector: The Story of an Unlikely Hero (2015) by Frances M. Doss
- Redemption at Hacksaw Ridge: The Gripping True Story That Inspired The Movie (2016) by Booton Herndon
- The Birth of Hacksaw Ridge: How It All Began (2017) by Gregory Crosby and Gene Church

== See also ==
- Bull Allen (soldier), an Australian World War II stretcher bearer awarded the Silver Star
- Noel Godfrey Chavasse and Arthur Martin-Leake, both awarded the Victoria Cross and Bar for their medical work.
- List of Medal of Honor recipients for World War II
- Medical Cadet Corps
