= National Museum of Patriotism =

Museum in Georgia, U.S.

Coordinates: 33.79306°N 84.388795°W

The National Museum of Patriotism was a museum in Atlanta, Georgia, United States. At its peak, the museum occupied a 10,000-square-foot site on Spring Street in Midtown Atlanta.

== History ==
Founded by Nicholas D. Snider, a former vice president of the United Parcel Service, the museum opened to the public at 1405 Spring Street on July 4, 2004, and transferred to 275 Baker Street in the Centennial Olympic Park. Jim Balster was the museum's first executive director, followed by Jim Stapleton and Pat Stansbury.

In April 2009, the Patriotism in Entertainment and Music exhibit was opened in a ceremony attended by Kenny Gamble, Miss USO (Heidi-Marie Ferren), and Patti LaBelle. Simultaneously, the museum inaugurated its Patriot Award, whose recipients included LaBelle and Gamble, Lee Greenwood, Cowboy Crush, The Bob Hope Foundation, and Access Hollywood.

== Closure ==
In July 2010, the physical museum closed, and was rebranded as the "National Foundation Of Patriotism", with an online virtual museum. The museum then auctioned off some of its exhibits and artifacts.
