= Asian Aid =

Christian charity in New South Wales, Australia

Asian Aid is a non-profit Christian charity organisation that works to implement development projects and provide sponsorship of poverty-stricken children from Bangladesh, Indonesia, India, Nepal and Sri Lanka. Founded in 1966, Asian Aid is an accredited, supporting ministry of the Seventh-day Adventist Church. Based out of Wauchope, New South Wales, Australia, Asian Aid is a member of ACFID and a signatory of the ACFID code for non-government organisations and has a minor supporting branch in the United States led by volunteer John Truscott.
