= Thomas W. Bennett (conscientious objector) =

United States Army Medal of Honor recipient (1947–1969)

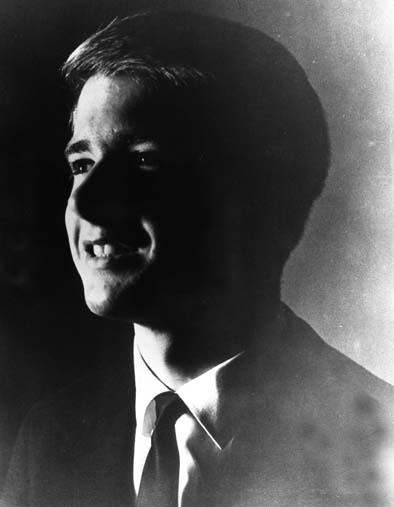
- Corporal Thomas Bennett
- Born: Thomas William Bennett; April 7, 1947; Morgantown, West Virginia, U.S.
- Died: February 11, 1969 (aged 21); Chư Păh District, Pleiku Province, Republic of Vietnam
- Burial place: East Oak Grove Cemetery, Morgantown, West Virginia
- Military career
- Allegiance: United States of America
- Branch: United States Army
- Service years: 1968–1969
- Rank: Corporal
- Units: Company B, 1st Battalion, 14th Infantry Regiment, 4th Infantry Division
- Conflicts: Vietnam War †
- Awards: Medal of Honor; Purple Heart

Thomas William Bennett (April 7, 1947 – February 11, 1969) was a United States Army medic who was killed in action during the Vietnam War and the second conscientious objector to receive the Medal of Honor.

Bennett received the medal after repeatedly putting himself in harm's way to save wounded soldiers during operations in the Central Highlands of Vietnam. He was mortally wounded during one of these actions in Pleiku Province and received the Medal of Honor posthumously.

== Biography ==
Born on April 7, 1947, in Morgantown, West Virginia, Thomas W. Bennett was sociable and deeply religious. He was raised a Southern Baptist, and while a student at West Virginia University, Bennett formed the Campus Ecumenical Council during his freshman year.

When Bennett was placed on academic probation after the fall 1967 semester, he considered his options should he lose his academic deferment. Patriotic but opposed to killing on religious grounds, Bennett opted to enlist as a conscientious objector who was willing to serve. This classification is different from a conscientious objector who will not assist the military in any way. He was trained as a field medic.

Bennett arrived in South Vietnam on January 1, 1969, and was assigned to Bravo Company, 1st Battalion, 14th Infantry in the Central Highlands of Vietnam. The unit began a series of strenuous patrols in the dense, mountainous terrain. On February 9, the unit came under intense fire, and Bennett risked gunfire to pull at least five wounded men to safety. That evening, his platoon sergeant recommended him for the Silver Star. Over the coming days, Bennett repeatedly put himself in harm's way to tend to the wounded. Two days later while attempting to reach a soldier wounded by sniper fire, Bennett was gunned down. On April 7, 1970, his posthumous Medal of Honor was presented to his mother and stepfather by President Richard Nixon.

== Honors ==
In 1988, a center for young people at Schofield Barracks on Oahu, Hawaii, was named for Bennett. A bridge carrying Interstate 79 over the Monongahela River in Morgantown, WV is named in his honor. At West Virginia University's Evansdale Residential Complex, the Bennett Tower residence hall is named after Bennett. A medical clinic at Fort Hood, Texas is named in his honor. Bennett is the subject of Peaceful Patriot: the Story of Tom Bennett by Bonni McKeown.

== Awards and decorations ==
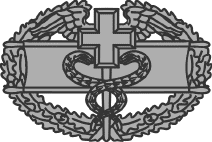

Combat Medical Badge
Medal of Honor	Purple Heart	National Defense Service Medal
Vietnam Service Medal w/ bronze campaign star	Republic of Vietnam Civil Actions Medal; First class	Republic of Vietnam Campaign Medal

Republic of Vietnam Gallantry Cross Unit Citation

=== Medal of Honor citation ===
Rank and organization: Corporal, United States Army, 2nd Platoon, Company B, 1st Battalion, 14th Infantry Regiment.

Place and date: Chu Pah Region, Pleiku Province, Republic of Vietnam, 9–11 February 1969

Entered service at: Fairmont, West Virginia

Birth: Morgantown, West Virginia Born: 7 April 1947

Citation

For conspicuous gallantry and intrepidity in action at the risk of his life above and beyond the call of duty. Cpl. Tom Bennett distinguished himself while serving as a platoon medical aidman with the 2d Platoon, Company B, during a reconnaissance-in-force mission. On 9 February the platoon was moving to assist the 1st Platoon of Company D which had run into a North Vietnamese ambush when it became heavily engaged by the intense small arms, automatic weapons, mortar and rocket fire from a well fortified and numerically superior enemy unit. In the initial barrage of fire, 3 of the point members of the platoon fell wounded. Cpl.Tom Bennett, with complete disregard for his safety, ran through the heavy fire to his fallen comrades, administered life-saving first aid under fire and then made repeated trips carrying the wounded men to positions of relative safety from which they would be medically evacuated from the battle position. Cpl. Tom Bennett repeatedly braved the intense enemy fire moving across open areas to give aid and comfort to his wounded comrades. He valiantly exposed himself to the heavy fire in order to retrieve the bodies of several fallen personnel. Throughout the night and following day, Cpl.Tom Bennett moved from position to position treating and comforting the several personnel who had suffered shrapnel and gunshot wounds. On 11 February, Company B again moved in an assault on the well fortified enemy positions and became heavily engaged with the numerically superior enemy force. Five members of the company fell wounded in the initial assault. Cpl.Tom Bennett ran to their aid without regard to the heavy fire. He treated 1 wounded comrade and began running toward another seriously wounded man. Although the wounded man was located forward of the company position covered by heavy enemy grazing fire and Cpl.Tom Bennett was warned that it was impossible to reach the position, he leaped forward with complete disregard for his safety to save his comrade's life. In attempting to save his fellow soldier, he was mortally wounded. Cpl.Tom Bennett's undaunted concern for his comrades at the cost of his life above and beyond the call of duty are in keeping with the highest traditions of the military service and reflect great credit upon himself, his unit, and the U.S. Army.

== See also ==
- List of Medal of Honor recipients
- List of Medal of Honor recipients for the Vietnam War
- Desmond Doss – first combat medic to receive the Medal of Honor (World War II)
- Harold A. Garman
- Joseph G. LaPointe Jr.
- Gary M. Rose
- Alfred L. Wilson

== Notes ==
- "Medal of Honor recipients". Medal of Honor citations. United States Army Center of Military History. August 3, 2009. Archived from the original on June 27, 2009.
