= Joseph G. LaPointe Jr. =

United States Army Medal of Honor recipient (1948–1969)

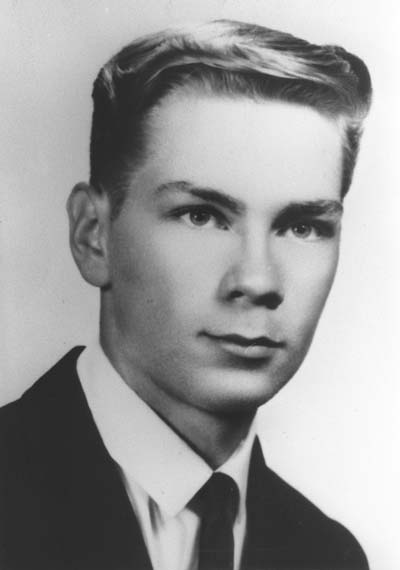
- Specialist Four Joseph LaPointe
- Born: Joseph Guy LaPointe Jr. July 2, 1948; Dayton, Ohio, U.S.
- Died: June 2, 1969 (aged 20); Quảng Tín Province, Republic of Vietnam
- Burial place: Riverside Cemetery, West Milton, Ohio
- Military career
- Allegiance: United States of America
- Branch: United States Army
- Service years: 1968–1969
- Rank: Specialist Four
- Units: HHT, B Troop, 2/17th Cavalry Regiment, 101st Airborne Division
- Conflicts: Vietnam War †
- Awards: Medal of Honor; Silver Star; Bronze Star; Purple Heart

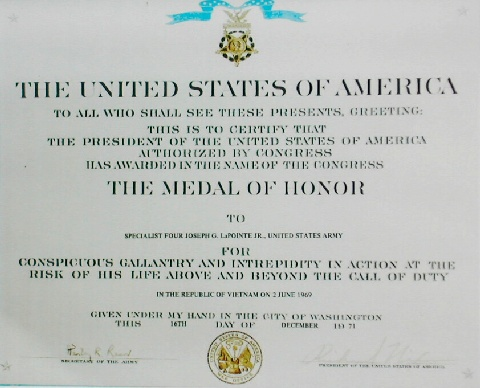
Medal of Honor Certificate

Joseph Guy LaPointe Jr. (July 2, 1948 – June 2, 1969) was a combat medic in the United States Army who posthumously received the Medal of Honor for his actions during the Vietnam War.

== Biography ==
LaPointe, known to his family as "Guy", was born and raised in Dayton, Ohio. After graduating from Northridge High School in 1966, he moved to nearby Clayton and worked as a mail carrier in Englewood. LaPointe was a nature lover and avid hiker.

LaPointe was drafted in 1968 and declared himself a conscientious objector. He married Cindy Failor of Dayton, Ohio at the Englewood First Baptist Church in Ohio, during his training at the Army Medical Training Center, Fort Sam Houston, Texas. He became a combat medic and was sent to Vietnam in November 1968.

By June 2 of the next year, he was a Specialist 4 serving with the 2nd Squadron, 17th Cavalry Regiment, 101st Airborne Division. On that day, he participated in a patrol on Hill 376 in Quảng Tín Province during Operation Lamar Plain. When his unit came under heavy fire from entrenched enemy forces and took several casualties, LaPointe ran through the automatic weapon fire to reach two wounded men at the head of the patrol. He treated the soldiers and shielded them with his body, even after being twice wounded, until they were all killed by an enemy grenade. For these actions, he was posthumously awarded the Medal of Honor in January 1972. His other decorations include the Silver Star, Bronze Star, and National Defense Service Medal.

He left a "widow, Cindy LaPointe Dafler, and son Joseph G. LaPointe III, who never met his father."

== Awards and decorations ==
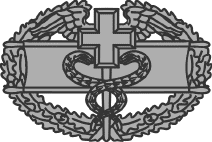

Badge	Combat Medical Badge		
1st Row	Medal of Honor	Silver Star	Bronze Star
2nd Row	Purple Heart	National Defense Service Medal	Vietnam Service Medal

== Medal of Honor citation ==
LaPointe's official Medal of Honor citation reads:

Citation

For conspicuous gallantry and intrepidity in action at the risk of his life above and beyond the call of duty. SPC4. LaPointe, Headquarters and Headquarters Troop, 2d Squadron, distinguished himself while serving as a medical aidman during a combat helicopter assault mission. SPC4. LaPointe's patrol was advancing from the landing zone through an adjoining valley when it suddenly encountered heavy automatic weapons fire from a large enemy force entrenched in well fortified bunker positions. In the initial hail of fire, 2 soldiers in the formation vanguard were seriously wounded. Hearing a call for aid from 1 of the wounded, SPC4. LaPointe ran forward through heavy fire to assist his fallen comrades. To reach the wounded men, he was forced to crawl directly in view of an enemy bunker. As members of his unit attempted to provide covering fire, he administered first aid to 1 man, shielding the other with his body. He was hit by a burst of fire from the bunker while attending the wounded soldier. In spite of his painful wounds, SPC4. LaPointe continued his lifesaving duties until he was again wounded and knocked to the ground. Making strenuous efforts, he moved back again into a shielding position to continue administering first aid. An exploding enemy grenade mortally wounded all 3 men. SPC4. LaPointe's courageous actions at the cost of his life were an inspiration to his comrades. His gallantry and selflessness are in the highest traditions of the military service and reflect great credit on him, his unit, and the U.S. Army.

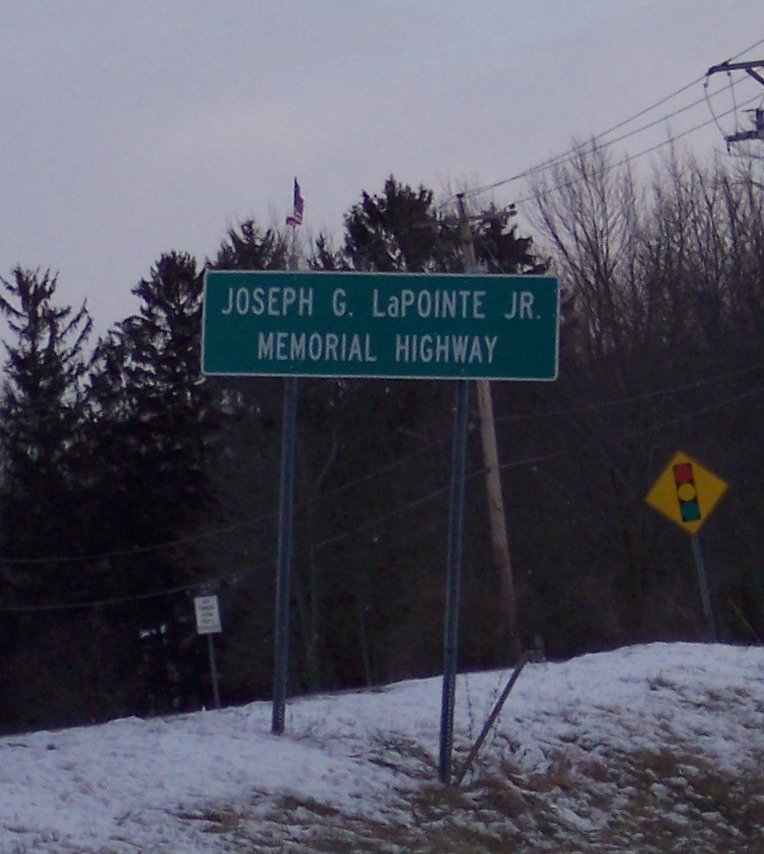
Memorial highway named for LaPointe

== Honors ==
Several structures have been named in LaPointe's honor:

- Housing complex and medical complex in Fort Campbell, Kentucky
- Medical heliport in Fort Moore, Georgia
- Army Reserve Center in Riverside, Ohio. On June 2, 2009, the 40th anniversary of his death, LaPointe's widow and son were presented with the Medal of Honor flag during a ceremony at the LaPointe Army Reserve Center in Riverside.
- A portion of Ohio State Route 49 in Montgomery County has been designated the "Joseph G. LaPointe Jr. Memorial Highway".

== See also ==
- List of Medal of Honor recipients for the Vietnam War
- Desmond Doss
- Harold A. Garman
- Thomas W. Bennett
- Gary M. Rose
