= Chư Păh district =

Coordinates: 14.167°N 107.833°E

Chư Păh district Huyện Chư Păh
- District
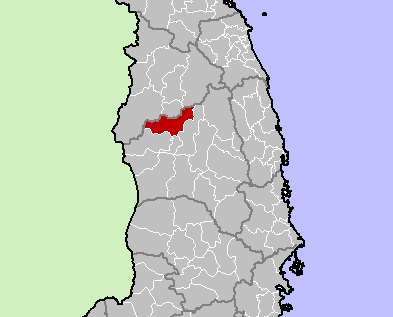
- Location in Gia Lai province
- Country: Vietnam
- Region: Central Highlands
- Province: Gia Lai province
- Capital: Phú Hòa

Area
  - Total: 377.66 sq mi (978.14 km^{2})

Population (31/12/2024)
  - Total: 173,769
  - Density: 460.12/sq mi (177.65/km^{2})
- Time zone: UTC+7 (Indochina Time)

Chư Păh is a former rural district of Gia Lai province in the Central Highlands region of Vietnam covering an area of 981 km^{2}. The district capital lies at Phú Hòa and, as of 2003, had a population of 62,672.
