= List of awards and nominations received by Mel Gibson =

Mel Gibson awards and nominations
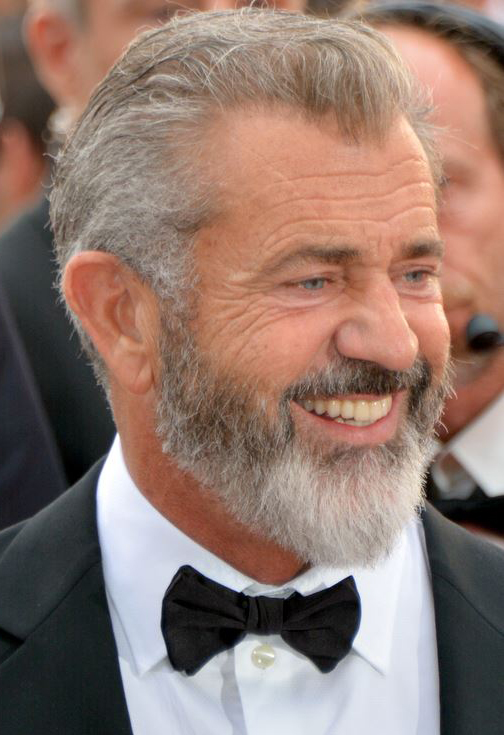
- Gibson at the 2016 Cannes Film Festival
Awards and nominations
Award	Wins	Nominations
Golden Globe	1	4
Academy Awards	2	3
BAFTA Awards	0	2

This is a list of awards and nominations received by actor and filmmaker Mel Gibson. Gibson became known as an action hero, for roles such as Martin Riggs in the Lethal Weapon buddy cop film series, and Max Rockatansky in the first three films in the Mad Max post-apocalyptic action series. He produced, directed, and starred in the epic historical drama film Braveheart, for which he won the Golden Globe Award and Academy Award for Best Director, along with the Academy Award for Best Picture. He later directed and produced The Passion of the Christ, which divided critics but did well at the box office. He received further critical notice for his directorial work of the action-adventure film Apocalypto, which is set in Mesoamerica during the early 16th century. After a 10-year hiatus from directing, Gibson returned with the critically praised and financially successful Hacksaw Ridge, which won the Academy Awards for Best Sound Mixing and Best Film Editing and earned Gibson his second nomination for Best Director.

== Major associations ==
=== Academy Awards ===
The Academy Awards, or "Oscars" are a set of awards given annually for excellence of cinematic achievements. The awards, organized by the Academy of Motion Picture Arts and Sciences (AMPAS), were first held in 1929 at the Hollywood Roosevelt Hotel. Gibson has received two awards from three nominations.

Year	Nominated work	Category	Result
1996	Braveheart	Best Picture	Won
1996	Braveheart	Best Director	Won
2017	Hacksaw Ridge	Best Director	Nominated

=== British Academy Film Awards ===
The British Academy Film Award is an annual award show presented by the British Academy of Film and Television Arts. The awards were founded in 1947 as The British Film Academy, by David Lean, Alexander Korda, Carol Reed, Charles Laughton, Roger Manvell and others. Gibson has received two nominations.

Year	Nominated work	Category	Result
1996	Braveheart	Best Director	Nominated
2007	Apocalypto	Best Film Not in the English Language	Nominated

=== Directors Guild Awards ===
The Directors Guild of America (DGA) is an entertainment guild which represents the interests of film and television directors in the United States motion picture industry and abroad. Founded as the Screen Directors Guild in 1936, the group merged with the Radio and Television Directors Guild in 1960 to become the modern Directors Guild of America. Gibson has received one nomination.

Year	Nominated work	Category	Result
1996	Braveheart	Outstanding Directing – Feature Film	Nominated

=== Golden Globe Awards ===
The Golden Globe Award is an accolade bestowed by the 93 members of the Hollywood Foreign Press Association (HFPA) recognizing excellence in film and television, both domestic and foreign. Gibson has won once in four nominations.

Year	Nominated work	Category	Result
1996	Braveheart	Best Director	Won
1997	Ransom	Best Actor – Motion Picture Drama	Nominated
2001	What Women Want	Best Actor – Motion Picture Musical or Comedy	Nominated
2017	Hacksaw Ridge	Best Director	Nominated

== Other awards and nominations ==
=== Australian Film Critics Association ===
Year	Nominated work	Category	Result
2017	Hacksaw Ridge	Best Director	Nominated

=== Australian Film Institute / AACTA Awards ===
Year	Nominated work	Category	Result
1979	Tim	Best Actor in a Leading Role	Won
1981	Gallipoli	Best Actor in a Leading Role	Won
1982	The Year of Living Dangerously	Best Actor in a Leading Role	Nominated
2002	—N/a	Global Achievement Award	Won
2016	Hacksaw Ridge	Best Direction	Won
2017	Hacksaw Ridge	Best International Direction	Won

=== Blockbuster Entertainment Awards ===
Year	Nominated work	Category	Result
1997	Ransom	Favorite Actor - Suspense	Won
1998	Conspiracy Theory	Favorite Actor - Suspense	Won
1999	Lethal Weapon 4	Favorite Duo - Action/Adventure	Nominated
2000	Payback	Favorite Actor - Action	Nominated
2001	The Patriot	Favorite Actor - Drama	Won
2001	What Women Want	Favorite Actor - Comedy/Romance	Nominated

=== Capri Hollywood International Film Festival ===
Year	Nominated work	Category	Result
2004	The Passion of the Christ	Best Picture	Won

=== Critic's Choice Awards ===
The Critics' Choice Movie Awards have been presented annually since 1995 by the Broadcast Film Critics Association for outstanding achievements in the film industry. Gibson has received one award from two nominations.

Year	Nominated work	Category	Result
1996	Braveheart	Best Director	Won
2016	Hacksaw Ridge	Best Director	Nominated

=== Fangoria Chainsaw Awards ===
Year	Nominated work	Category	Result
2003	Signs	Best Actor	Nominated

=== Film Critics Circle of Australia ===
Year	Nominated work	Category	Result
2017	Hacksaw Ridge	Best Director	Nominated

=== Golden Raspberry Awards ===
Year	Nominated work	Category	Result
2015	The Expendables 3	Worst Supporting Actor	Nominated
2017	Hacksaw Ridge	Razzie Redeemer Award	Won
2018	Daddy's Home 2	Worst Supporting Actor	Won
2022	Dangerous	Worst Supporting Actor	Nominated
2024	Confidential Informant	Worst Supporting Actor	Nominated

=== Karlovy Vary International Film Festival ===
Year	Nominated work	Category	Result
2014	—N/a	Special Prize for Outstanding Contribution to World Cinema	Won

=== Hollywood Film Awards ===
Year	Nominated work	Category	Result
2004	The Passion of the Christ	Producer of the Year	Won
2016	Hacksaw Ridge	Producer of the Year	Won

=== Irish Film & Television Academy ===
Year	Nominated work	Category	Result
2008	—N/a	Outstanding Contribution to World Cinema	Won

=== Jupiter Awards ===
Year	Nominated work	Category	Result
1996	Braveheart	Best International Director	Won

=== MTV Movie & TV Awards ===
Year	Nominated work	Category	Result
1993	Lethal Weapon 3	Best On-Screen Duo	Won
1993	Lethal Weapon 3	Best Action Sequence	Won
1993	Lethal Weapon 3	Most Desirable Male	Nominated
1993	Lethal Weapon 3	Best Kiss	Nominated
1996	Braveheart	Best Male Performance	Nominated
1996	Braveheart	Most Desirable Male	Nominated
1999	Lethal Weapon 4	Best Action Sequence	Nominated
2001	The Patriot	Best Male Performance	Nominated

=== National Board of Review ===
Year	Nominated work	Category	Result
1995	Braveheart	Special Filmmaking Achievement	Won

=== Kids' Choice Awards ===
Year	Nominated work	Category	Result
2001	Chicken Run	Favorite Voice from an Animated Movie	Nominated

=== North Texas Film Critics Association ===
Year	Nominated work	Category	Result
2017	Hacksaw Ridge	Best Director	3rd Place

=== People's Choice Awards ===
Year	Nominated work	Category	Result
1991	—N/a	Favorite Motion Picture Actor	Won
1997	—N/a	Favorite Motion Picture Actor	Won
2001	—N/a	Favorite Motion Picture Star in a Drama	Won
2001	—N/a	Favorite Motion Picture Actor	Won
2003	—N/a	Favorite Motion Picture Actor	Won
2004	—N/a	Favorite Motion Picture Actor	Won

=== Phoenix Film Critics Society ===
Year	Nominated work	Category	Result
2016	Hacksaw Ridge	Best Director	Nominated

=== Satellite Awards ===
Year	Nominated work	Category	Result
2005	The Passion of the Christ	Best Director	Won
2017	Hacksaw Ridge	Best Director	Nominated

=== Saturn Awards ===
The Saturn Awards are presented annually by the Academy of Science Fiction, Fantasy and Horror Films to honor science fiction, fantasy, and horror films, television and home video. Gibson has received three nominations.

Year	Nominated work	Category	Result
1983	Mad Max 2: The Road Warrior	Best Actor	Nominated
2007	Apocalypto	Best Director	Nominated
2019	Dragged Across Concrete	Best Actor	Nominated

=== Others ===
- ShoWest Award: Male Star of the Year (1993)
- ShoWest Award: Director of the Year (1996)
- American Cinematheque Gala Tribute: American Cinematheque Award (1995)
- Hasty Pudding Theatricals: Man of the Year (1997)
- Outstanding Contribution to World Cinema Award at the Irish Film and Television Awards (2008)
