= Father Stu =

2022 American film by Rosalind Ross

- Theatrical release poster
- Directed by: Rosalind Ross
- Written by: Rosalind Ross
- Produced by: Mark Wahlberg; Stephen Levinson; Jordan Foss
- Starring: Mark Wahlberg; Mel Gibson; Jacki Weaver
- Cinematography: Jacques Jouffret
- Edited by: Jeffrey M. Werner
- Music by: Dickon Hinchliffe
- Production companies: Columbia Pictures; Municipal Pictures; CJ Entertainment
- Distributed by: Sony Pictures Releasing
- Release dates: April 5, 2022 (Cinemark Helena); April 13, 2022 (United States)
- Running time: 125 minutes
- Countries: United States; South Korea
- Language: English
- Budget: $4 million
- Box office: $21.8 million

Father Stu is a 2022 biographical drama film starring Mark Wahlberg as Stuart Long, a boxer-turned-Catholic priest who lives with a progressive muscle disorder. The film is written and directed by Rosalind Ross in her directorial debut. The film was produced on a budget of $4 million.

Sony Pictures Releasing released Father Stu in theaters in the United States on April 13, 2022, during the Christian Holy Week. The film received mixed reviews from critics. It grossed $21.8 million worldwide.

The film was re-released on December 9, 2022, as Father Stu: Reborn in a re-cut intended for wider audiences.

== Plot ==
Stuart Long, a foul-mouthed amateur boxer from Helena, Montana, has a troubled relationship with his parents, who have been hostile towards religion since his brother's death. He moves to Southern California to pursue an acting career and gets a job in a grocery store, hoping to get connected in the entertainment industry. He is arrested for a DUI and attempts to steal his father's truck to make it to an audition.

While working in the store, Stu meets a woman named Carmen whom he tracks to a local Catholic parish where she teaches Sunday school. She resists his advances, telling him she would not even consider dating him unless he gets baptized. Stu agrees and begins RCIA at the parish, where he befriends fellow parishioners Ham and Jacob but is looked down upon by the latter. Both Ham and Jacob are headed for the seminary. After Stu is baptized, he and Carmen begin dating and he later meets her parents.

After Stu lands an acting role in an infomercial, he faces discouragement and returns to the bar one night where a mysterious man advises him not to drive home. Stu ignores the advice and drives drunk on his motorcycle. Crashing into a car, he's thrown off the motorcycle, and run over by another car.

Severely injured, he drifts in and out of consciousness and has a vision of the Virgin Mary, who tells him that he cannot die in vain. Stu is transported to the hospital and makes a miraculous recovery. His father visits and re-establishes contact, though their relationship is still strained.

Carmen visits Stu as he is recovering at home and they have an intimate physical moment that appears to lead to sex, but it is revealed later that Carmen used the moment to show Stu that he could resist the temptation. He feels a calling towards priesthood more than marriage, and after prayer and discernment decides to pursue the seminary. His parents and Carmen try to dissuade him, to no avail.

Stu applies to the seminary and is rejected at first, but he appeals the decision and is accepted. By this point, Ham and Jacob are also in the seminary. Ham is a reliable friend; Jacob is something of a rival.

One day while playing basketball, Stu falls and is unable to get up on his own. He is diagnosed with inclusion body myositis, a rare muscular disease similar to Lou Gehrig's disease, and the prognosis is grim. Stu is angry with God but decides his suffering is a gift that draws him closer to Christ's suffering, and he continues in the seminary with difficulty. Carmen, now engaged to another man, visits Stu and supports his vocation.

As time passes, Stu begins losing the use of his hands. The rector tells Stu that he cannot be ordained, citing his inability to celebrate the Sacraments. He moves back to Montana with his parents, who care for him as his muscles decay, his weight increases, and he loses the ability to live independently. His father, meanwhile, attends Alcoholics Anonymous, where he admits that he feels partly responsible for his son's condition by his neglect and absence.

Parishioners from Stu and Carmen's church in California petition the Diocese of Helena to ordain him. The bishop agrees, and Stu is ordained with Carmen, Ham, and his parents in attendance. He begins ministry in Montana and quickly develops relationships with people. Stu is later confined to a skilled nursing facility, where he continues his ministry and people flock to see him daily.

Jacob visits him during confession and admits that he never felt capable of becoming a priest and only pursued it to please his father. Stu assures him that there are other ways to serve God and he should not feel pressured to do something he isn't called to do. Jacob thanks him, saying his goodbyes as he senses it will be the last time. Stu dies at the age of 50. The closing credits show photos of the real-life Stu as a child, young adult, seminarian and priest.

== Cast ==
- Mark Wahlberg as Father Stuart "Stu" Long
- Jacki Weaver as Kathleen Long, Stu's mother
- Mel Gibson as William "Bill" Long, Stu's estranged father
- Teresa Ruiz as Carmen
- Aaron Moten as Ham
- Cody Fern as Jacob
- Carlos Leal as Father Garcia
- Malcolm McDowell as Monsignor Kelly
- Jack Kehler as Curtis
- Niko Nicotera as Barfly
- Annet Mahendru as Virgin Mary
- Tony Amendola as Coach Beech
- Patricia Belcher as Maude
- Colleen Camp as Motel Receptionist
- Winter Ave Zoli as Allison
- De'Aundre Bonds as Gerald
- Michael Fairman as Randall
- Ronnie Gene Blevins as Joe
- Ned Bellamy as Dr. Novak

== Production ==
The film was first publicly announced in 2016, when Wahlberg revealed that he was working on a biopic about Long with screenwriter David O. Russell. Wahlberg first heard about Long's story while out to dinner with two priests. Wahlberg put "millions and millions of dollars" of his own money into the project, mostly due to the shoot going over schedule and the rights to music. Ross wrote the script, then signed on as director in her directorial debut.

Long's parents, Bill and Kathleen, were involved with the production, as were numerous bishops, priests, and laymen who knew Father Stu. Members of the Long family said the portrayal of Bill was overly dramatized, as he always provided for the family and was a loving father. Bill Long still supported the film, saying, "I don't think it matters how I was portrayed, the film is about Fr. Stu. He wants people to come away from the movie with the message to: 'Have faith, hang in there, endure.' "

The film was shot in Los Angeles, California, in just 30 days in May 2021. In late September 2021, some scenes were shot in Montana, in and around Helena, Anaconda, Butte and Phillipsburg. Wahlberg intentionally gained 30 pounds (14 kg) in six weeks to portray Long, consuming up to 7,000 calories a day.

The film contains unusually strong language for a faith-based film, and Wahlberg said he was initially prevented from shooting a scene in a church because it contained vulgar language. Wahlberg defended the use of language as a way of contrasting Long's pre- and post-conversion lifestyles, and the film was commended by many Catholic leaders, including Bishop George Leo Thomas, who ordained Father Stu, Bishop Austin Vetter, the contemporary bishop of Helena, and Bishop Robert Barron.

== Release ==
Wahlberg attended an advance screening of the film at Carroll College in Helena, from which Father Stu graduated and where he later served as a campus minister. The film had its world premiere at the Cinemark Theaters in Helena, Montana, on April 5, 2022.

The film was released in theaters on Wednesday, April 13, 2022, the week before Easter Sunday. It was originally set to be released on Friday, April 15, 2022.

The film was added to Netflix in the United States on September 16, 2022, as part of Sony's Pay-1 window exclusivity deal.

A PG-13 version of the film titled Father Stu: Reborn was released to theaters on December 9, 2022.

== Reception ==
=== Box office ===
In the United States and Canada, Father Stu was projected to gross around $7 million from 2,705 theaters over its five-day opening weekend. The film made $2.3 million in its first two days, and went on to debut to $5.4 million in its opening weekend and $7.7 million over the five days, finishing fifth at the box office. In its second weekend, Father Stu declined 38% to eighth place and grossed $3.3 million. It made $2.2 million in its third weekend, and $875,091 in its fourth, before dropping out of the box office top ten in its fifth weekend with $422,143. It grossed a total of $21.8 million.

=== Critical response ===
On review aggregator Rotten Tomatoes, the film has an approval rating of 42% based on 125 reviews, with an average rating of 5.2/10. The website's critics consensus reads: "Mark Wahlberg is hard-working but miscast in Father Stu, an issue compounded by the way the movie fumbles its fact-based story." Metacritic gave the film a weighted average score of 40 out of 100 based on 27 critics, indicating "mixed or average" reviews. Audiences polled by CinemaScore gave the film an average grade of "A" on an A+ to F scale, while those at PostTrak gave it a 91% positive score, with 76% saying they would definitely recommend it.

Writing for the Chicago Sun-Times, Richard Roeper gave the film three stars out of four, saying: "Father Stu breaks no new ground in the biopic game, but it's a solid and worthy tribute to the real-life Father Stu, who continued to do the Lord's work until his death in 2014 at the age of 50." Owen Gleiberman of Variety wrote: "Father Stu is not your everyday Hollywood religious odyssey – it's closer to Diary of a Country Cutup. It's a surprisingly sincere movie about religious feeling, but it is also, too often, a dramatically undernourished one."

=== Awards ===
Mark Wahlberg was nominated for a Satellite Award for Best Actor in a Motion Picture, Drama for his performance in the film. The re-cut version of the film received nominations for Best Mature Audience Movie, Epiphany Prize Movies, and Grace Award Movie at the Movieguide Awards.
