= Angels at Risk =

US non-profit organization

- Founded: 1997
- Founders: Susie Spain; Ted Danson; Mary Steenburgen; Jesse Sisgold; Tom Nolan; Amanda Shumow

Angels at Risk is a 501(c)(3) non-profit charitable organization in Los Angeles, California, United States, founded by Susie Spain, Ted Danson, Mary Steenburgen, Jesse Sisgold and Tom Nolan that focuses on the issue of drug and alcohol use and abuse in kids, teens, and families through their prevention education programs, services, trainings, and curriculum.

== History ==
Angels at Risk formally became their own 501(c)(3) in 2007, having been a program of both Paul Cummin’s New Visions Foundation and Robyn and Mel Gibson’s Malibu Foundation for Youth & Families prior to 2007. In 1998, then Assemblywoman Sheila Kuehl attended a summit for all of the schools in West Los Angeles. This meeting highlighted the drug and alcohol crisis for teenagers in their community. Several high schools were in attendance including: Santa Monica High, Palisades Charter High, Venice High, Malibu High and Crossroads High. Since that time, Angels at Risk has served the school communities mentioned above and their programs and services have been consistently active on the Westside of Los Angeles from Inglewood to Malibu honoring Angels at Risk’s two main concepts; unity and family.
