= Rosalind Ross (writer) =

American screenwriter, film director and equestrian

Rosalind Ruth Ross (born July 5, 1990) is an American screenwriter, film director and former equestrian vaulter. She is best known for writing, directing and executive producing the 2022 feature film Father Stu.

She won a gold medal at the 2010 FEI World Equestrian Games.

She has also written an episode of the 2014 television series Matador.

She was born in Aptos, California. She graduated from Palo Alto High School and Emerson College.

Ross was in a relationship with Mel Gibson; they have a son named Lars Gerard Gibson, who was born in January 2017. She is a Christian. Ross and Gibson separated in 2025.

In May 2025, it was announced that Ross will make her second directorial effort with God of the Rodeo. Ross will also be credited as writer.
