= Confidential Informant (film) =

- Directed by: Michael Oblowitz
- Written by: Michael Oblowitz; Michael Kaycheck; Brooke Nasser
- Produced by: Daniel Cummings; Eric Rebalkin; Michelle O’Reilly; Sean Patrick O’Reilly; Michael Oblowitz; Dave Fleming
- Starring: Dominic Purcell; Kate Bosworth; Mel Gibson
- Cinematography: Christopher Squires
- Edited by: Jeff Katz; Robert A. Ferretti
- Music by: Roy Hay; DJ Muggs
- Distributed by: Lionsgate
- Release date: June 27, 2023
- Running time: 88 minutes
- Country: United States
- Language: English

Confidential Informant is a 2023 American thriller film written by Michael Oblowitz, Michael Kaycheck and Brooke Nasser, directed by Oblowitz and starring Dominic Purcell, Kate Bosworth and Mel Gibson.

== Cast ==
- Mel Gibson as Kevin Hickey
- Kate Bosworth as Anna Moran
- Dominic Purcell as Tom Moran
- Nick Stahl as Mike Thorton
- Meadow Williams as Jenny Sullivan
- Arielle Raycene as Ginger
- Erik Valdez as Carlos
- Russell Richardson as William Learner
- Joe Mangano as Jon Lindstorm

== Production ==
In July 2022, it was announced that the film was in production and that Purcell, Stahl, Bosworth and Gibson were all cast.

== Release ==
The film was released on digital and on demand on June 27, 2023 and in theaters on June 30, 2023.

== Reception ==
On the review aggregator website Rotten Tomatoes, 0% of 11 critics' reviews are positive, with an average rating of 3.1/10.

Noel Murray of the Los Angeles Times gave the film a negative review and wrote, "It has the shape of a movie, but none of the stuff to make it move."

Julian Roman of MovieWeb also gave the film a negative review and wrote, "The film doesn't craft a compelling narrative to support its cause. Shoddy camera work, murky lighting, and a grating score hinder what could have been impactful. A puzzling climax also makes little sense after a long build up."

Sergio Pereira of Comic Book Resources also gave the film a negative review and wrote, "Despite the cast's best efforts and the noir gloss on display, Confidential Informant surrenders to lackluster editing, flawed logic, and the clichés."

=== Accolades ===
At the 44th Golden Raspberry Awards, the film was nominated for Worst Supporting Actor for Mel Gibson.
