= Mel Gibson =

American actor and filmmaker (born 1956)

Mel Gibson AO
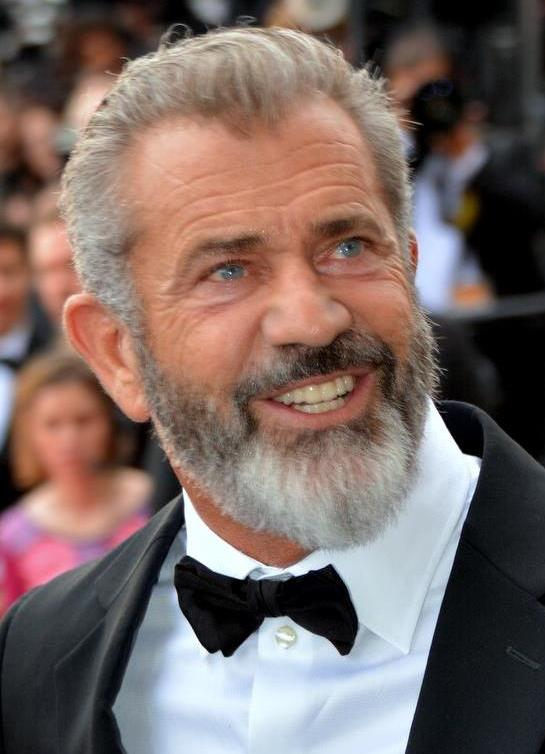
- Gibson in 2016

Special Ambassador to Hollywood
- Incumbent
- Assumed office January 20, 2025 Serving with Jon Voight
- President: Donald Trump
- Preceded by: Position established

Personal details
- Born: Mel Colm-Cille Gerard Gibson; January 3, 1956 (age 70) Peekskill, New York, U.S.
- Citizenship: United States; Ireland
- Party: Republican
- Spouse: Robyn Moore (m. 1980; div. 2011)
- Domestic partner(s): Oksana Grigorieva (2007–2010); Rosalind Ross (2014–2025)
- Children: 9, including Milo
- Parent: Hutton Gibson (father)
- Relatives: Donal Gibson (brother); Eva Mylott (grandmother)
- Education: National Institute of Dramatic Art (BFA)
- Occupation: Actor; film director; producer; screenwriter
- Awards: Full list
- Works: Full list
- Years active: 1976–present

Mel Colm-Cille Gerard Gibson (born January 3, 1956) is an American actor and filmmaker. The recipient of multiple accolades, he is known for directing historical films as well for his action hero roles, particularly his breakout role as Max Rockatansky in the first three films of the post-apocalyptic series Mad Max (1979–1985) and as Martin Riggs in the buddy cop series Lethal Weapon (1987–1998).

Born in Peekskill, New York, Gibson moved with his parents to Sydney, Australia, when he was 12 years old. He studied acting at the National Institute of Dramatic Art, where he starred opposite Judy Davis in a production of Romeo and Juliet. During the 1980s, he founded Icon Entertainment, a production company. Director Peter Weir cast him as one of the leads in the World War I drama Gallipoli (1981), which earned Gibson a Best Actor Award from the Australian Film Institute.

In 1995, Gibson produced, directed, and starred in the war film Braveheart for which he won the Golden Globe Award for Best Director, the Academy Award for Best Director, and the Academy Award for Best Picture. He later directed and produced The Passion of the Christ (2004), a biblical drama that was both financially successful and highly controversial. He received further critical notice for directing the action-adventure film Apocalypto (2006), set in Mesoamerica during the early 16th century. His notable acting roles during this period were in Ransom (1996), Payback (1999), What Women Want, The Patriot (both 2000), and Signs (2002).

After several legal issues, allegations of marital violence and hateful statements became public, Gibson's popularity in Hollywood declined, affecting his career. He subsequently starred in Edge of Darkness (2010) and Jodie Foster's The Beaver (2011). His directorial comeback after an absence of 10 years, Hacksaw Ridge (2016), won two Academy Awards.

== Early life ==
Mel Colm-Cille Gerard Gibson was born on January 3, 1956, in Peekskill, New York. His family is of Irish American descent, as the sixth of 11 children, and the second son of Hutton Gibson, a writer, and Irish-born Anne Patricia (née Reilly, died 1990). Gibson's paternal grandmother was opera contralto Eva Mylott (1875–1920), who was born in Australia to Irish parents, while his paternal grandfather, John Hutton Gibson, was a millionaire tobacco businessman from the Southern United States. One of Gibson's younger brothers, Donal, is also an actor. Gibson's first name is derived from St Mel's Cathedral, situated in his mother's hometown of Longford. His second name, Colmcille, is also shared with an Irish saint.

Gibson's father was awarded US$145,000 in a work-related-injury lawsuit against the New York Central Railroad on February 14, 1968 (equivalent to $1,342,464 in 2025), and soon afterwards relocated his family to West Pymble, New South Wales, Australia. Gibson was 12 years old at the time. The move to his grandmother's native Australia was both financial and a way to avoid the draft of his eldest brother during the Vietnam War.

During his high school years, Gibson was educated by members of the Congregation of Christian Brothers at St Leo's Catholic College in Wahroonga, New South Wales.

== Career ==
=== Overview ===
Gibson gained favorable notices from film critics when he first entered the cinematic scene, as well as comparisons to several classic movie stars. In 1982, Vincent Canby wrote that "Mr. Gibson recalls the young Steve McQueen... I can't define 'star quality,' but whatever it is, Mr. Gibson has it." Gibson has also been likened to "a combination of Clark Gable and Humphrey Bogart." Gibson's roles in the Mad Max series of films, Peter Weir's Gallipoli (1981), and the Lethal Weapon series of films earned him the label of "action hero".

Later, Gibson expanded into human dramas such as the Franco Zeffirelli film version of Hamlet (1990), and comedic roles such as those in Maverick (1994) and What Women Want (2000). He moved to directing and producing with The Man Without a Face (1993), Braveheart (1995), The Passion of the Christ (2004), and Apocalypto (2006). Jess Cagle of Time compared Gibson with Cary Grant, Sean Connery, and Robert Redford. Connery once suggested Gibson should play the next James Bond to Connery's "M". Gibson turned down the role, reportedly because he feared being typecast.

=== Acting ===
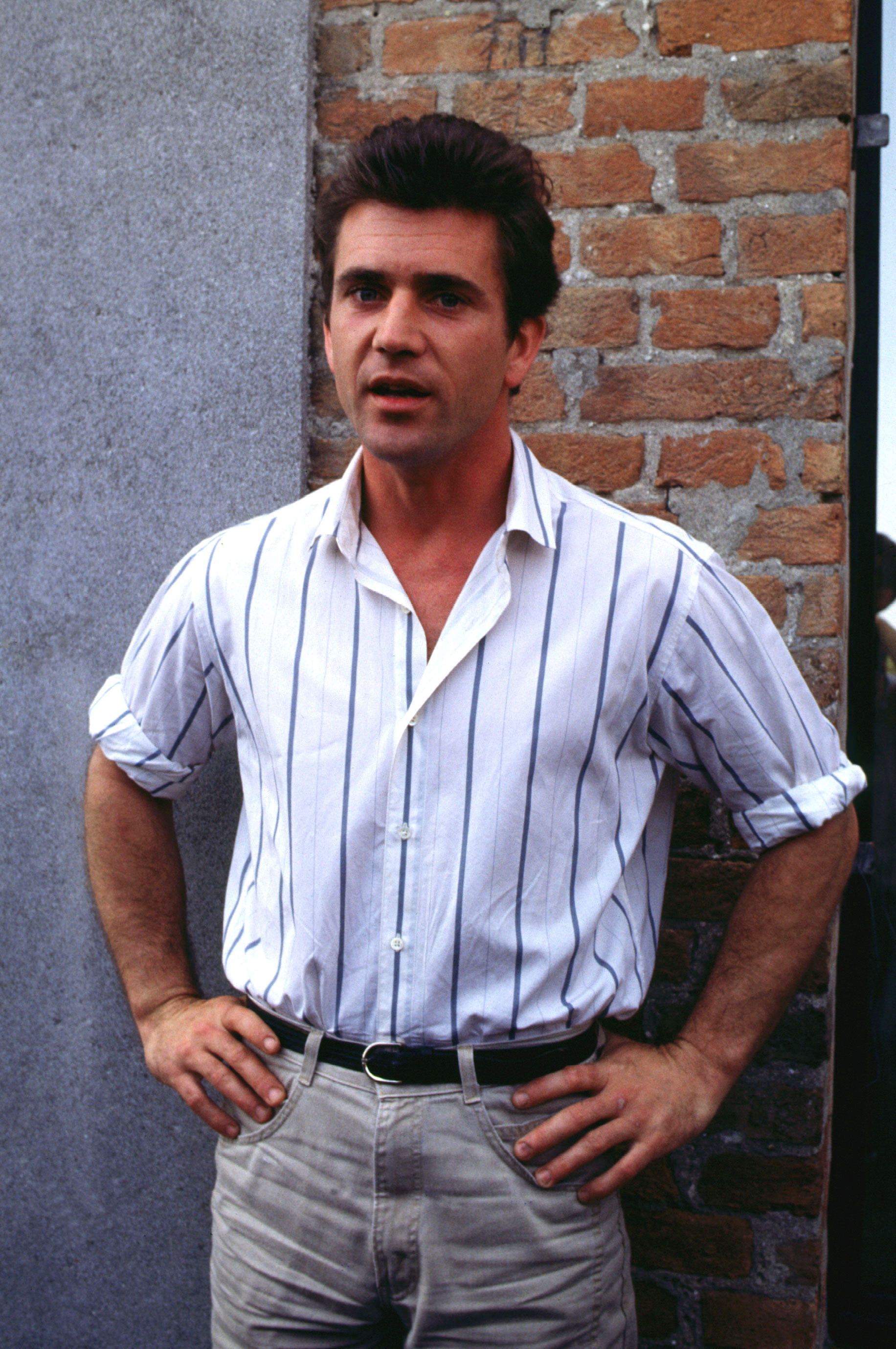
Gibson in 1985

Gibson studied at the National Institute of Dramatic Art in Sydney. As students, Gibson and actress Judy Davis played the leads in Romeo and Juliet, and Gibson played the role of Queen Titania in an experimental production of A Midsummer Night's Dream. After graduation in 1977, Gibson immediately began work on the filming of Mad Max, but continued to work as a stage actor, and joined the State Theatre Company of South Australia in Adelaide. Gibson's theatrical credits include the character Estragon (opposite Geoffrey Rush) in Waiting for Godot, and the role of Biff Loman in a 1982 production of Death of a Salesman in Sydney. Gibson's most recent theatrical performance, opposite Sissy Spacek, was the 1993 production of Love Letters by A. R. Gurney, in Telluride, Colorado.

While a student at NIDA, Gibson made his film debut in the 1977 film Summer City, for which he was paid $400. Gibson then played the title character in the film Mad Max (1979). He was paid $9000 for this role. Shortly after making the film, he did a season with the South Australian Theatre Company. During this period, he shared a $30 a week apartment in Adelaide with his future wife Robyn Moore. After Mad Max, Gibson played a mentally slow youth in the film Tim (also 1979). Gibson also appeared in Australian television series guest roles. He appeared in serial The Sullivans as naval lieutenant Ray Henderson, in police procedural Cop Shop, and in the pilot episode of prison serial Punishment which was produced in 1980, screened 1981.

Gibson joined the cast of the World War II action film Attack Force Z, which was not released until 1982 when Gibson had become a bigger star. Director Peter Weir cast Gibson as one of the leads in the World War I drama Gallipoli (1981), which earned Gibson another Best Actor Award from the Australian Film Institute. Gallipoli also helped to earn Gibson the reputation of a serious, versatile actor and gained him the Hollywood agent Ed Limato. The sequel Mad Max 2 (1982) was his first hit in America, where it was released as The Road Warrior. Gibson again received positive notices for his role in Peter Weir's romantic thriller The Year of Living Dangerously (1982). Following a one-year hiatus from film acting after the birth of his twin sons, Gibson took on the role of Fletcher Christian in The Bounty (1984). Gibson earned his first million dollar salary for playing Max Rockatansky for the third time, in Mad Max Beyond Thunderdome (1985).

Gibson's first American film was Mark Rydell's drama The River (1984), in which he and Sissy Spacek played struggling Tennessee farmers. Gibson then starred in the Gothic romance Mrs. Soffel (also 1984) for Australian director Gillian Armstrong. He and Matthew Modine played condemned convict brothers opposite Diane Keaton as the warden's wife who visits them to read the Bible. In 1985, after working on four films in a row, Gibson took almost two years off at his Australian cattle station. He returned to play the role of Martin Riggs in Lethal Weapon (1987), a film which helped to cement his status as a Hollywood "leading man". Gibson's next film was Robert Towne's Tequila Sunrise (1988), followed by Lethal Weapon 2 (1989). Gibson next starred in three films back-to-back, all released in 1990: Bird on a Wire, Air America, and Hamlet.

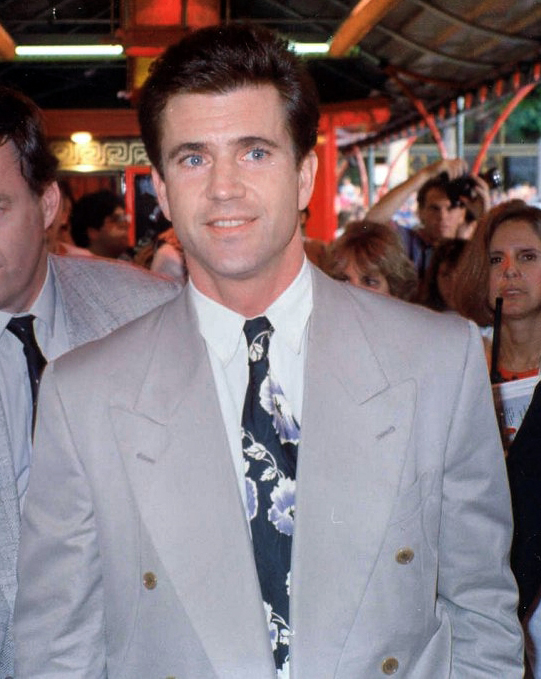
Gibson in 1990 at an Air America premiere

During the 1990s, Gibson alternated between commercial and personal projects. His films in the first half of the decade were Lethal Weapon 3 (1992), Forever Young (1992), The Man Without a Face (1993), Maverick (1994), and Braveheart (1995). He then starred in Ransom (1996), Conspiracy Theory (1997), Lethal Weapon 4 (1998), and Payback (1999). Gibson also served as the speaking and singing voice of John Smith in Disney's Pocahontas (1995).

Gibson was paid a record salary of $25 million to appear in The Patriot (2000). It grossed over $100 million, as did two other films he featured in that year, Chicken Run and What Women Want. In 2002, Gibson appeared in the Vietnam War drama We Were Soldiers and M. Night Shyamalan's Signs, which became the highest-grossing film of Gibson's acting career. Gibson's popularity declined after he had made some controversial statements.

While promoting Signs, Gibson said that he no longer wanted to be a movie star and would only act in film again if the script were truly extraordinary. In 2010, Gibson appeared in Edge of Darkness, which marked his first starring role since 2002 and was an adaptation of the BBC miniseries, Edge of Darkness. In June of the same year, Gibson was in Brownsville, Texas, filming scenes for the film Get the Gringo (2012), about a career criminal put in a tough prison in Mexico.

In 2010, following an outburst at his ex-girlfriend that was made public, Gibson was dropped from the talent agency of William Morris Endeavor. Gibson was lined up for a small role in The Hangover Part II but he was removed from the film after the cast and crew objected to his involvement. Gibson also played two villains: Luther Voz in Machete Kills in 2013, opposite Danny Trejo, and Conrad Stonebanks in The Expendables 3 opposite Sylvester Stallone in 2014. He starred as Kurt Mayron in the comedy film Daddy's Home 2 opposite Will Ferrell and Mark Wahlberg in 2017.

Gibson appeared in the lead role of director S. Craig Zahler's police brutality-themed film Dragged Across Concrete, released in 2018. He then starred in The Professor and the Madman in 2019 – he and the director both disowned the film.

=== Producing ===
After his success in Hollywood with the Lethal Weapon series, Gibson began to move into producing and directing. With partner Bruce Davey, Gibson formed Icon Productions in 1989 in order to make Hamlet.

In late 1996, New Zealand producer Timothy White became founding head of a co-production venture between Fox and Gibson, called Fox-Icon, based at Fox Studios Australia in Sydney. The company failed to produce a single film, shutting down in December 1999.

Gibson has produced a number of projects for television, including a biopic on the Three Stooges and the 2008 PBS documentary Carrier. Icon has grown from being just a production company to also be an international distribution company and film exhibitor in Australia and New Zealand. Gibson is credited as an executive producer of the 2023 movie Sound of Freedom, a film based on a true story which revolves around the topic of trafficking of children.

=== Directing ===
According to Robert Downey Jr., studio executives encouraged Gibson in 1989 to try directing, an idea he rebuffed at the time. Gibson made his directorial debut in 1993 with The Man Without a Face, followed two years later by Braveheart, which earned Gibson the Academy Award for Best Director. Gibson had long planned to direct a remake of Fahrenheit 451, but in 1999 the project was indefinitely postponed because of scheduling conflicts. Gibson was scheduled to direct Robert Downey Jr. in a Los Angeles stage production of Hamlet in January 2001, but Downey's drug relapse ended the project. In 2002, while promoting We Were Soldiers and Signs to the press, Gibson mentioned that he was planning to pare back on acting and return to directing. In September 2002, Gibson announced that he would direct a film called The Passion in Aramaic and Latin with no subtitles because he hoped to "transcend language barriers with filmic storytelling".

In 2004, he released the controversial film The Passion of the Christ, with subtitles, which he co-wrote, co-produced, and directed. The film went on to become the highest-grossing rated R film at the time with $370,782,930 in U.S. box office sales. Gibson directed a few episodes of Complete Savages for the ABC network. In 2006, he directed the action-adventure film Apocalypto, his second film to feature sparse dialogue in a non-English language. The next two films he directed were Hacksaw Ridge (2016) and Flight Risk (2025).

Gibson has expressed an intention to direct a movie set during the Viking Age, starring Leonardo DiCaprio. Like The Passion of the Christ and Apocalypto, he wants this speculative film to feature dialogue in period languages. However, DiCaprio ultimately opted out of the project. In a 2012 interview, Gibson announced that the project, which he has titled Berserker, was still moving forward.

In 2011, it was announced that Gibson had commissioned a screenplay from Joe Eszterhas about the Maccabees. The film is to be distributed by Warner Brothers Pictures. The announcement generated significant controversy. In April 2012, Eszterhas wrote a letter to Gibson accusing him of sabotaging their film about the Maccabees because he "hates Jews", and cited a series of private incidents during which he allegedly heard Gibson express extremely racist views. Although written as a private letter, it was subsequently published on a film industry website. In response, Gibson stated that he still intends to make the film, but will not base it upon Eszterhas's script, which he called substandard. Eszterhas then claimed his son had secretly recorded a number of Gibson's alleged "hateful rants". In a 2012 interview, Gibson explained that the Maccabees film was still in preparation. He explained that he was drawn to the Biblical account of the uprising due to its similarity to the American Old West genre.

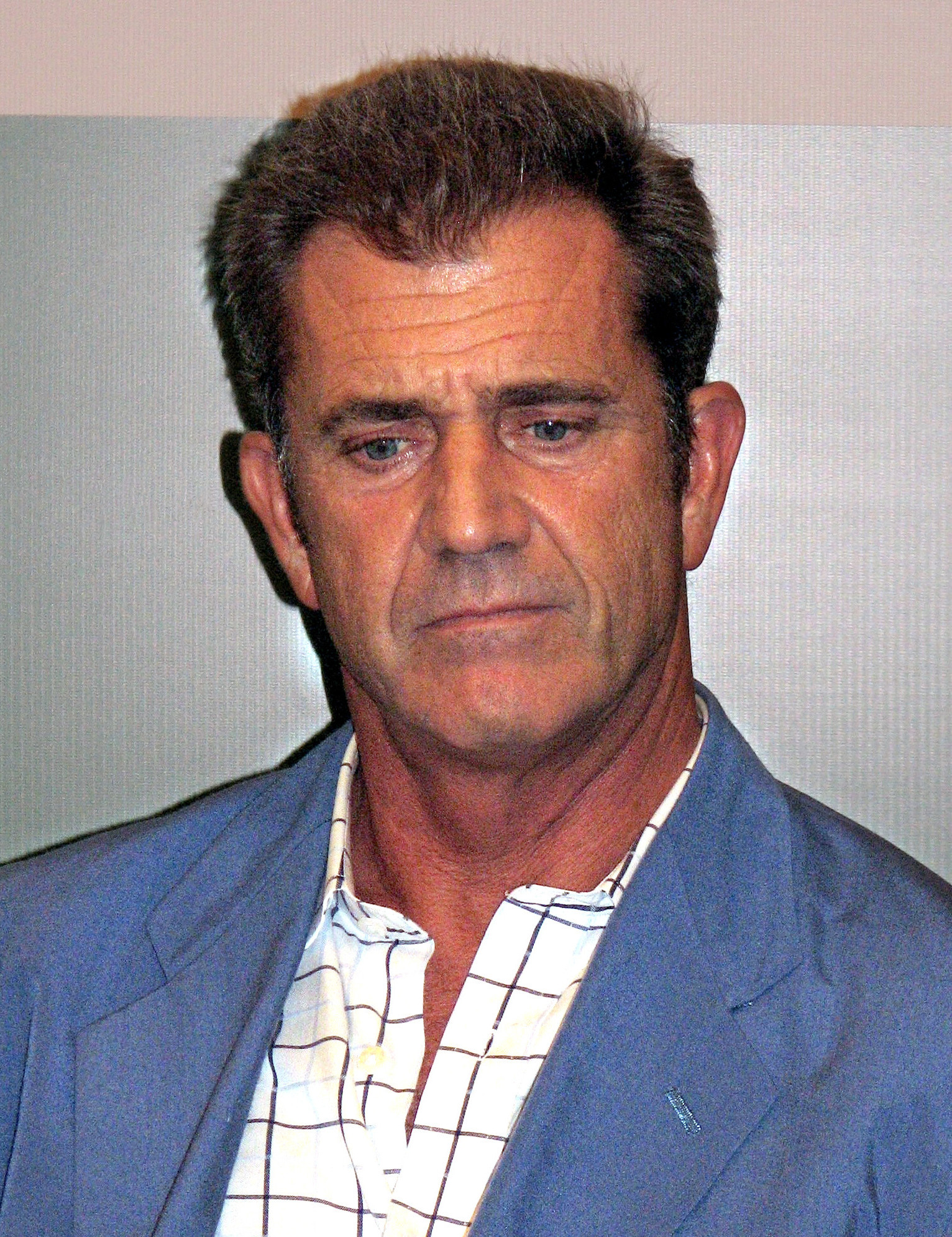
Gibson in 2007

In June 2016, Gibson announced that he will reunite with Braveheart screenwriter Randall Wallace to make a sequel for The Passion of the Christ, focusing on the resurrection of Jesus. In early November 2016, Gibson revealed on The Late Show with Stephen Colbert that the sequel's title will be The Passion of the Christ: Resurrection. He stated that the project could "probably be three years off" because "it's a big subject". In January 2023, it was reported that the sequel will begin filming later that year. In November 2016, the film critic Matt Zoller Seitz named Gibson "the pre-eminent religious filmmaker in the United States".

In May 2018, it was announced that Gibson would be directing a WWII film titled Destroyer. Destroyer, similar to Hacksaw Ridge, will also deal with the Battle of Okinawa in the Pacific Theater, although from a different front. It will be based on the heroic story of the crew belonging to USS Laffey (DD-724), who defended their ship from 22 kamikaze attacks. In September 2018, it was announced that Gibson would direct and co-write a remake of the 1969 film, The Wild Bunch. In May 2019, Deadline reported that Gibson was courting Michael Fassbender, Jamie Foxx, and Peter Dinklage to star in the project; that Jerry Bruckheimer will produce the film, and Warner Bros. will finance and release the project. In 2021, after the death of the Lethal Weapon director, Richard Donner, Gibson said he would direct and star in Lethal Weapon 5.

==== Directing style ====
Gibson has credited his directors, particularly George Miller, Peter Weir, and Richard Donner, with teaching him the craft of filmmaking and influencing him as a director. As a director, Gibson sometimes breaks the tension on set by having his actors perform serious scenes wearing a red clown nose. Helena Bonham Carter said, "He has a very basic sense of humour. It's a bit lavatorial and not very sophisticated." Gibson inserted a single frame of himself smoking a cigarette into the 2005 teaser trailer of Apocalypto.

== Film work ==
Gibson's screen acting career began in 1976, with a role on the Australian television series The Sullivans. In his career, Gibson has appeared in 65 films, including the Mad Max and Lethal Weapon film series. In addition to acting, Gibson has also directed six films, including Braveheart and The Passion of the Christ; produced 11 films; and written three films. Films either starring or directed by Mel Gibson have earned over US$2.5 billion, in the United States alone. Gibson's filmography includes television series, feature films, television films, and animated films.

=== Mad Max series ===
Gibson got his breakthrough role as the leather-clad post-apocalyptic survivor in George Miller's Mad Max. The independently financed blockbuster helped to make him an international star. In the United States, the actors' Australian accents were dubbed with American accents. The original film spawned two sequels: Mad Max 2 (known in North America as The Road Warrior) and Mad Max 3 (known in North America as Mad Max Beyond Thunderdome). A fourth movie, Mad Max: Fury Road (2015), was made with Tom Hardy in the title role.

=== Gallipoli ===
The 1981 Peter Weir film Gallipoli is about a group of young men from rural Western Australia who enlist in the Australian Imperial Force during World War I. They are sent to invade the Ottoman Empire, where they take part in the 1915 Gallipoli campaign. During the course of the movie, the young men slowly lose their innocence about the war. The climax of the movie centers on the catastrophic Australian offensive known as the Battle of the Nek.

Peter Weir cast Gibson in the role of Frank Dunne, an Irish-Australian drifter with an intense cynicism about fighting for the British Empire. According to Gibson, Weir wanted him for the role because he was not an "archetypal Australian". The critically acclaimed film helped to further launch Gibson's career. He won the award for Best Actor in a Leading Role from the Australian Film Institute.

=== The Year of Living Dangerously ===
Gibson played a naïve but ambitious journalist opposite Sigourney Weaver and Linda Hunt in Peter Weir's atmospheric 1982 film The Year of Living Dangerously, based on the novel of the same name by Christopher Koch. The movie was both a critical and commercial success, and the upcoming Australian actor was heavily marketed by MGM studio. In his review of the film, Vincent Canby of The New York Times wrote, "If this film doesn't make an international star of Mr. Gibson, then nothing will. He possesses both the necessary talent and the screen presence." According to John Hiscock of The Daily Telegraph, the film did, indeed, establish Gibson as an international talent.

Gibson was initially reluctant to accept the role of Guy Hamilton. "I didn't necessarily see my role as a great challenge. My character was, like the film suggests, a puppet. And I went with that. It wasn't some star thing, even though they advertised it that way." Gibson saw some similarities between himself and the character of Guy. "He's not a silver-tongued devil. He's kind of immature and he has some rough edges and I guess you could say the same for me."

=== The Bounty ===
Gibson followed the footsteps of Errol Flynn, Clark Gable, and Marlon Brando by starring as Fletcher Christian in a cinematic retelling of the Mutiny on the Bounty. The resulting 1984 film The Bounty is considered to be the most historically accurate version. However, Gibson has expressed a belief that the film's revisionism did not go far enough. He has stated that his character should have been portrayed as the film's antagonist. He has further praised Anthony Hopkins's performance as Lieutenant William Bligh as the best aspect of the film.

=== Lethal Weapon series ===
Gibson moved into more mainstream commercial filmmaking with the popular action comedy film series Lethal Weapon, which began with the 1987 original. In the films he played LAPD Detective Martin Riggs, a recently widowed Vietnam veteran with a death wish and a penchant for violence and gunplay. In the films, he is partnered with a reserved family man named Roger Murtaugh (Danny Glover) and starting with the second film, they're joined by a hyperactive informant named Leo Getz (Joe Pesci). Following the success of Lethal Weapon, director Richard Donner and principal cast revisited the characters in three sequels, Lethal Weapon 2 (1989), Lethal Weapon 3 (1993), and Lethal Weapon 4 (1998). With its fourth installment, the Lethal Weapon series embodied "the quintessence of the buddy cop pic".

The film series has since been rebooted with a television adaptation, which aired for three seasons on FOX. On November 15, 2021, Gibson confirmed that he will direct the fifth Lethal Weapon film following the death of director Richard Donner. "The man who directed all the 'Lethal films', Richard Donner, he was a big guy. He was developing the screenplay and he got pretty far along with it. And he said to me one day, 'Listen kid, if I kick the bucket you will do it.' And I said: 'Shut up.' But he did indeed pass away. But he did ask me to do it and at the time I didn't say anything. He said it to his wife and to the studio and the producer. So I will be directing the fifth one" Gibson said. In June 2024, Gibson confirmed in an interview with the Inspire Me podcast that he would direct the fifth installment of the Lethal Weapon franchise and that the film would stay true to Donner's vision and influence. Gibson also stated that he and Glover would return to play their respective roles of Riggs and Murtaugh.

=== Hamlet ===
Gibson made the unusual transition from action to classical drama, playing William Shakespeare's Danish prince in Franco Zeffirelli's Hamlet. Gibson was cast alongside experienced Shakespearean actors Ian Holm, Alan Bates, and Paul Scofield. He compared working with Scofield to being "thrown into the ring with Mike Tyson". Scofield said of Gibson "Not the sort of actor you'd think would make an ideal Hamlet, but he had enormous integrity and intelligence."

=== Braveheart ===
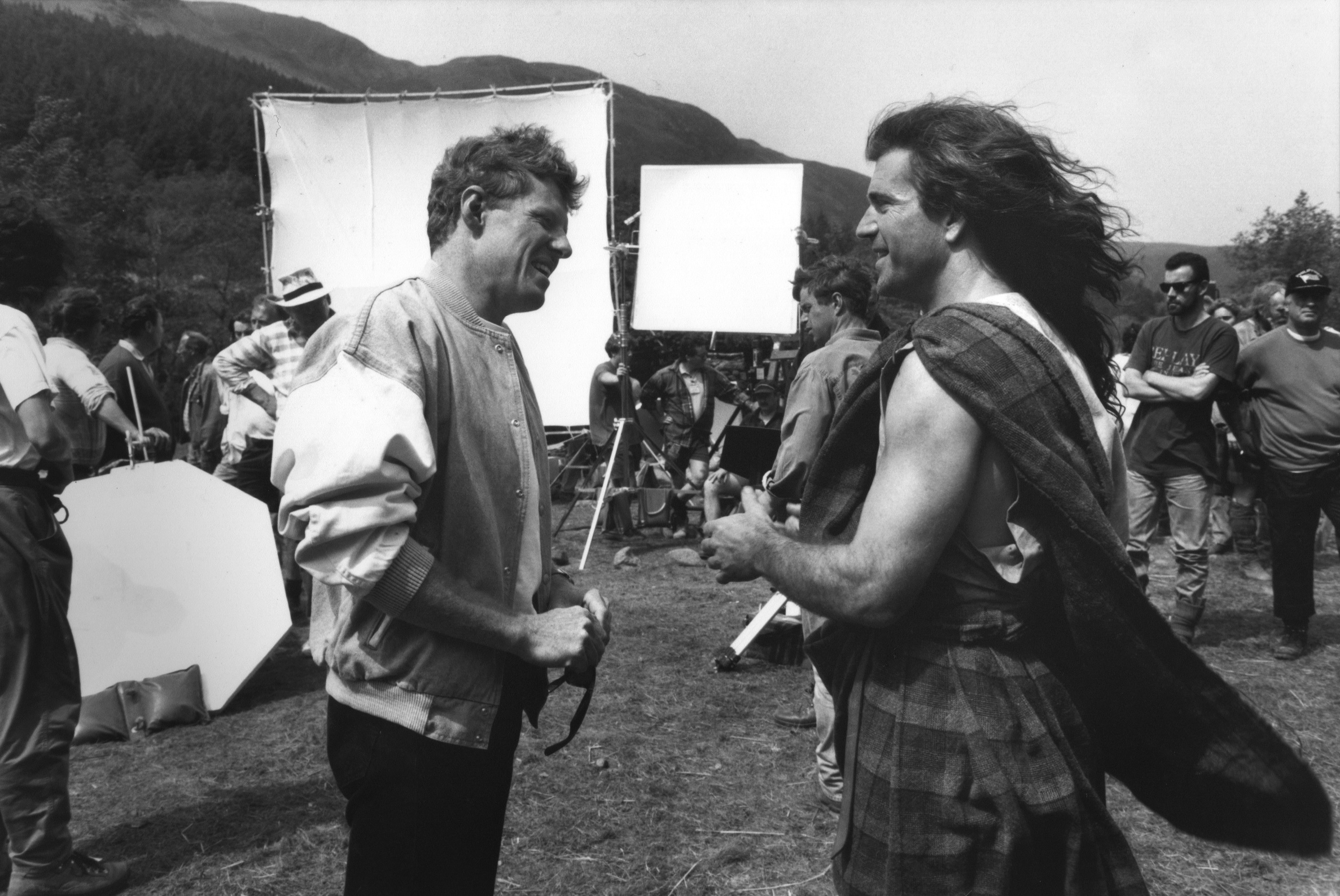
Gibson (right) on the set of Braveheart

In 1995, Gibson directed, produced, and starred in Braveheart, a biographical film of Sir William Wallace, a Scottish patriot and resistance fighter who was executed in 1305 for high treason against King Edward I of England. Gibson received two Academy Awards, Best Director and Best Picture, for his second directorial effort. In winning the Academy Award for Best Director, Gibson became only the sixth actor-turned-filmmaker to do so. Braveheart helped to revive the film genre of the historical epic; the Battle of Stirling Bridge sequence is considered by critics to be one of the all-time best-directed battle scenes.

The film's depiction of the Prince of Wales as an effeminate homosexual caused the film to be attacked by Gay and Lesbian Alliance Against Defamation (GLAAD), which was especially enraged by a scene in which King Edward I murders his son's male lover by throwing him out of a castle window.

Gibson, who had previously been reported making several homophobic statements, now replied, "The fact that King Edward throws this character out a window has nothing to do with him being gay ... He's terrible to his son, to everybody."

Gibson asserted that the reason that King Edward I kills his son's lover is because the king is a "psychopath". Gibson also expressed bewilderment that some filmgoers laughed at this murder:

We cut a scene out, unfortunately ... where you really got to know that character (Edward II) and to understand his plight and his pain... But it just stopped the film in the first act so much that you thought, "When's this story going to start?"

=== The Passion of the Christ ===
Gibson directed, produced, co-wrote, and funded the film The Passion of the Christ (2004), which chronicled the passion and death of Jesus (Jim Caviezel). The film was shot exclusively in Aramaic, Latin, and Hebrew. Gibson originally intended to release the film without subtitles, but eventually relented for theatrical exhibition. The film sparked divergent reviews, ranging from high praise to criticism of the violence. The Anti-Defamation League accused Gibson of antisemitism over the film's unflattering depiction of Caiaphas and the Sanhedrin.

In The Nation, reviewer Katha Pollitt wrote: "Gibson has violated just about every precept of the conference's own 1988 'Criteria' for the portrayal of Jews in dramatizations of the Passion (no bloodthirsty Jews, no rabble, no use of Scripture that reinforces negative stereotypes of Jews, etc.) ... The priests have big noses and gnarly faces, lumpish bodies, yellow teeth; Herod Antipas and his court are a bizarre collection of oily-haired, epicene perverts. The 'good Jews' look like Italian movie stars (Magdalene actually is an Italian movie star, the lovely Monica Bellucci); Mary, who would have been around 50 and appeared 70, could pass for a ripe 35."

Among those to defend Gibson were Orthodox Jewish rabbi Daniel Lapin and radio personality Michael Medved. Referring to ADL National Director Abraham Foxman, Rabbi Lapin said that by calling The Passion of the Christ antisemitic, "what he is saying is that the only way (for Christians) to escape the wrath of Foxman is to repudiate (their own) faith."

In an interview with The Globe and Mail, Gibson stated: "If anyone has distorted Gospel passages to rationalize cruelty towards Jews or anyone, it's in defiance of repeated Papal condemnation. The Papacy has condemned racism in any form... Jesus died for the sins of all times, and I'll be the first on the line for culpability". Eventually, the continued media attacks began to anger Gibson. After Hutton Gibson's Holocaust denial was used to attack his son's film in print by The New York Times writer Frank Rich, an enraged Mel Gibson retorted, "I want to kill him. I want his intestines on a stick.... I want to kill his dog."

The Passion of the Christ grossed US$611,899,420 worldwide and $370,782,930 in the U.S. alone, surpassing any motion picture starring Gibson. In U.S. box offices, it became (at the time) the seventh-highest-grossing film in history and the highest-grossing R-rated film of all time. The film was nominated for three Academy Awards and won the People's Choice Award for Favorite Dramatic Motion Picture.

=== Apocalypto ===
Gibson received further critical acclaim for his directing of the 2006 action-adventure film Apocalypto. Gibson's fourth directorial effort is set in Mesoamerica during the early 16th century against the turbulent end times of a Maya civilization. The sparse dialogue is spoken in the Yucatec Maya language by a cast of Native American descent.

Gibson himself has stated that the film is an attempt at making a deliberate point about great civilizations and what causes them to decline and disintegrate. Gibson said, "People think that modern man is so enlightened, but we're susceptible to the same forces—and we are also capable of the same heroism and transcendence." This theme is further explored by a quote from Will Durant, which is superimposed at the very beginning of the film: "A great civilization is not conquered from without until it has destroyed itself from within."

=== The Beaver ===
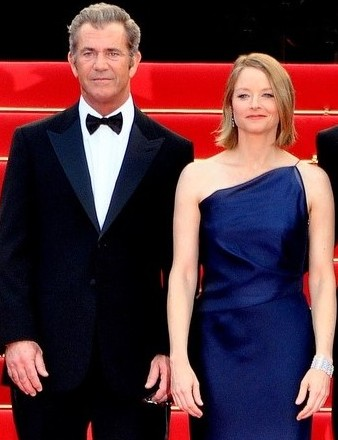
Gibson with Jodie Foster at the premiere of The Beaver at the 2011 Cannes Film Festival

Gibson starred in The Beaver, a domestic drama about a depressed alcoholic directed by former Maverick costar Jodie Foster. The Beaver premiered at the South by Southwest Festival in Austin, Texas on March 16, 2011. The opening weekend in 22 theaters was considered a flop; it made $104,000 which comes to a per-theater average of $4,745. The film's distributor, Summit Entertainment, had originally planned for a wide release of The Beaver for the weekend of May 20, but after the initial box-office returns for the film, the company changed course and decided instead to give the film a "limited art-house run". Michael Cieply of The New York Times observed on June 5, 2011, that the film had cleared just about $1 million, making it a certified "flop". Director Jodie Foster opined that the film did not do well with American audiences because it was a dramedy, and "very often Americans are not comfortable with [that]".

Before its release, much of the coverage focused on the unavoidable association between the protagonist's issues and Mel Gibson's own well-publicized personal and legal problems (see § Alcohol abuse and legal issues), including a conviction of battery of his ex-girlfriend. Wrote Time magazine, "The Beaver is a somber, sad domestic drama featuring an alcoholic in acute crisis ... It's hard to separate Gibson's true-life story from what's happening onscreen."

=== Hacksaw Ridge ===
In 2014, Gibson signed on to direct Hacksaw Ridge, a World War II drama based on the true story of conscientious objector Desmond T. Doss, played by Andrew Garfield.

The film premiered at the 73rd Venice Film Festival in September 2016 and received what The New Zealand Herald called "rave reviews". It won or was nominated for many awards, including Golden Globe nominations for Best Picture, Best Director for Gibson, and Best Actor for Garfield. Hacksaw Ridge was also nominated for an Academy Award for Best Picture, Best Director, Best Actor, Best Sound Editing, Best Sound Mixing, and Best Film Editing.

The film grossed $164 million worldwide, four times its production costs.

=== Flight Risk ===
In May 2023, it was announced that Gibson would direct a film titled Flight Risk, starring Mark Wahlberg. Released by Lionsgate, the film starred Wahlberg as "a pilot transporting a dangerous criminal for trial." It was later reported that the film had begun shooting in Las Vegas on June 16. Filming was reportedly unaffected by the SAG-AFTRA strike, having been exempted as an independent project. Flight Risk was released in the United States on January 24, 2025.

=== The Resurrection of the Christ: Part One and The Resurrection of the Christ: Part Two ===
Gibson’s next films are The Resurrection of the Christ: Part One and The Resurrection of the Christ: Part Two, two upcoming biblical drama films serving as sequels to his 2004 film The Passion of the Christ. The films stars Jaakko Ohtonen as Jesus Christ, replacing Jim Caviezel. The films are directed by Gibson and produced by Icon Productions in collaboration with Lionsgate. Part One is scheduled for theatrical release on May 6, 2027, and Part Two on May 25, 2028.

== Personal life ==
Because of his mother, Gibson retains dual Irish and American citizenship. He is also an Australian permanent resident. He has a brother named Chris Gibson.

=== Relationships ===
==== Robyn Denise Moore ====
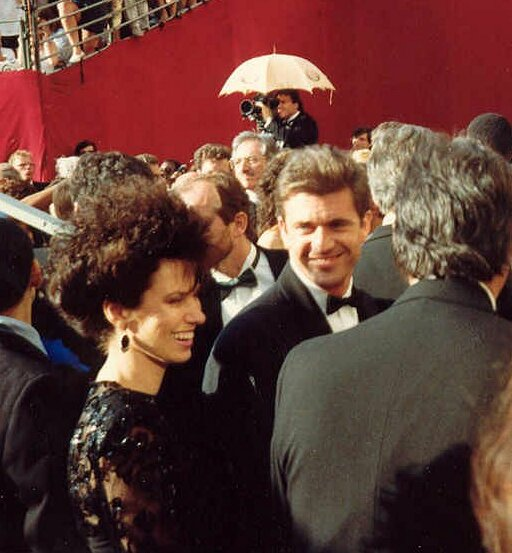
Gibson and Moore at the 60th Academy Awards in 1988

Gibson and Robyn Denise Moore met in 1977, soon after filming Mad Max, in Adelaide, South Australia. At the time, Moore was a dental nurse and Gibson was an unknown actor working for the South Australian Theatre Company. On June 7, 1980, Gibson and Moore were married in a Catholic church in Forestville, New South Wales. They have one daughter and six sons, including twins, and seven grandchildren as of 2024.

After 26 years of marriage, Gibson and Moore separated on July 29, 2006. In a 2011 interview, Gibson stated that the separation began the day following his arrest for drunk driving in Malibu. Moore filed for divorce on April 13, 2009, citing irreconcilable differences. In a joint statement, the Gibsons declared, "Throughout our marriage and separation we have always striven to maintain the privacy and integrity of our family and will continue to do so." The divorce filing followed the March 2009 release of photographs appearing to show him on a beach embracing his live-in girlfriend of one year, Russian songwriter and pianist Oksana Grigorieva.

The Gibsons' divorce was finalized on December 23, 2011, and the settlement with his ex-wife was said to be the highest in Hollywood history at over $400 million. They reportedly did not have a prenuptial agreement; because California is a community property state, Moore received half of everything her husband had earned during their marriage.

==== Oksana Grigorieva ====
In a 2010 interview, Grigorieva stated that, when she first began being wooed by Gibson, she was surprised and only accepted his advances after learning that the actor-director and his wife had been separated for more than 18 months. Grigorieva added, "He wrote me a lot of poetry. It was very beautiful, impressionistic, like an edgy, modern iambic pentameter. Mel has a really good grasp of language, he's fantastic with words."

On April 28, 2009, Gibson made a red carpet-appearance with Grigorieva. She had previously had a son with actor Timothy Dalton, and she gave birth to Gibson's second daughter and eighth child in October that year. By April 2010, Gibson and Grigorieva had split. On June 21, 2010, Grigorieva filed a restraining order against Gibson to keep him away from her and their child. The restraining order was modified the next day regarding Gibson's contact with their child. Gibson obtained a restraining order against Grigorieva on June 25, 2010.

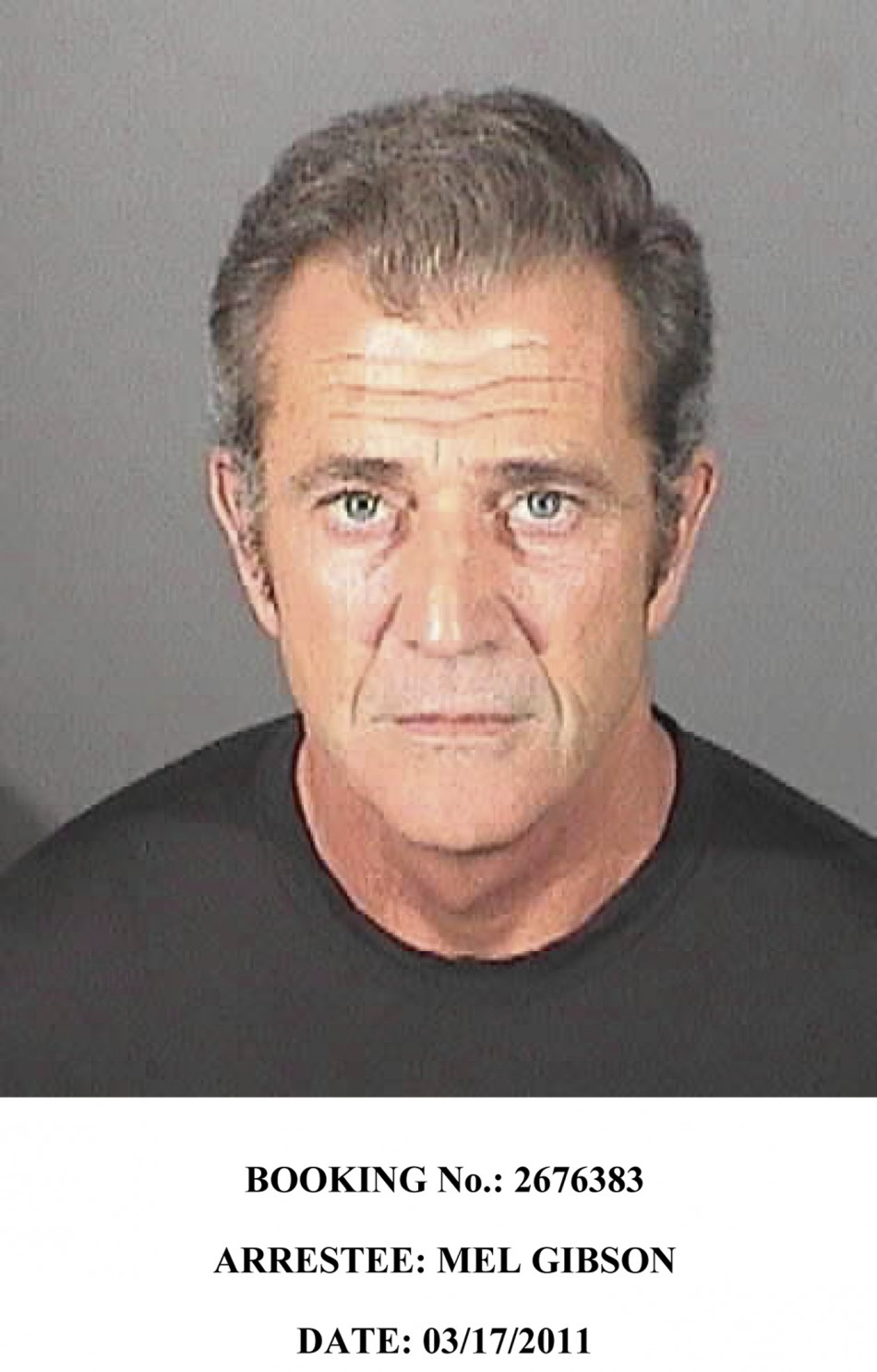
Gibson's 2011 mugshot from booking with El Segundo Police Department

Grigorieva accused Gibson of domestic violence, leading to an investigation by the Los Angeles County Sheriff's Department in July 2010. On July 9, 2010, some audio recordings of a rant, allegedly directed by Gibson toward Grigorieva, were posted on the internet. The same day Gibson was dropped by his agency, William Morris Endeavor. Gibson's estranged wife Robyn filed a court statement declaring that she never experienced any abuse from Gibson; while forensic experts have questioned the validity of some of the tapes, Gibson himself did not deny they were accurate at the time. In March 2011, Mel Gibson agreed to plead no contest to a misdemeanor battery charge. In April 2011, Gibson finally broke his silence about the incident in question. In an interview with Deadline Hollywood, Gibson expressed gratitude to longtime friends Whoopi Goldberg and Jodie Foster, both of whom had spoken publicly in his defense. About the recordings, Gibson said,

I've never treated anyone badly or in a discriminatory way based on their gender, race, religion or sexuality—period. I don't blame some people for thinking that though, from the garbage they heard on those leaked tapes, which have been edited. You have to put it all in the proper context of being in an irrationally, heated discussion at the height of a breakdown, trying to get out of a really unhealthy relationship. It's one terribly awful moment in time, said to one person, in the span of one day and doesn't represent what I truly believe or how I've treated people my entire life.

In the same interview, Gibson stated

I was allowed to end the case and still maintain my innocence. It's called a West Plea and it's not something that prosecutors normally allow. But in my case, the prosecutors and the judge agreed that it was the right thing to do. I could have continued to fight this for years and it probably would have come out fine. But I ended it for my children and my family. This was going to be such a circus. You don't drag other people in your life through this sewer needlessly, so I'll take the hit and move on.

In August 2011, Gibson settled with Grigorieva, who was awarded $750,000, joint legal custody, and a house in Sherman Oaks, California until their daughter Lucia turns 18. In 2013, Grigorieva sued her attorneys, accusing them of advising her to sign a bad agreement, including a term that taking legal action against Gibson would compromise her financial settlement.

==== Rosalind Ross ====
Gibson began a relationship with former champion equestrian vaulter and writer Rosalind Ross in 2014. Ross gave birth to their son, Gibson's ninth child, in 2017. They separated in 2025.

=== Investments ===
Gibson is a property investor, with multiple properties in Malibu, California, several locations in Costa Rica, a private island in Fiji, and properties in Australia. In December 2004, Gibson sold his 300 acres (1.2 km^{2}) Australian farm in the Kiewa Valley for $6 million. Also in December 2004, Gibson purchased Mago Island in Fiji from Tokyu Corporation of Japan for $15 million. Descendants of the original native inhabitants of Mago, who were displaced in the 1860s, have protested the purchase. Gibson stated it was his intention to retain the pristine environment of the undeveloped island.

In early 2005, he sold his 45,000 acres (180 km^{2}) Montana ranch to a neighbor. In April 2007, he purchased a 400 acres (1.6 km^{2}) ranch in Costa Rica for $26 million, and, in July 2007, he sold his 76 acres (31 ha) Tudor estate in Connecticut (which he purchased in 1994 for $9 million) for $40 million to an unnamed buyer. Also that month, he sold a Malibu property for $30 million that he had purchased for $24 million two years before.

In 2008, he purchased the Malibu home of actors David Duchovny and Téa Leoni.

In 2009 he bought a house in Sherman Oaks, Los Angeles, built in 2006 with designs inspired by architect Frank Lloyd Wright. He paid $2.4 million for the property, which he bought under a trust, with Vicki Lynn Christianson, COO of his production company Icon Productions, as trustee. He sold the property at a loss in February, for $2.1 million.

==== Jersey Leaks ====
Records of Gibson using offshore accounts and business were revealed in the Jersey Leaks, records of more than 20,000 individuals held with the wealth management firm Kleinwort Benson.

=== Philanthropy ===
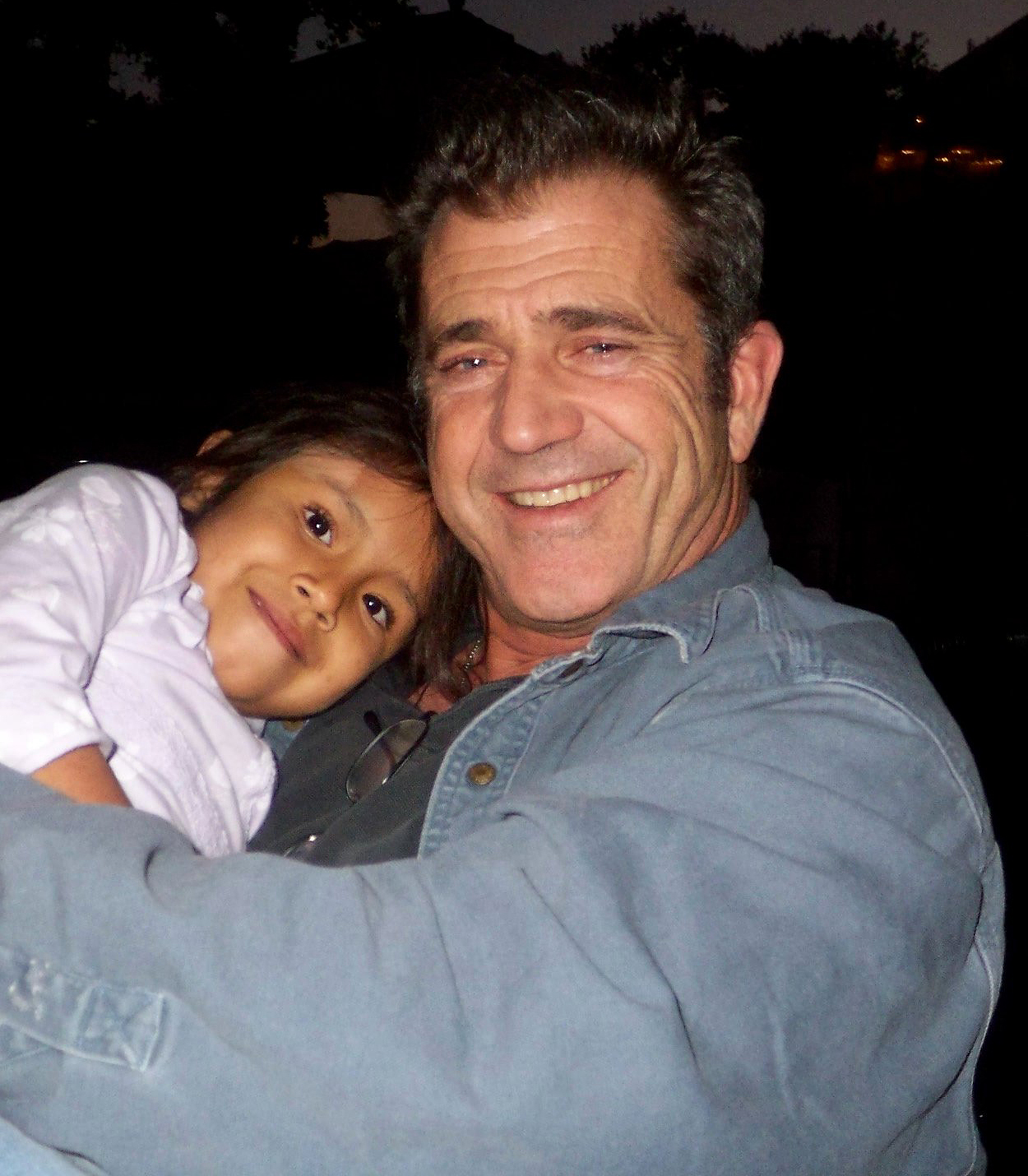
Gibson at the Christmas party for charity Mending Kids International in 2007. His former wife Robyn was president of the charity.

Gibson and his former wife have contributed a substantial amount of money to various charities, one of which is Healing the Children. According to Cris Embleton, one of the founders, the Gibsons gave millions to provide lifesaving medical treatment to needy children worldwide. They also supported the restoration of Renaissance artwork and gave millions of dollars to NIDA.

Gibson donated $500,000 to the El Mirador Basin Project to protect the last tract of virgin rainforest in Central America and to fund archeological excavations in the "cradle of Mayan civilization". In July 2007, Gibson again visited Central America to make arrangements for donations to the indigenous population. Gibson met with Costa Rican president Óscar Arias to discuss how to "channel the funds". During the same month, Gibson pledged to give financial assistance to a Malaysian company named Green Rubber Global for a tire recycling factory located in Gallup, New Mexico. While on a business trip to Singapore in September 2007, Gibson donated to a local charity for children with chronic and terminal illnesses. Gibson is also a supporter of Angels at Risk, a nonprofit organization focusing on education about drug and alcohol abuse among teens.

In a 2011 interview, Gibson said of his philanthropic works, "It gives you perspective. It's one of my faults, you tend to focus on yourself a lot. Which is not always the healthiest thing for your psyche or anything else. If you take a little time out to think about other people, it's good. It's uplifting."

=== Religion and politics ===
==== Faith ====
Gibson was raised a sedevacantist traditionalist Catholic (who reject the validity of all Popes since the Second Vatican Council and hold that the Holy See is currently vacant). His father Hutton Gibson was an ardent sedevacantist and a Holocaust denier who held strong antisemitic views and supported various conspiracy theories.

During the filming of The Passion of The Christ, he had daily visits from both local priests and priests from the traditionalist Institute of Christ the King (a non-sedevacantist group in full communion with the Pope) in France.

When asked about the Catholic doctrine of Extra Ecclesiam nulla salus, Gibson replied, "There is no salvation for those outside the Church ... I believe it. Put it this way. My wife is a saint. She's a much better person than I am. Honestly. She's ... Episcopalian, Church of England. She prays, she believes in God, she knows Jesus, she believes in that stuff. And it's just not fair if she doesn't make it, she's better than I am. But that is a pronouncement from the chair. I go with it." When he was asked whether John 14:6 is an intolerant position, he said that "through the merits of Jesus' sacrifice ... even people who don't know Jesus are able to be saved, but through him." Gibson has told Diane Sawyer that he believes non-Catholics and non-Christians can go to Heaven.

Gibson's acquaintance Fr. William Fulco said in 2009 that Gibson denies neither the pope nor Vatican II; even so, as of 2021, Gibson attended the Church of the Holy Family, a traditionalist church he founded and funds in Southern California.

In a 1990 interview with Barbara Walters, Gibson said: "God is the only one who knows how many children we should have, and we should be ready to accept them. One can't decide for oneself who comes into this world and who doesn't. That decision doesn't belong to us."

Gibson, in a letter published by Italian Traditionalist Catholic author Aldo Maria Valli on his website on 6 July 2024, stated his full support for the recently excommunicated Italian archbishop Carlo Maria Viganò, who he praised as "a modern day Athanasius!", stating that he agreed with him in considering that the "post conciliar church of Vatican II is a counterfeit church", and that "being called a schismatic & being excommunicated by Jorge Bergoglio is like a badge of honor when you consider he is a total apostate & expels you from a false institution." He also stated that "I am with you & I hope Bergoglio excommunicates me from his false church also."

In an interview with Joe Rogan in 2025, Gibson said that he believed that the Catholic Church was instituted by Jesus Christ and he believed in Catholic Christianity "to the full."

==== Politics ====
In a July 1995 interview with Playboy, Gibson said President Bill Clinton was a "low-level opportunist" and someone was "telling him what to do". He said that the Rhodes Scholarship was established for young men and women who want to strive for a "new world order" and this was a campaign for Marxism. Gibson later backed away from such conspiracy theories saying, "It was like: 'Hey, tell us a conspiracy'... so I laid out this thing, and suddenly, it was like I was talking the gospel truth, espousing all this political shit like I believed in it." In the same 1995 Playboy interview, Gibson argued against ordaining women to the priesthood.

In 2004, he publicly spoke out against taxpayer-funded embryonic stem-cell research that involves the cloning and destruction of human embryos. In March 2005, he condemned the outcome of the Terri Schiavo case, referring to Schiavo's death as "state-sanctioned murder".

Gibson questioned the Iraq War in March 2004. In 2006, Gibson said that the "fearmongering" depicted in his film Apocalypto "reminds me a little of President Bush and his guys." He later said in 2016 that he is anti-war but has an appreciation for the sacrifices made by "warriors".

Gibson complimented filmmaker Michael Moore and his documentary Fahrenheit 9/11 when he and Moore were recognized at the 2005 People's Choice Awards. Gibson's Icon Productions originally agreed to finance Moore's film but later sold the rights to Miramax Films. Moore said that his agent Ari Emanuel claimed that "top Republicans" called Gibson to tell him, "Don't expect to get more invitations to the White House". Icon's spokesman dismissed this story, saying "We never run from a controversy. You'd have to be out of your mind to think that of the company that just put out The Passion of the Christ."

In a 2011 interview, Gibson stated:

The whole notion of politics is they always present you with this or this or this. I'll get a newspaper to read between the lines. Why do you have to adhere to prescribed formulas that they have and people argue over them and they're all in a box. And you watch Fox claw CNN, and CNN claw Fox. Sometimes I catch a piece of the news and it seems insanity to me. I quietly support candidates. I'm not out there banging a drum for candidates. But I have supported a candidate and it's a whole other world. Once you've been exposed to it, once or twice or however many times, if you know the facts and see how they're presented, it's mind-boggling. It's a very scary arena to be in, but I do vote. I go in there and pull the lever. It's kind of like pulling the lever and watching the trap door fall out from beneath you. Why should we trust any of these people? None of them ever deliver on anything. It's always disappointing.

Gibson revealed in a 2016 interview with Jorge Ramos that he voted for neither Donald Trump nor Hillary Clinton in the 2016 United States presidential election. In July 2021, Gibson was recorded saluting Trump while attending UFC 264, which went viral over the Internet. In October 2020, Gibson released a statement regarding the Second Nagorno-Karabakh War and expressing solidarity with the Armenian people. Gibson endorsed Trump in the 2024 United States presidential election, adding that Kamala Harris had "the IQ of a fence post". On January 16, 2025, it was announced by president-elect Donald Trump that Gibson would serve in a new role as one of three "special ambassadors" to Hollywood, sharing the role with fellow actors Jon Voight and Sylvester Stallone, with the latter rejecting the appointment. Trump stated that he wants these actors to make Hollywood "stronger than ever before" by bringing back business lost to "foreign countries". Trump said that the three would be his "eyes and ears" and he would act on their suggestions, but their duties were not specified.

=== Alcohol abuse and legal issues ===
Gibson has said that he started drinking at the age of 13. In a 2002 interview for the documentary actingclassof1977.com, made by his former National Institute of Dramatic Art colleague Sally McKenzie, Gibson said, "I had really good highs but some very low lows."

Gibson was banned from driving in Ontario, Canada, for three months in 1984, after rear-ending a car in Toronto while under the influence of alcohol. He retreated to his Australian farm for over a year to recover, but he continued to struggle with drinking. Despite this problem, Gibson gained a reputation in Hollywood for professionalism and punctuality such that frequent collaborator Richard Donner was shocked when Gibson confided that he was drinking five pints of beer for breakfast. Reflecting in 2003 and 2004, Gibson said that despair in his mid-30s led him to contemplate suicide, and he meditated on Christ's Passion to heal his wounds. He took more time off acting in 1991 and sought professional help. That year, Gibson's attorneys were unsuccessful at blocking the Sunday Mirror from publishing what Gibson shared at AA meetings. In 1992, Gibson provided financial support to Hollywood's Recovery Center, saying, "Alcoholism is something that runs in my family. It's something that's close to me. People do come back from it, and it's a miracle."

On August 17, 2006, Gibson pleaded no contest to a misdemeanor drunken-driving charge and was sentenced to three years' probation. He was ordered to attend self-help meetings five times a week for four-and-a-half months and three times a week for the remainder of the first year of his probation. He was also ordered to attend a First Offenders Program and fined $1,300, and his license was restricted for 90 days.

In February 2008, it was reported that screenwriter Benedict Fitzgerald was suing Gibson, along with Vicki Christianson, Icon Productions, Icon Distribution, Marquis Films, and Airborne Productions, for defrauding him of millions of dollars, as well as incorrectly taking co-writing credit for the screenplay of Passion of the Christ. In May 2009, Gibson agreed to an undisclosed settlement with Fitzgerald. Details of the settlement, agreed at Los Angeles County Superior Court, were not released. Gibson's representatives did not comment on the settlement.

=== Palisades Fire ===
In January 2025, during the Southern California wildfires, Gibson's home in Malibu burned down in the Palisades Fire. He criticized California governor Gavin Newsom's response to the crisis.

== Controversies ==
GLAAD accused Gibson of homophobia after a December 1991 interview in the Spanish newspaper El País in which he made derogatory comments about gay people. Gibson later defended his comments, and rejected calls to apologize even as he faced fresh accusations of homophobia in the wake of his film Braveheart. Gibson joined GLAAD in hosting 10 lesbian and gay filmmakers for an on-location seminar on the set of the movie Conspiracy Theory in January 1997. In 1999, when asked about the comments to El País, Gibson said, "I shouldn't have said it, but I was tickling a bit of vodka during that interview, and the quote came back to bite me on the ass."

On July 28, 2006, Gibson was arrested in Malibu, California, for driving under the influence (DUI) while speeding in his vehicle with an open container of liquor. According to a 2011 article in Vanity Fair, Gibson first told the arresting officer, "My life is over. I'm fucked. Robyn's going to leave me." According to the arrest report, Gibson exploded into an angry tirade when the arresting officer would not allow him to drive home. In what Vanity Fair was later told was an attempt at suicide by cop, Gibson said to the arresting officer, "Fucking Jews... the Jews are responsible for all the wars in the world. Are you a Jew?"

After the arrest report was leaked on TMZ.com, Gibson issued two apologies through his publicist, and—in a televised interview with Diane Sawyer—he affirmed the accuracy of the quotations. He further apologized for his "despicable" behavior, saying that the comments were "blurted out in a moment of insanity", and asked to meet with Jewish leaders to help him "discern the appropriate path for healing." After Gibson's arrest, his publicist said he had entered a recovery program to battle alcoholism.

Winona Ryder has repeatedly told a story to various press outlets about speaking to Mel Gibson with her friend at a party. Gibson allegedly responded to her friend, who was gay, by asking if he was going to get AIDS from speaking with him, and later asked Ryder, who is Jewish, if she was an "oven dodger." A representative of Gibson later denied the accusations.

In July 2010, Gibson had been recorded during a phone call with Grigorieva where he suggested that if she got "raped by a pack of niggers", she would be to blame, and threatening to burn down Grigorieva's house while she was inside it. Grigorieva said the voices on the multiple recordings leaked were of herself and Gibson, according to CNN. He was barred from coming near Grigorieva or their daughter due to a domestic violence–related restraining order. The Los Angeles County Sheriff's Department launched a domestic violence investigation against Gibson, later dropped when Gibson pleaded no contest to a misdemeanor battery charge.

Gibson's controversial statements resulted in his being blacklisted in Hollywood for almost a decade. Both Robert Downey Jr. and journalist Allison Hope Weiner advocated for forgiveness for Gibson in 2014. In 2016, Gibson's film Hacksaw Ridge, which received six Academy Award nominations, resulted in what was perceived as a "thaw" in his reputation.

In August 2026, Gibson attended Fan Expo Canada in Toronto and made hand gestures behind an ASL interpreter while he walked on a stage to attend a Q&A. He was accused of mocking the interpreter. He later said in a statement, "There was no intended maliciousness attached, and I certainly apologize to anyone who was upset by it."

== Awards and honors ==
=== Major film awards ===
Gibson has won numerous major awards for his film achievements, including multiple awards for the following:

Year	Title	Academy Awards		BAFTA Awards		Golden Globe Awards	
Year	Title	Nominations	Wins	Nominations	Wins	Nominations	Wins
1995	Braveheart	10	5	7	3	4	1
2004	The Passion of the Christ	3					
2006	Apocalypto	3		1		1	
2016	Hacksaw Ridge	6	2	5	1	3	
Total		22	7	13	4	8	1

=== Other awards, honors, and appointments ===
In 1985, Gibson was named the "Sexiest Man Alive" by People, the first person to be named so. Gibson quietly declined the Chevalier des Arts et Lettres from the French government in 1995 as a protest against France's resumption of nuclear testing in the Southwest Pacific. On July 25, 1997, Gibson was named an honorary Officer of the Order of Australia (AO), in recognition of his "service to the Australian film industry". The award was honorary because substantive awards are made only to Australian citizens.

In 2003, he was awarded an honorary doctorate by the Loyola Marymount University. In 2004, he was named "world's most powerful celebrity" by Forbes. In the same year, The Hollywood Reporter named him Innovator of the Year. In 2007, Gibson was awarded an honorary fellowship in performing arts by Limkokwing University of Creative Technology. In 2008, he won the Outstanding Contribution to World Cinema Award at the Irish Film and Television Awards. He was the recipient of the Golden Raspberry Award for Worst Supporting Actor for Daddy's Home 2, and was nominated for the same award for The Expendables 3 (2014), Dangerous (2021) and Confidential Informant (2023).

== General bibliography ==
- McCarty, John (September 2001). The Films of Mel Gibson. New York: Citadel. ISBN 0-8065-2226-7.
- Clarkson, Wensley (September 2004). Mel Gibson: Man on a Mission. London: John Blake. ISBN 1-85782-537-3.
