= Free Willy (franchise) =

American children's film media franchise

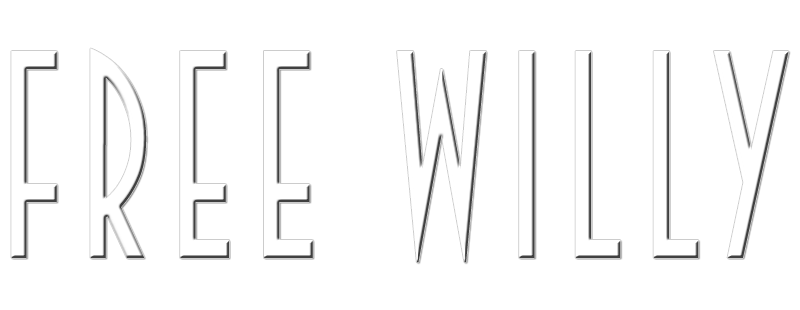
- Official franchise logo
- Created by: Keith Walker
- Original work: Free Willy (1993)
- Owners: Warner Bros. Pictures (Skydance)
- Years: 1993–present

Films and television
- Films: Free Willy (1993); Free Willy 2: The Adventure Home (1995); Free Willy 3: The Rescue (1997)
- Animated series: Free Willy (1994–1995)
- Direct-to-video: Free Willy: Escape from Pirate's Cove (2010)

Audio
- Soundtracks: Free Willy; Free Willy 2: The Adventure Home; Free Willy 3: The Rescue; Free Willy: Escape from Pirate's Cove

Free Willy is a media franchise from Warner Bros. that started with the 1993 film Free Willy that went on to become a sleeper hit at the box office. The original series primarily follows a street kid named Jesse who befriends an orca named Willy with whom he develops a strong friendship. He and Willy are challenged with overcoming or defeating various hazards to the ocean or Willy himself including corporate greed, hunters, poachers, and oil disasters.

Following the success of Free Willy, it was followed by an animated series, two sequels, and a direct-to-video first reboot film, and an upcoming theatrical second reboot film.

== Films ==
Film	U.S. release date	Director	Screenwriter(s)	Story by	Producer(s)
Free Willy	June 11, 1993	Simon Wincer	Corey Blechman & Keith A. Walker	Keith A. Walker	Jennie Lew Tugend and Lauren Shuler Donner
Free Willy 2: The Adventure Home	July 19, 1995	Dwight H. Little	John Mattson, Karen Janszen & Corey Blackman	John Mattson, Karen Janszen & Corey Blackman	Jennie Lew Tugend and Lauren Shuler Donner
Free Willy 3: The Rescue	August 7, 1997	Sam Pillsbury	John Mattson	John Mattson	Jennie Lew Tugend
Free Willy: Escape from Pirate's Cove	March 23, 2010	Will Geiger	Will Geiger	Cindy McCreery	David Wicht, Laura Lodin and John Stainton
Untitled reboot	TBA	TBA	Mary-Margaret Kunze & Jade Halley Bartlett	Mary-Margaret Kunze & Jade Halley Bartlett	Angela Russo-Otstot, Michael Disco and Kassee Whiting

Free Willy story chronology
- Free Willy (1993)
- Free Willy (TV series; season 1 (1994))
- Free Willy 2: The Adventure Home (1995)
- Free Willy (TV series; season 2 (1995))
- Free Willy 3: The Rescue (1997)

=== Free Willy (1993) ===
A delinquent orphan named Jesse is forced to clean up graffiti at the Northwest Adventure Park as part of his probation while staying with new foster parents. There, he becomes attached to a captive killer whale, the film's eponymous "Willy", until he discovers a secret from the park's greedy owner that threatens their friendship.

=== Free Willy 2: The Adventure Home (1995) ===
Two years after setting him free, Jesse reunites with Willy during a camping trip in the San Juan Islands with the Greenwoods and newly-discovered half-brother named Elvis as the teenager tries to help Willy and his siblings Luna and Littlespot return to their mother Catspaw after an oil spill separated them in addition to endangering Luna.

=== Free Willy 3: The Rescue (1997) ===
Jesse works with his old friend Randolph at an orca institute where he tracks down Willy and his mate Nicky, and also teams up with Max to stop the latter's father from hunting the whales.

=== Free Willy: Escape from Pirate's Cove (2010) ===
Kirra discovers a baby killer whale washed ashore in the lagoon near her grandfather's rundown seaside amusement park during her stay in South Africa. She names the orca Willy and embarks on a quest to lead him back to his pod before he is sold. This film served as a reboot in the series.

=== Future ===
In July 2026, a second reboot of the franchise was announced to be in development. Kassee Whiting with Mary-Margaret Kunze and Jade Halley Bartlett will serve as co-screenwriters, while Angela Russo-Otstot, Michael Disco, Kassee Whiting, Lauren Shuler Donner, and Courtney Baker will produce. Anthony and Joe Russo will serve in executive producing roles. The project is intended to be a joint-venture production between Warner Bros. and AGBO.

== Television ==
Series	Season	Episodes	Originally released			Showrunner
Series	Season	Episodes	First released	Last released	Network	Showrunner
Free Willy	1	13	September 24, 1994	December 24, 1994	ABC / Canal+ / Global Television Network	Patrick Loubert
Free Willy	2	8	September 9, 1995	December 16, 1995	ABC / Canal+ / Global Television Network	Patrick Loubert

=== Free Willy (1994–1995) ===
The show continues the adventures of the orca Willy and Jesse, the boy who freed him from captivity as shown in the film.

=== Main cast and characters ===
List indicators

This section includes characters who have appeared in major or notable roles in the franchise.

- An empty grey cell indicates the character was not in the film.
- ^{V} indicates a voice-only role.

Characters	Films				Television series
Characters	Free Willy	Free Willy 2: The Adventure Home	Free Willy 3: The Rescue	Free Willy: Escape from Pirate's Cove	Free Willy^{V}
Jesse Greenwood	Jason James Richter	Jason James Richter	Jason James Richter		Zachary Bennett
Willy	Keiko	Appeared (Note: While Willy appears in Free Willy 2: The Adventure Home and Free Willy 3: The Rescue, Keiko did not perform scenes for either of these films, and the character was portrayed using an animatronic Orca.)	Appeared	Appeared	Paul Haddad
Randolph Johnson	August Schellenberg	August Schellenberg	August Schellenberg		Michael Fletcher
Annie Greenwood	Jayne Atkinson	Jayne Atkinson			Sheila McCarthy
Glen Greenwood	Michael Madsen	Michael Madsen			Ron Len
Rae Lindley	Lori Petty				
Dial	Michael Ironside				
Wade	Richard Riehle				
Dwight Mercer	Mykelti Williamson	Mykelti Williamson			
Perry	Michael Bacall				
Gwenie	Danielle Harris				
Elvis Greenwood		Francis Capra			
Nadine		Mary Kate Schellhardt			
John Milner		Jon Tenney			
Kate Haley		Elizabeth Peña			
Wilcox		M. Emmet Walsh			
Captain Nilson		Steve Kahan			
Commander Blake		John Considine			
Drew Halbert			Annie Corley		
Max Wesley			Vincent Berry		
John Wesley			Patrick Kilpatrick		
Kron			Ian Tracey		
1st Mate Sanderson			Peter LaCroix		
Captain Drake			Matthew Walker		
Dineen			Stephen E. Miller		
Mary Wesley			Tasha Simms		
Kirra Cooper				Bindi Irwin	
Gus Grisby				Beau Bridges	
Mansa				Bongolethu Mbutuma	
Sifiso				Siyabuela Ramba	
Rolf V.D. Woods				Stephen Jennings	
Blikkie				Matthew Roberts	
Jayce				Heima Jaffa	
Dr. Sam Cooper				Kevin Otto	
Diff				Louw Venter	
Rockland Stone The Machine					Gary Krawford
Marlene					Rachel Crawford
P.R. Frickley					Andrew Sabiston
Mr. Naugle					Neil Crone
Einstein					Kevin Zegers
Lucille					Alyson Court
Amphonoids					James Kidnie

== Crew and additional production details ==
Film	Crew/Detail					
Film	Composer(s)	Cinematographer	Editor(s)	Production companies	Distributing companies	Running time
Free Willy	Basil Poledouris	Robbie Greenberg	O. Nicholas Brown	Alcor Films; Le Studio Canal+ Regency Enterprises; Donner/Shuler-Donner	Warner Bros.	1 hr 52 mins
Free Willy 2: The Adventure Home	Basil Poledouris	László Kovács	Dallas Puett; Robert Brown	Alcor Films; Le Studio Canal+ Regency Enterprises; Shuler-Donner/Donner	Warner Bros.	1 hr 38 mins
Free Willy 3: The Rescue	Cliff Eidelman	Tobias A. Schliessler	Margaret Goodspeed	Regency Enterprises; Shuler Donner/Donner	Warner Bros.	1 hr 26 mins
Free Willy: Escape from Pirate's Cove	Enis Rotthoff	Robert Malpage	Sabrina Plisco	Film Africa Worldwide; ApolloMovie Beteiligungs	Warner Premiere	1 hr 41 mins

== Reception ==
=== Box office performance ===
Film	Release date	Box office revenue			Budget	Ref.
Film	Release date	North America	Other territories	Worldwide	Budget	Ref.
Free Willy	July 16, 1993	$77,709,806	$76,000,000	$153,709,806	$20,000,000	
Free Willy 2: The Adventure Home	July 19, 1995	$30,077,111	$38,000,000	$68,000,000	$31,000,000	
Free Willy 3: The Rescue	August 8, 1997	$3,446,539	—N/a	$3,446,539	—N/a	
Total		$111,222,275	$76,000,000	$187,222,275	$51,000,000	

=== Critical and public response ===
Film	Rotten Tomatoes	Metacritic	CinemaScore
Free Willy	71% (31 reviews)	79 (14 reviews)	A
Free Willy 2: The Adventure Home	50% (26 reviews)	—N/a	A-
Free Willy 3: The Rescue	44% (16 reviews)	—N/a	B+
Free Willy: Escape from Pirate's Cove	—N/a	—N/a	—N/a
