= Free Willy (disambiguation) =

Free Willy is a 1993 American family drama film.

Free Willy or Free Willie may also refer to:

- Free Willy (franchise)
  - Free Willy 2: The Adventure Home, the 1995 sequel to the 1993 film
  - Free Willy 3: The Rescue, the 1997 sequel to the 1995 film
  - Free Willy: Escape from Pirate's Cove, the 2010 sequel to the 1997 film
- Free Willy (TV series), an animated series based on the 1993 film
- "Free Willie", an episode of Due South TV series
