= Free Willy (TV series) =

- Genre: Animation
- Created by: Patrick Loubert
- Based on: Free Willy by Keith Walker; Corey Blechman
- Developed by: Patsy Cameron; Ted Anasti
- Directed by: Gary Hurst
- Voices of: Zachary Bennett; Paul Haddad; Michael Fletcher; Ron Lea; Sheila McCarthy; Neil Crone; Rachael Crawford; Geordie Johnson; Andrew Sabiston; Gary Krawford; James Kidnie; Kevin Zegers; Alyson Court
- Countries of origin: United States; Canada; France; Netherlands
- Original languages: English; French
- No. of seasons: 2
- No. of episodes: 21

Production
- Executive producers: Patrick Loubert; Michael Hirsh; Clive A. Smith; Lauren Shuler Donner; Richard Donner; Arnon Milchan
- Running time: 21 minutes
- Production companies: Nelvana; Regency Enterprises; Le Studio Canal+; Donner/Shuler-Donner Productions; Warner Bros. Television

Original release
- Network: ABC (U.S.); Global Television Network (Canada); BBC1 (U.K.); Canal+ (France)
- Release: September 24, 1994 – December 16, 1995

Free Willy is an animated television series, based on the 1993 film of the same name. The television show was produced by Warner Bros. Television, Regency Enterprises, Canadian company Nelvana and French company Le Studio Canal+ for Warner Bros.

The show continues the adventures of the orca Willy and Jesse, the boy who freed him from captivity as shown in the film. In retrospect, the series also anticipates multiple plot elements of the film sequel, Free Willy 2: The Adventure Home, released the following summer. The overarching conflict is reminiscent of Moby-Dick: a powerful oil baron, known to the main characters only as a cyborg called "The Machine" until the final episodes, loses his arm and part of his face to Willy while committing an environmental atrocity and wants revenge upon "that rotten whale... and his boy". The show aired on ABC from September 24, 1994 to December 16, 1995.

== Plot ==
Jesse has been adopted by his foster parents, the Greenwoods, and they have moved from Seattle to the Pacific coast. He is given a job at the Misty Island Oceanic Reserve, a local wildlife rescue and research institute where Randolph, his Native American mentor from the film, now works. In the first episode, Jesse discovers that he has the ability to talk to animals and understand their speech; Randolph, a Haida, explains that he is a Truth Talker. This revelation allows for Willy and the other sea creatures featured in the show to have full personalities and more prominent roles in key plot events. Jesse and Randolph work with Mr. Naugle, the head biologist and Marlene, a research assistant, who are studying Einstein, a dolphin and Lucille, a sea lion, teaching them behavioral communication with normal humans. While the sea animals can talk, including Willy, Jesse is the only one who can talk to Willy and the sea animals.

The main villain of the series, similar in personality to Captain Ahab, is a cyborg called the "Machine" who holds Willy responsible for his loss of an arm and part of his face. It was initially implied that Willy had bitten them off, but a flashback revealed that his submarine was destroyed upon encountering Willy, hurling him into another ship's screw propeller. When not using his new submarine to create environmental havoc, he dons a mask and glove, perhaps a nod to the contributions of Michael Jackson to the films, for disguise and continues to run an oil company under his former identity, Rockland Stone.

The Machine relies on synthetic henchmen called Amphonids, made from radioactive clay and toxic waste. They mainly function as comic relief; they are somewhat reluctant to carry out instructions to pollute and destroy the environment, preferring to slouch around and entertain themselves, and often making costly and catastrophic errors for the Machine. But he does also pay people to carry out his instructions, threatening dire consequences if they reveal his misdemeanors.

Throughout the series, Jesse is constantly fighting plots and schemes hatched by the Machine to destroy Willy, such as releasing deadly parasites and creating genetic engineering giant squid predatory to orca, and to despoil the ecosystem, such as wanton spilling of garbage, toxic waste and oil into the sea. Meanwhile, he attempts to influence the ostensibly reasonable business magnate Mr. Stone to adopt environmentally friendly industrial practices through his publicist, P. R. Frickey.

Towards the end of the first season, Jesse starts suspecting that Rockland Stone is The Machine who faces him trying to wipe out the salmon streams in Misty Island's inland rivers, "Milestones". In the final episode, "Ghost Ship", Jesse and Willy come across a half sunken ship that has something to do with The Machine's past and the Stone Cooperation. Frustrated in figuring out if Rockland Stone is the villain that he and Willy have been fighting against, Jesse unmasks the Machine before the public, which in his Stone identity is running for senator, and escapes a close encounter from him well trying to find evidence.

The next day of the senator election, Jesse and Willy go and gather video tape evidence of the ship, which is full of war material, and the Machine tries to get rid of the ship with the use of explosives. In the end, "Stone" loses the election thanks to Jesse's video tape showing what the ship was carrying which was shown to the public through media coverage and Jesse and Willy celebrate his defeat afterwards.

While the first season centers mostly around Willy and Jesse's adventures at the Misty Island Oceanic Reserve, the second season takes them to the Arctic with eco-activist Ben Shore. They discover an untouched paradise island with various healthful benefits "Paradise Found", and are greeted by Arktos, a bear who claims Jesse is the "protector" of the island, and other talking animals. The Machine follows and attempts to industrialize the island, destroying its natural beauty and benefit to the ecosystem.

Ben heroically demolishes the passageway to the island after Jesse and Willy escape, thwarting The Machine, but injuring and trapping himself. The healing effects of the island restore Ben's health and he lives happily in his environmental utopia, having given Jesse a carved eagle necklace as a keepsake to carry on his work. In the second to last episode of the season, "Turmoil", Jesse, Willy and the Eco Ranger crew meet up with Marlene's former teacher, the balding chemist Dr. Elliot who has created a special formula called oil solidification to help stop future oil spills.

The Machine hears about this new formula and has plans in mind. He kidnaps Dr. Elliot and causes a massive intentional oil spill to suffocate Willy and other sea life. He also impersonates Dr. Elliot, using a different disguise, and influences the public in giving a ten million dollar donation for cleanup efforts.

Jesse and Willy were able to see through the disguise, rescue Dr. Elliot, prevent the fraudulent donation and stop the oil with the formula. Upon returning to Misty Island, Jesse and Willy become entwined in a Christmastime plot, "Yuletide or Redtide", also the series finale, to use a biodegradable jet ski, assumed to be a gift from his parents, Glen and Annie, but actually from Stone, for the release of deadly red tide to thrive in the unseasonably warm water, implied to be an effect of climate change.

Unchecked, the microorganism would simultaneously destroy Willy, the ecosystem and Jesse's reputation. When The Machine is defeated by teamwork and a sudden cold spell, saving everyone's good cheer, the Amphonids make themselves into a distorted Christmas tree and actually sing along with the townspeople, to their master's chagrin.

== Voice cast ==
- Zachary Bennett as Jesse, a boy who was abandoned by his mother when he was younger.
- Paul Haddad as Willy, a highly intelligent killer whale and Jesse's best friend.
- Michael Fletcher as Randolph Johnson, Willy's keeper and Jesse's friend and mentor.
- Ron Lea as Glen Greenwood, Jesse's foster father.
- Sheila McCarthy as Annie Greenwood, Jesse's foster mother.

=== New characters ===
- Neil Crone as Mr. Naugle, the head marine biology of the Misty Island Research Institute.
- Rachael Crawford as Marlene, a marine research assistant at the Misty Island Institute who works with Randolph and Jesse and made friends with.
- Geordie Johnson as Ben Shore, an eco-activist, Randolph's old friend and Jesse's hero.
- Andrew Sabiston as P. R. Frickey, an unwitting publicist for Stone Industries.
- Gary Krawford as Rockland Stone/Machine, a corrupt businessman and Willy's enemy.
- James Kidnie as Amphonids, toxic waste blob servants of the Machine.
- Kevin Zegers as Einstein, a highly intelligent bottlenose dolphin.
- Alyson Court as Lucille, a highly intelligent California sea lion.

== Series overview ==
Season	Episodes	Originally released	
Season	Episodes	First released	Last released
1	13	September 24, 1994	December 24, 1994
2	8	September 9, 1995	December 16, 1995

== Episodes ==
=== Season 1 (1994) ===
No.	Title	Written by	Original release date
1	"Truth Talker"	Patsi Cameron & Tedd Anasti	September 24, 1994
Jesse discovers that he is a truth-talker, after he and Willy find Lucille, the sea lion, injured from the Machine.
2	"Cry of the Dolphin"	Patsi Cameron & Tedd Anasti	October 1, 1994
The Machine's illegal toxic waste dump on the ocean floor kills a dolphin family and poisons Einstein, a shy but highly intelligent baby dolphin.
3	"Stone"	Patsi Cameron & Tedd Anasti	October 8, 1994
The Machine's new whale-stunning sonar pulse is just what he needs to illegally harvest whales for their oil.
4	"Defenders of the Deep"	Doug Molitor	October 15, 1994
Annie feels she and Jesse are growing apart so she invites him to take a cruise with her on Stone Corporation's new whale watching science ship, unaware that the ship's captain is using the ship to dump garbage on the ocean floor.
5	"The Eel Beast"	Patsi Cameron & Tedd Anasti	October 22, 1994
Marlene learns to trust Willy as she and the orca must work together to rescue Jesse from a deep labyrinth of caverns inhabited by a large eel.
6	"Cephalopod"	Evelyn Gabai	October 29, 1994
The Machine's improper genetic research creates a giant squid he names Goliath, whose purpose is to destroy Willy.
7	"Sealed Fate"	Patsi Cameron & Tedd Anasti	November 5, 1994
Lucille thinks it is fun to be a human, and to make more human friends she volunteers to be a part of a sea circus.
8	"Shark Masters"	Don Gillies	November 12, 1994
The Machine is luring hundreds of sharks into Misty Island's coastal waters in hopes of ruining the tourist economy.
9	"Hope"	Emily Dwass	November 19, 1994
The effects of pesticides on birds and animals are dissected as Lucille introduces the institute gang to Faith, a brown pelican whose eggs are breaking too soon.
10	"Milestones"	Doug Molitor	December 3, 1994
Jesse faces the Machine who is trying to wipe out all the salmon streams in the Misty Islands by illegal clear cut logging.
11	"The Catch"	Patsi Cameron & Tedd Anasti	December 10, 1994
The institute's battle against illegal fishing takes a political turn as the institute crew uses the law to stop illegal drift netting in international waters.
12	"The Treasure of Misty Cove"	Don Gillies	December 17, 1994
Jesse finds a gold doubloon and is gradually overcome by gold fever as he and a reluctant Willy search for pirate treasure.
13	"Ghost Ship"	Marion Wells	December 24, 1994
Frustrated in their quest to unmask The Machine's true identity, Jesse and Willy stumble on a clue from his past: an unearthly ghost ship full of volatile war material.

=== Season 2 (1995) ===
No.	Title	Original release date
14	"Voyage of the Eco Ranger II"	September 9, 1995
The Machine flees the Misty Islands and plans revenge on the Misty Island Institute. Randolph's old friend Ben Shore arrives and helps the gang defeat the Machine and save the institute. After that, Ben, Randolph, Marlene, Jesse, Lucille and Willy head to the Arctic.
15	"Tip of the Iceberg"	September 16, 1995
The Eco Rangers arrive to the Arctic to begin ecological work on the surrounding wildlife, only to find out there has been some suspicious seal hunting.
16	"The Hunted"	September 23, 1995
After chasing off a small group of whale hunters suspected of being sent by the Machine, Ben hatches a plan to bring the Machine into the authorities.
17	"Paradise Found"	September 30, 1995
Jesse and Willy discover an untouched island after swimming through an underwater passage. The Machine unfortunately follows them and plans to industrialize the island's beauty for its natural benefits.
18	"Pier Pressure"	October 7, 1995
The Eco Rangers make a stop to a small town in Alaska to help fix a problem with an overcrowded seal population. Lucille, feeling left out, decides to join the herd.
19	"Live and Let Dive"	October 14, 1995
Continuing their voyage back to Misty Island, the Eco Ranger crew makes a stop to meet up with a local research team after they encounter a tsunami. Jesse falls in love with a female researcher, which makes Willy feel lonely and left out.
20	"Turmoil"	October 21, 1995
Marlene's former teacher, Dr. Elliot, has created a new formula called an oil solidification to help stop future oil spills. The Machine hears about the formula and starts making plans for its use.
21	"Yule Tide and Red Tide"	December 16, 1995
The Eco Rangers return home in time to celebrate Christmas and Jesse receives a special gift from an unknown benefactor, a jet-ski. While trying it out, he finds out that it was actually from the Machine, who filled the water craft with a sample of a red tide from Florida, which starts spewing the microbes into Misty Island's unseasonably warm waters causing a red tide.

== Home media ==
In October 2011, the first season was released through Amazon Prime Video and iTunes, while the second season has yet to be released. The series has never received a home video release in North America, but a double box VHS set was released in the United Kingdom during the mid-1990s.
