= Peggy Walton-Walker =

American film and television actress (born 1943)

- Born: 1943 (age 82–83); Charleston, South Carolina

Peggy Walton-Walker is an American film and television actress.

== Early years ==
She was born Peggy Jean Walton in 1943 in Charleston, South Carolina. Walton-Walker attended Vigor High School in Prichard, Alabama, where she graduated in 1961. She went on to earn a Bachelor of Music degree from Birmingham–Southern College in 1965, the same year in which she was selected and crowned as Miss Birmingham-Southern College.

== Career ==
Most of Walton-Walker's film and television roles have been small, often playing an unnamed character such as a bookkeeper, receptionist, or nurse. However, she had a featured role on A Different World in the 1990 episode "Pride and Prejudice" as Amy, a retail sales clerk dismissive of a black customer, who then makes excessive purchases in a failed effort to counteract the prejudice, later returning the purchases on principle. She also appeared in an acclaimed 1987 episode of Designing Women called "Killing All the Right People," one of the first series-television episodes to deal with prejudice against people with AIDS. Other television appearances include the science-fiction program Quantum Leap, detective series such as Banacek, and recurring roles on the soap operas Dynasty and General Hospital. She also has worked as a voice actor, doing voices for various characters on the children's program The Smurfs.

Her films include the horror films What's the Matter with Helen? (1971) and Pumpkinhead (1988), the 1982 comedy Best Friends, the teen drama For Keeps (1988), and the Christian drama The Second Chance in 2006. In 2007, she is slated to have a featured role in the film The American Standards.

She had a more notable part in the unreleased 1972 movie Lapin 360. It was later released as Always the Innocent on VHS. Actor Jared Martin who also worked in the movie said in 2007 that she was dating the producer and noted how in their scenes together "all the close-ups were for her".

Although authorship of the screenplay for Free Willy is credited to her late husband, Walton-Walker's listing as a "Film School Advisor" for Watkins Film School in Nashville, Tennessee credits her as author. The Christopher Landon-led Netflix film We Have a Ghost starring David Harbour and Anthony Mackie that she also credited a cameo role as Miss Ramonda Scheller.

== Personal life ==
Walton-Walker was married to writer Keith A. Walker from 1975 until his death from cancer in December, 1996. Walton-Walker married Larry Lord in June 2016.
