= Richard Donner =

American filmmaker (1930–2021)

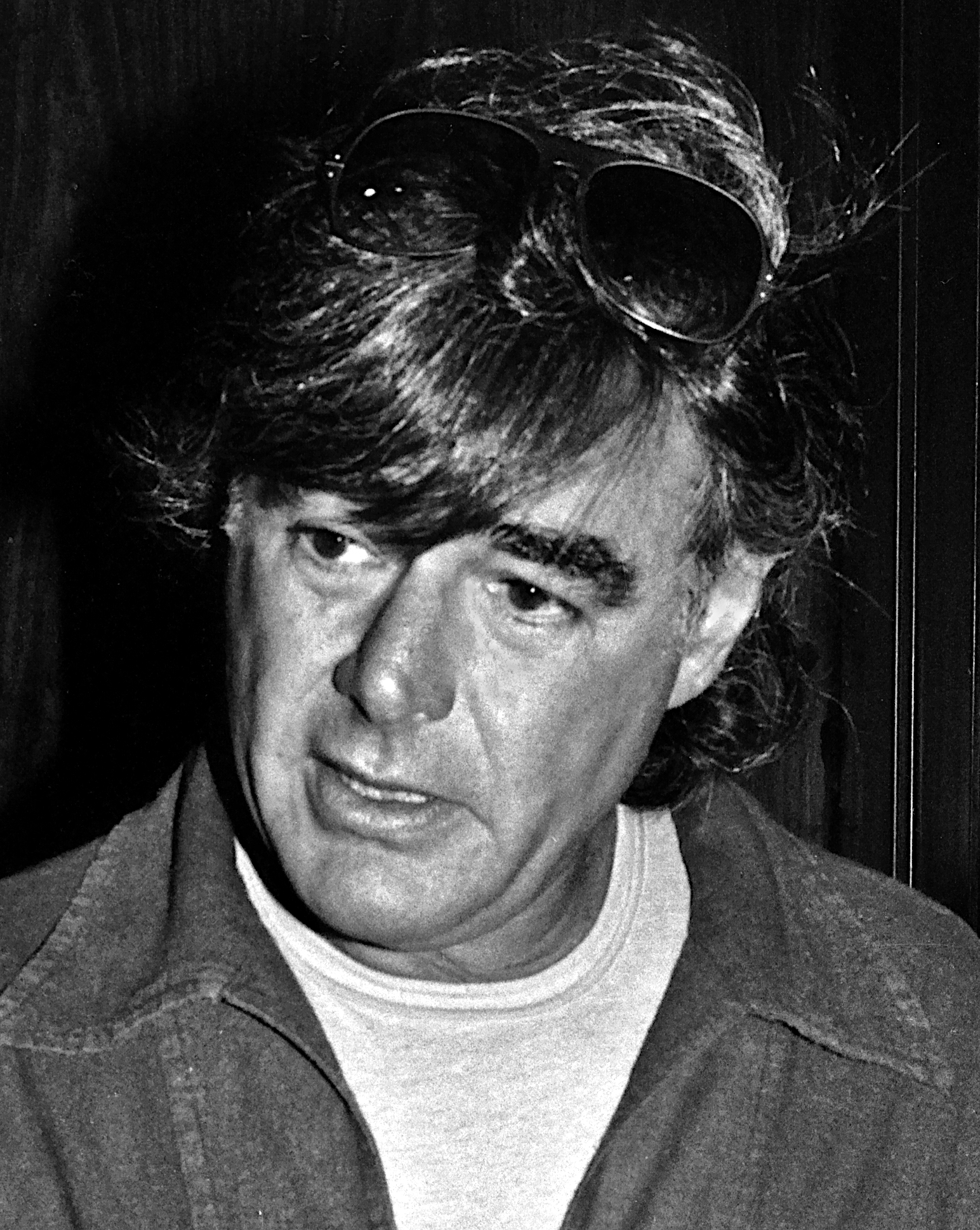
- Donner in 1979
- Born: Richard Donald Schwartzberg; April 24, 1930; New York City, New York, U.S.
- Died: July 5, 2021 (aged 91); West Hollywood, California, U.S.
- Other names: Richard D. Donner; R. D. Donner; Don Dicker
- Education: New York University
- Occupations: Director; producer
- Years active: 1957–2021
- Notable work: The Omen; Superman; The Goonies; Lethal Weapon; Scrooged; The Donners' Company
- Spouse: Lauren Shuler (m. 1985)

Richard Donner (born Richard Donald Schwartzberg; April 24, 1930 – July 5, 2021) was an American filmmaker. Described as "one of Hollywood's most reliable makers of action blockbusters", Donner directed some of the most financially successful films of the 1970s and 1980s. His career spanning more than six decades crossed genres and influenced trends among filmmakers across the world.

Donner began his career in 1957 as a television director. In the 1960s, he directed episodes of the series The Rifleman, The Man from U.N.C.L.E., The Fugitive, The Twilight Zone, The Banana Splits, and many others. Donner made his film debut with the low-budget aviation drama X-15 in 1961, but had his critical and commercial breakthrough with the horror film The Omen in 1976. He directed the landmark superhero film Superman in 1978, which provided an inspiration for the fantasy film genre to eventually gain artistic respectability and commercial dominance. Donner later went on to direct films in the 1980s such as The Goonies and Scrooged, while reinvigorating the buddy cop film genre with the Lethal Weapon series.

Donner and his wife, Lauren, owned a production company, The Donners' Company, which is most successful for producing the Free Willy and X-Men film franchises. Donner also produced Tales from the Crypt and co-wrote several comic books for Superman publisher DC Comics. In 2000, Donner received the President's Award from the Academy of Science Fiction, Fantasy and Horror Films.

== Early life ==
Richard Donald Schwartzberg was born in the Bronx, New York City, to Russian Jewish parents, Hattie (née Horowitz) Schwartzberg (1902–1996) and Fred Schwartzberg (1901–1971). His father owned a small furniture-manufacturing business and his mother was a housewife. He had a sister, Joan. His grandfather owned a Brooklyn movie theatre which had an early influence on his perception of film.

After graduating from high school, Donner served in the U.S. Navy, becoming an aerial photographer. He briefly attended New York University but left to pursue a career in acting, relocating to Los Angeles and adopting the stage name "Richard Donner".

== Career ==
=== Television work ===
Initially, Donner wanted to develop a career as an actor. He gained a big part in a television program directed by Martin Ritt, who encouraged Donner to become a director instead. Ritt hired Donner as his assistant. Later, Donner was on the staff of Desilu, where he directed commercials. He made the transition into television dramas in the late 1950s, directing some episodes of the Steve McQueen western serial Wanted Dead or Alive and the Chuck Connors western The Rifleman.

During his early career as a director he worked on over twenty-five television series, including Have Gun – Will Travel, The Fugitive, Combat!, Get Smart, The Man from U.N.C.L.E., The Wild Wild West, Gilligan's Island, Kojak and The Twilight Zone (such as the episodes "Nightmare at 20,000 Feet" starring William Shatner, "The Jeopardy Room" starring Martin Landau and "From Agnes—With Love" starring Wally Cox), as well as the serial Danger Island from the children's program The Banana Splits.

In the 1990s, Donner served as executive producer of the HBO anthology horror series Tales from the Crypt, based on the EC Comics series of the same name. He directed three episodes during its run ("Dig That Cat... He's Real Gone", "The Ventriloquist's Dummy", "Showdown"), and also produced three feature film spinoffs; Demon Knight, Bordello of Blood and Ritual.

=== Film work ===
Donner's first feature film was X-15 (1961), which starred David McLean, Charles Bronson and Mary Tyler Moore. Seven years passed before he directed his next, Salt and Pepper (1968), with Sammy Davis Jr. and Peter Lawford. His breakthrough film was The Omen (1976). A supernatural horror made in the wake of the success of The Exorcist, the film stars Gregory Peck, David Warner and Lee Remick. It was the fifth-highest-grossing film of 1976.

==== Superman (1978) and Superman II (1980) ====
In 1978, Donner directed Superman: The Movie, starring Christopher Reeve in the title role. Donner approached the film with the concept of creating verisimilitude, an intuitive feeling evoked in the audience that makes the fantasy story feel real within the story's context. It was a hit worldwide, projecting Reeve to international fame. The film co-starred Margot Kidder as Lois Lane, Marlon Brando as Jor-El and Gene Hackman as archvillain Lex Luthor. At the box office, it grossed $134 million domestically.

Principal photography of Superman included filming of its first sequel, Superman II. Donner filmed most of Superman II with the expectation he would complete the sequel after the release of Superman. Despite the first film's success, Donner was fired from Superman II. Throughout the filming of both Superman films, Donner had a difficult relationship with executive producers Alexander Salkind and Ilya Salkind and producer Pierre Spengler. The Salkinds refused Donner's demand that Spengler be fired; instead, the Salkinds replaced Donner as director of Superman II with Richard Lester, who had worked with the Salkinds on The Three Musketeers and The Four Musketeers and as an uncredited producer on Superman. Following Donner's dismissal, Marlon Brando's scenes were removed from Superman II and much of the film was re-shot under Lester's direction. Gene Hackman refused to return for re-shoots; consequently, all the Lex Luthor scenes that appear in Superman II were filmed by Donner, although Donner refused to be credited.

Rotten Tomatoes' summary states that "Superman II meets, if not exceeds, the standard set by its predecessor." Donner continued to promote the view that his contribution was superior to the rest of the series. Superman II: The Richard Donner Cut was released on November 28, 2006, the same date as the DVD release of the summer film Superman Returns. This version of the film features the re-insertion of Marlon Brando's scenes as Jor-El and relies on a minimum of footage shot by Richard Lester.

==== Later work ====
He subsequently directed mixed commercial flops (Inside Moves, Radio Flyer) and successes (The Goonies, the Lethal Weapon series, Scrooged, and Conspiracy Theory).

===== Lethal Weapon series (1987–1998) =====
Donner's next blockbuster film was the action comedy Lethal Weapon, written by Shane Black. It starred Mel Gibson as a widowed narcotics detective with a suicidal bent "who breaks every rule for the sheer joy of it". It co-starred Danny Glover as a calm homicide detective with a loving family and consideration for retirement. The film's action sequences were considered "truly spectacular" and made the film one of the year's biggest hits.

Donner directed six films starring Mel Gibson in total, creating a Lethal Weapon franchise with three sequels; the last of these was Lethal Weapon 4, released in 1998. In an interview in 2000, Gibson described his impressions of Donner:

Uncle Dick. He's a great guy, just terrific. Extremely professional. He's an old veteran and has an understanding of film that is the culmination of years of experience. He's got his technical stuff down, his vision down. No matter what you say about Dick, it underrates him. He really loves what he's doing, loves working with actors, and he allows you freedom to explore all kinds of areas. "All right, kid," he'll say, and slap you on the back and let you try something, because even he doesn't know sometimes. He's just an extremely charming, talented, great fuckin' guy. I love him.

===== X-Men series =====
Donner became the executive producer for the 2000 Marvel Comics film X-Men, then also an executive producer for the 2009 X-Men prequel, X-Men Origins: Wolverine. In addition, Donner's wife has produced all of the films in the X-Men film series under their Donners' Company brand.

On October 16, 2008, Donner and Lauren Shuler Donner received stars in a double ceremony on the Hollywood Walk of Fame for their achievements in motion pictures, located at 6712 Hollywood Boulevard.

==== Unrealized projects ====
Donner was the first choice to direct the James Bond film Never Say Never Again, but turned it down after he decided he disliked Lorenzo Semple Jr.'s script. He would have served as director of Jurassic Park had Columbia/TriStar won the bidding war for the screen rights against other studios. Donner was also considered as director for The Lost Boys, The Last Boy Scout, Memoirs of an Invisible Man, Dave, Forever Young, and The Sandlot. He was to at one time have directed and executive produced an action film of Crazy Taxi, based on the popular Sega video game, for Goodman/Rosen Productions. In 2001, Donner claimed he would direct a sequel to The Goonies after Timeline, and he also planned to direct the fifth and final Lethal Weapon film before his death in 2021.

== Books ==
- Action Comics (co-writer with Geoff Johns)
- Last Son and Escape from Bizarro World (2009)
- You're the Director... You Figure It Out: The Life and Films of Richard Donner (2010)

=== Comic books ===
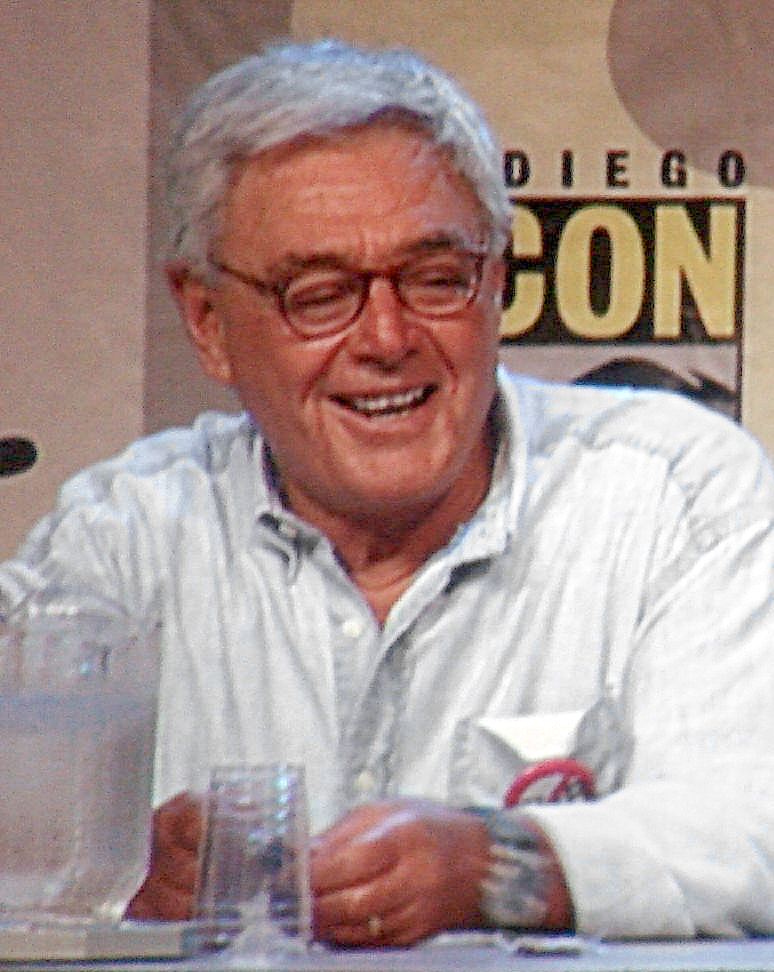
Donner at the 2006 San Diego Comic-Con

One of Donner's assistants in the late 1990s was comic book writer Geoff Johns. In October 2006, Donner, Johns, and artist Adam Kubert became the new creative team on Action Comics, the publisher's most time honored publication and one of DC Comics' two main Superman titles. Together, Johns and Donner collaborated on the stories Last Son and Escape from Bizarro World, both of which have been released in collected book form. Donner and Johns also co-wrote a story for Action Comics #1000, released in April 2018.

=== Biography ===
In 2010, Donner's authorized biography titled You're the Director... You Figure It Out: The Life and Films of Richard Donner by James Christie was published by BearManor Media. The book features a foreword by Mel Gibson.

Script Magazine described the book as an "engaging portrait of a warm-hearted (if occasionally gruff) man who can justly be considered the modern equivalent of Victor Fleming and Michael Curtiz—a highly talented, professional director of motion pictures who has thrived in the studio system and made some pretty good pictures to boot."

The Directors Guild of America called the book "a compelling study of an ebullient, ballsy risk-taker who was a director even before he was aware of it" that "ably captures Donner's joy in doing a job he loves."

== Personal life ==
Donner married film producer Lauren Shuler on November 27, 1985. The two merged their respective production companies to create Shuler-Donner Productions (now The Donners' Company) the same year. Donner and Shuler remained together until Donner's death.

Donner was a cousin of actor Steve Kahan, who played a policeman tracking Lex Luthor in Superman: The Movie, and played Captain Ed Murphy in the Lethal Weapon film franchise. Donner also cast Kahan in some of his other films.

=== Death ===
Donner died on July 5, 2021, at his home in West Hollywood, California, at the age of 91. The cause of death was heart failure with atherosclerosis as an underlying cause.

== Filmography ==
=== Film ===
Year	Title	Functioned as		Notes
Year	Title	Director	Producer	Notes
1961	X-15	Yes	No	
1968	Salt and Pepper	Yes	No	
1970	Lola	Yes	No	
1976	The Omen	Yes	No	
1978	Superman	Yes	No	
1980	Superman II	Uncredited	No	Replaced by Richard Lester during principal photography; Lester received sole directorial credit
1980	Inside Moves	Yes	No	
1982	The Toy	Yes	No	
1985	Ladyhawke	Yes	Yes	
1985	The Goonies	Yes	Yes	
1987	Lethal Weapon	Yes	Yes	
1988	Scrooged	Yes	Yes	
1989	Lethal Weapon 2	Yes	Yes	
1992	Radio Flyer	Yes	No	Replaced David Mickey Evans
1992	Lethal Weapon 3	Yes	Yes	
1994	Maverick	Yes	Yes	
1995	Assassins	Yes	Yes	
1997	Conspiracy Theory	Yes	Yes	
1998	Lethal Weapon 4	Yes	Yes	
2003	Timeline	Yes	Yes	
2006	16 Blocks	Yes	No	
2006	Superman II: The Richard Donner Cut	Yes	No	Director's cut of Superman II

==== Producer only ====
- Double Tap (1997)
- Tales from the Crypt: Ritual (2002)

==== Executive producer only ====
- Omen III: The Final Conflict (1981)
- The Lost Boys (1987)
- Delirious (1991)
- Free Willy (1993)
- Free Willy 2: The Adventure Home (1995)
- Tales from the Crypt: Demon Knight (1995)
- Tales from the Crypt: Bordello of Blood (1996)
- Free Willy 3: The Rescue (1997)
- Any Given Sunday (1999)
- X-Men (2000)
- X-Men Origins: Wolverine (2009)

=== Television ===
Year	Title	Functioned as		Notes
Year	Title	Director	Producer	Notes
1957	Men of Annapolis	No	No	Writer; 4 episodes (only screenwriting credits in career)
1960	Dick Powell's Zane Grey Theatre	Yes	No	Episode: "So Young the Save Land"
1960	The DuPont Show with June Allyson	Yes	No	Episode: "Emergency"
1960–61	Wanted Dead or Alive	Yes	No	6 episodes
1961	Letter to Loretta	Yes	No	5 episodes
1961	Route 66	Yes	No	Episode: "A Bridge Across Five Days"
1961	The Tall Man	Yes	No	2 episodes
1961	Wagon Train	Yes	No	Episode: "The Bettina May Story"
1961–62	Have Gun – Will Travel	Yes	No	5 episodes
1962	The Detectives	Yes	No	Episode: "Never the Twain"
1962	The Rifleman	Yes	No	7 episodes
1962–63	Sam Benedict	Yes	No	6 episodes
1963	The Eleventh Hour	Yes	No	2 episodes
1963	Combat!	Yes	No	Episode: "No Trumpets, No Drums"
1963	The Nurses	Yes	No	Episode: "The Helping Hand"
1963–64	The Lieutenant	Yes	No	2 episodes
1963–64	The Twilight Zone	Yes	No	6 episodes
1963–64	Mr. Novak	Yes	No	7 episodes
1964	The Travels of Jaimie McPheeters	Yes	No	Episode: "The Day of the Picnic"
1964	The Man from U.N.C.L.E.	Yes	No	4 episodes
1964–65	Gilligan's Island	Yes	No	3 episodes
1964–65	Perry Mason	Yes	No	3 episodes
1965	Twelve O'Clock High	Yes	No	4 episodes
1965	Get Smart	Yes	No	2 episodes
1966	The F.B.I.	Yes	No	Episode: "The Spy Master"
1966	The Fugitive	Yes	No	2 episodes
1966	It's About Time	Yes	No	Episode: "And Then I Wrote Happy Birthday to You"
1966	Jericho	Yes	No	Episode: "Upbeat and Underground"
1966	The Wild Wild West	Yes	No	3 episodes
1966	The Felony Squad	Yes	No	3 episodes
1968–69	The Banana Splits Adventure Hour	Yes	No	6 episodes
1971	The Interns	Yes	No	Episode: "Casualty"
1971	Sarge	Yes	No	Episode: "Psst! Wanna Buy a Dirty Picture?"
1971	Bearcats!	Yes	No	2 episodes
1971–72	Cade's County	Yes	No	3 episodes
1971–73	Cannon	Yes	No	4 episodes
1972	The Sixth Sense	Yes	No	Episode: "The House That Cried Murder"
1972	Ghost Story	Yes	No	Episode: "The Concrete Captain"
1972	Banyon	Yes	No	Episode: "The Old College Try"
1972	Ironside	Yes	No	Episode: "Who'll Cry for My Baby"
1972	The Bold Ones: The New Doctors	Yes	No	3 episodes
1973–74	Kojak	Yes	No	3 episodes
1974	The Streets of San Francisco	Yes	No	2 episodes
1974	Sons and Daughters	Yes	No	3 episodes
1974	Lucas Tanner	Yes	No	Episode: "Lucas Tanner"
1974	Petrocelli	Yes	No	Episode: "Death in High Places"
1975	Sarah T. – Portrait of a Teenage Alcoholic	Yes	No	Television film
1975	Bronk	Yes	No	2 episodes
1989–96	Tales from the Crypt	Yes	Executive	Director; 3 episodes Exec. producer; 93 episodes
1992	Two-Fisted Tales	Yes	No	Television film Segment: "Showdown"
1993–94	Tales from the Cryptkeeper	No	Executive	39 episodes
1996–97	Secrets of the Cryptkeeper's Haunted House	No	Executive	
1997	Perversions of Science	No	Executive	10 episodes
1999	Made Men	No	Yes	Television film

== Awards and nominations ==
Institution	Year	Category	Work	Result
American Cinema Editors	2009	Golden Eddie Filmmaker of the Year	—N/a	Won
CableACE Awards	1993	Best Dramatic Series	Tales from the Crypt	Nominated
CableACE Awards	1994	Best Dramatic Series	Tales from the Crypt	Nominated
CableACE Awards	1995	Best Dramatic Series	Tales from the Crypt	Nominated
Casting Society of America	2007	Career Achievement Award	—N/a	Won
Daytime Emmy Awards	1997	Outstanding Game Show	Secrets of the Cryptkeeper's Haunted House	Nominated
Director's View Film Festival	2002	Joseph L. Mankiewicz Excellence in Filmmaking Award	—N/a	Won
Hugo Awards	1979	Best Dramatic Presentation	Superman	Won
Hugo Awards	1986	Best Dramatic Presentation	Ladyhawke	Nominated
Hollywood Film Awards	2000	Outstanding Achievement in Directing	—N/a	Won
Satellite Awards	2006	Nikola Tesla Satellite Award	—N/a	Won
Saturn Awards	1979	Best Director	Superman	Nominated
Saturn Awards	2000	President's Award	—N/a	Won
Ojai Film Festival	2008	Lifetime Achievement Award	—N/a	Won

Accolades received by Donner's directed features
Year	Film	Academy Awards		BAFTA Film Awards		Golden Globe Awards	
Year	Film	Nominations	Wins	Nominations	Wins	Nominations	Wins
1976	The Omen	2	1	1		1	
1978	Superman	4	1	6	2	1	
1980	Inside Moves	1					
1985	Ladyhawke	2					
1987	Lethal Weapon	1					
1988	Scrooged	1					
1989	Lethal Weapon 2	1					
1994	Maverick	1					
Total		13	2	7	2	2	
