= The Donners' Company =

American film production company

- Logo used from 1999 to 2005.
- Formerly: Donner/Shuler-Donner Productions (1986–1999)
- Type: Private
- Industry: Film production
- Founded: 1986; 40 years ago
- Founders: Richard Donner; Lauren Shuler Donner
- Headquarters: 4000 Warner Boulevard, Burbank, California, United States
- Key people: Lauren Shuler Donner (CEO)
- Owner: Lauren Shuler Donner

The Donners' Company, formerly known as Donner/Shuler-Donner Productions, is the film production company of director Richard Donner and producer Lauren Shuler Donner, founded in 1986. It is notable for the Free Willy and X-Men franchises.

== History ==
=== Donner/Shuler-Donner Productions ===
In 1986, film producer Lauren Shuler Donner announced that she would end her production deal with The Walt Disney Studios. She announced that she would merge with Warner Bros.-based Richard Donner Productions, to create Donner/Shuler-Donner Productions, to be operating on the Warner Bros. lot in Burbank, California.

The first film released under the name was Radio Flyer, which was directed by Richard Donner, produced by Lauren, and it was released by Columbia Pictures in 1992. It flopped at the box office.

The banner made its first major success in 1993 with box office hits Dave and Free Willy. The latter's success spawned two sequels, and a television series. That year, the studio and Warner Bros. originally made a deal with Hammer Film Productions to produce remakes based on its existing UK film properties.

In 1994, the company produced its first television project, an animated adaptation of Free Willy; it aired on ABC for two seasons.

=== The Donners' Company ===
In 1999, it was announced that Donner/Shuler-Donner Productions would be renamed to the better-sounding name The Donners' Company. On April 4, 2000, it signed a deal with NBC Studios to produce shows for the NBC television network.

That same year, the company scored a major success with X-Men, which was an instant box office hit, grossing over $296.8 million worldwide.

In 2001, The Donners' Company signed a deal with Winchester Films to produce its feature films from its own.

More recently, the company was producing two X-Men series for television, including Legion on FX, and The Gifted on Fox. In 2019, the latter was cancelled months before the former concluded its third and final season.

Richard Donner died on July 5, 2021. He was 91.

== Filmography ==
=== 1990's ===
Year	Title	Director	Distributor	Notes	Budget	Gross (worldwide)
1992	Radio Flyer	Richard Donner	Columbia Pictures	first film; co-production with Stonebridge Entertainment	$35 million	$4.6 million
1993	Dave	Ivan Reitman	Warner Bros.	co-production with Northern Lights Entertainment	$28 million	$63.3 million
1993	Free Willy	Simon Wincer	Warner Bros.	co-production with Le Studio Canal+, Regency Enterprises and Alcor Films	$20 million	$153.6 million
1994	Maverick	Richard Donner	Warner Bros.	co-production with Icon Productions	$75 million	$183 million
1995	Free Willy 2: The Adventure Home	Dwight Little	Warner Bros.	as Shuler-Donner/Donner; co-production with Le Studio Canal+., Regency Enterprises and Alcor Films	$31 million	$30 million
1995	Assassins	Richard Donner	Warner Bros.	co-production with Silver Pictures	$50 million	$83.3 million
1997	Volcano	Mick Jackson	20th Century Fox	as Shuler Donner/Donner; co-production with Fox 2000 Pictures and Moritz Original	$90 million	$122.8 million
1997	Free Willy 3: The Rescue	Sam Pillsbury	Warner Bros.	as Shuler Donner/Donner; co-production with Regency Enterprises	N/A	$3.4 million
1997	Conspiracy Theory	Richard Donner	Warner Bros.	as Shuler Donner/Donner Productions; last film released under Donner/Shuler-Donner insignia; co-production with Silver Pictures	$80 million	$137 million
1998	Bulworth	Warren Beatty	20th Century Fox	uncredited; co-production with Mulholland Productions	$30 million	$29.2 million
1998	Lethal Weapon 4	Richard Donner	Warner Bros.	as DoShuDo Productions; co-production with Silver Pictures	$100–150 million	$285.4 million
1998	You've Got Mail	Nora Ephron	Warner Bros.	as Lauren Shuler Donner	$65 million	$250.8 million
1999	Any Given Sunday	Oliver Stone	Warner Bros.	first film under the branding of The Donners' Company; co-production with Ixtlan Productions	$55 million	$100.2 million

=== 2000's ===
Year	Title	Director	Distributor	Notes	Budget	Gross (worldwide)
2000	X-Men	Bryan Singer	20th Century Fox	co-production with Marvel Entertainment Group and Bad Hat Harry Productions	$75 million	$296.3 million
2001	Out Cold	The Malloys	Buena Vista Pictures	co-production with Touchstone Pictures, Spyglass Entertainment and Barber/Birnbaum	$24 million	$14.8 million
2003	Just Married	Shawn Levy	20th Century Fox	uncredited; co-production with Robert Simonds Productions	$18 million	$101.5 million
2003	X2	Bryan Singer	20th Century Fox	co-production with Marvel Enterprises and Bad Hat Harry Productions	$110 million	$407.7 million
2003	Timeline	Richard Donner	Paramount Pictures	co-production with Mutual Film Company, Cobalt Media Group and Artists Production Group	$80 million	$43.9 million
2005	Constantine	Francis Lawrence	Warner Bros. Pictures	co-production with Vertigo/DC Comics, Village Roadshow Pictures, Batfilm Productions, Weed Road Pictures, 3 Arts Entertainment and di Bonaventura Pictures	$100 million	$230.9 million
2006	16 Blocks	Richard Donner	Warner Bros. Pictures	uncredited; co-production with Alcon Entertainment, Millennium Films, Cheyenne Enterprises, Emmett/Furla Films, Equity Pictures and Nu Image Films	$55 million	$65.7 million
2006	She's the Man	Andy Fickman	Paramount Pictures	co-production with DreamWorks Pictures and Lakeshore Entertainment	$20 million	$57.2 million
2006	X-Men: The Last Stand	Brett Ratner	20th Century Fox	co-production with Marvel Entertainment, Dune Entertainment and Ingenious Film Partners	$210 million	$460.4 million
2006	Unaccompanied Minors	Paul Feig	Warner Bros. Pictures	co-production with Village Roadshow Pictures	$26 million	$21.9 million
2008	Semi-Pro	Kent Alterman	New Line Cinema	uncredited; co-production with Mosaic Media Group	$55 million	$43.9 million
2008	The Secret Life of Bees	Gina Prince-Bythewood	Fox Searchlight Pictures	co-production with Dune Entertainment and Overbrook Entertainment	$11 million	$39.9 million
2009	Hotel for Dogs	Thor Freudenthal	Paramount Pictures	co-production with DreamWorks Pictures, Nickelodeon Movies, Cold Spring Pictures and The Montecito Picture Company	$35 million	$117 million
2009	X-Men Origins: Wolverine	Gavin Hood	20th Century Fox	co-production with Marvel Entertainment, Seed Productions, Dune Entertainment and Ingenious Film Partners	$150 million	$373.1 million
2009	Cirque du Freak: The Vampire's Assistant	Paul Weitz	Universal Pictures	co-production with Relativity Media and Depth of Field	$40 million	$39.2 million

=== 2010's ===
Year	Title	Director	Distributor	Notes	Budget	Gross (worldwide)
2011	X-Men: First Class	Matthew Vaughn	20th Century Fox	co-production with Marvel Entertainment, Dune Entertainment, Ingenious Film Partners, and Bad Hat Harry	$140–160 million	$353.6 million
2013	The Wolverine	James Mangold	20th Century Fox	co-production with Marvel Entertainment	$100–132 million	$414.8 million
2014	X-Men: Days of Future Past	Bryan Singer	20th Century Fox	co-production with Marvel Entertainment, Bad Hat Harry and Simon Kinberg	$200–220 million	$747.9 million
2016	Deadpool	Tim Miller	20th Century Fox	co-production with Marvel Entertainment and Kinberg Genre	$58 million	$782.6 million
2016	X-Men: Apocalypse	Bryan Singer	20th Century Fox	co-production with Marvel Entertainment, Bad Hat Harry, Hutch Parker and Kinberg Genre	$178 million	$543.9 million
2017	Logan	James Mangold	20th Century Fox	co-production with Marvel Entertainment, Kinberg Genre and Hutch Parker	$97 million	$619 million
2018	Deadpool 2	David Leitch	20th Century Fox	uncredited; co-production with Marvel Entertainment, Kinberg Genre and Maximum Effort	$110 million	$785.8 million
2019	Dark Phoenix	Simon Kinberg	20th Century Fox	uncredited; co-production with Marvel Entertainment, Kinberg Genre and Hutch Parker	$200 million	$252.4 million

=== 2020's ===
Year	Title	Director	Distributor	Notes	Budget	Gross (worldwide)
2020	The New Mutants	Josh Boone	20th Century Studios	uncredited; co-production with Marvel Entertainment, Kinberg Genre, Sunswept Entertainment	$67–80 million	$49.2 million
2024	Deadpool & Wolverine	Shawn Levy	Walt Disney Studios Motion Pictures	uncredited; co-production with Marvel Studios, 21 Laps Entertainment and Maximum Effort	$200 million	$1.338 billion

=== Television ===
Years	Title	Creator	Network	Notes	Seasons	Episodes
1994–95	Free Willy	Patrick Loubert based on Free Willy by: Keith A. Walker; Corey Blechman developed by: Patsy Cameron; Ted Anasiti	ABC	co-production with Le Studio Canal+, Nelvana, Regency Enterprises and Warner Bros. Television	2	21
2017–19	Legion	Noah Hawley based on Legion by: Chris Claremont; Bill Sienkiewicz	FX	co-production with 26 Keys Productions, Kinberg Genre, Bad Hat Harry Productions, Marvel Television and FXP	3	27
2017–19	The Gifted	Matt Nix based on characters by: Stan Lee; Jack Kirby	Fox	co-production with Flying Glass of Milk Productions, Kinberg Genre, Bad Hat Harry Productions, Marvel Television and 20th Century Fox Television	2	29

== In development ==
=== Television ===
Title	Developer	Network	Notes
Our Time	Sarah Watson	Disney+	co-production with The Jackal Group, Amblin Television and Warner Bros. Television
