= Lauren Shuler Donner =

American film producer (born 1949)

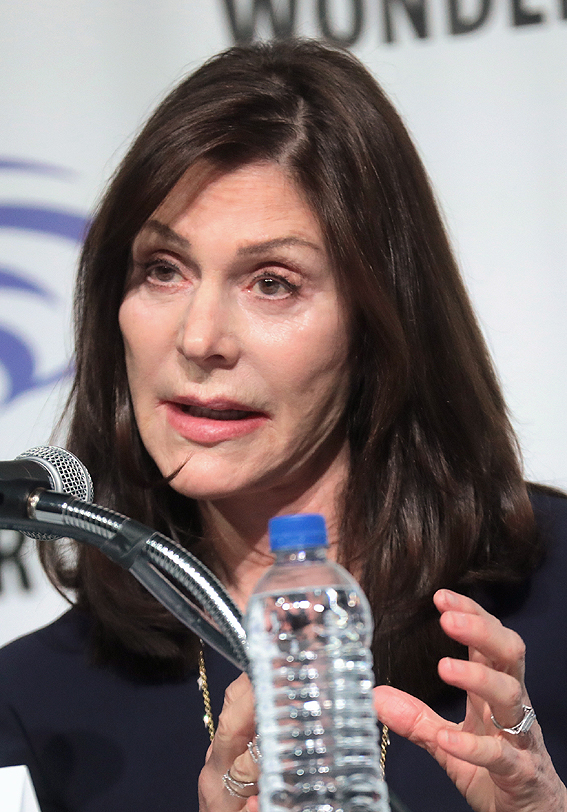
- Donner at the 2019 WonderCon
- Born: Lauren Diane Shuler; June 23, 1949 (age 77); Cleveland, Ohio, U.S.
- Education: Boston University
- Occupation: Producer
- Years active: 1978–present
- Spouses: Mark Rosenberg (m. 1980; div. 1984) Richard Donner (m. 1985; died 2021)

Lauren Diane Shuler Donner (born June 23, 1949) is an American film producer. She specializes in mainstream youth and family-oriented entertainment and owned The Donners' Company with her late husband, director Richard Donner. Her films have grossed about $5.5 billion worldwide including major contributions from the X-Men film series.

== Early life ==
Donner was born and raised in Cleveland, Ohio. She studied film at Boston University, specializing in production and editing. Following the advice of a teacher, she moved to Los Angeles in hopes of entering the entertainment industry.

== Career ==
As Donner worked in Los Angeles as an assistant editor of educational and medical films, a chance meeting at NBC headquarters led her to leave her data there. After being taught about cameras by the crew of The Tonight Show, Shuler asked NBC to work on the local news. Afterwards she freelanced on Metromedia, working on rock concert shoots, sitcoms and TV movies. Donner was a rare camerawoman in a male-dominated field, being the first woman admitted to the IATSE Electrical and Camera Guild #659.

Eventually Donner decided to work as an associate producer, in 1976 joining ABC's Wide World of Entertainment. After a traffic accident that had her hospitalized for months, Donner started working with screenwriter friends and became a creative executive/story editor on Motown Productions. Her input on the script of Thank God It's Friday (1978) led her to become an associate producer for that film. Next she made her television producing debut in 1979 with the acclaimed Amateur Night at the Dixie Bar and Grill, a television film written and directed by Joel Schumacher in the style of Robert Altman's Nashville. She got the job by directly asking NBC programming director Charles Engel.

== Feature film production career ==
While working at Motown, Donner became a personal friend of National Lampoon writer John Hughes, and convinced him to write a script that would become her feature film producing debut, the 1983 comedy hit Mr. Mom, starring Michael Keaton. The following year she persuaded Richard Donner to direct Ladyhawke, and the two fell in love, marrying a year after the film was released, 1985. She produced only two more of her husband's movies, Radio Flyer (1992), and Timeline (2003). She said their professional relationship helped her learn how to work on action films: "if I hadn't seen how he did action movies, I wouldn't have had the wherewithal to even pursue an X-Men or a Constantine." Her experience with Schumacher and Hughes led them to invite her to produce St. Elmo's Fire (1985) and Pretty in Pink (1986), both seminal films of the Brat Pack period. Donner had a particularly successful year in 1993 overseeing two solid hits: Dave, a homespun political comedy, and Free Willy, a family film about a boy and his whale. The last X-Men films Donner solo produced were X-Men: Days of Future Past and Deadpool; Simon Kinberg took over the later films so Donner could instead make the TV show Legion, with Donner only receiving producer credit due to contract terms. She produced the 2024 Marvel Studios film Deadpool & Wolverine alongside former intern and assistant Kevin Feige, star and writer Ryan Reynolds and director Shawn Levy, with Kinberg among the film's executive producers.

== Personal life ==
Donner has liberal political views and likes to work on movies that express her beliefs – Dave for politics, Free Willy for marine life and Hotel for Dogs for animal rights. She donates yearly to Canine Companions. She has served on the advisory boards of Planned Parenthood and TreePeople. She is a long time board member of LupusLA. Donner recently joined the Board of the MPTF, (Motion Picture Film Television Fund). She also supports Cedars Sinai Hospital in Los Angeles and UCLA Hospitals, as well as Boston University.

== Awards and honors ==
Donner has received a star on the Hollywood Walk of Fame in 2008. In 2006, Donner was awarded the Women in Film Crystal Award along with Jennifer Lopez and Diane Warren. She received an honorary Doctorate of Human Letters degree from Boston University in 2019 and was the Commencement Speaker for COM at Boston University. She and Richard Donner were honored by The American Cancer Society in 2006. The Donners were given The Loop Award by LupusLA in 2008. The Donners were also given a Lifetime Achievement Award from The Ojai Film Festival in November 2008. In 2013, the Donners were honored by The Women's Guild of Cedar Sinai Medical Center. In 2020, Shuler Donner was awarded The Golden Eddie by The American Cinema Editors (ACE). Her husband Richard Donner died on July 5, 2021, at the age of 91.

== Filmography ==
Producer

- Thank God It's Friday (1978) (associate producer)
- Amateur Night at the Dixie Bar and Grill (1979) (TV movie)
- Mr. Mom (1983)
- Ladyhawke (1985)
- St. Elmo's Fire (1985)
- Pretty in Pink (1986)
- Three Fugitives (1989)
- Radio Flyer (1992)
- Dave (1993)
- Free Willy (1993)
- The Favor (1994)
- Free Willy 2: The Adventure Home (1995)
- You've Got Mail (1998)
- Any Given Sunday (1999)
- X-Men (2000)
- X2 (2003)
- Timeline (2003)
- Constantine (2005)
- She's the Man (2006)
- X-Men: The Last Stand (2006)
- Unaccompanied Minors (2006)
- The Secret Life of Bees (2008)
- Hotel for Dogs (2009)
- X-Men Origins: Wolverine (2009)
- Cirque du Freak: The Vampire's Assistant (2009)
- X-Men: First Class (2011)
- The Wolverine (2013)
- X-Men: Days of Future Past (2014)
- Deadpool (2016)
- X-Men: Apocalypse (2016)
- Logan (2017)
- Deadpool 2 (2018)
- Dark Phoenix (2019)
- The New Mutants (2020)
- Deadpool & Wolverine (2024)

Executive producer

- Free Willy (1994) (TV series)
- Assassins (1995)
- Volcano (1997)
- Free Willy 3: The Rescue (1997)
- Bulworth (1998)
- Out Cold (2001)
- Just Married (2003)
- Semi-Pro (2008)
- Legion (2017–2019) (TV series)
- The Gifted (2017–2019) (TV series)

Acting credits

| Year | Title | Role | Notes |
|---|---|---|---|
| 1990 | Tales from the Crypt | Wife at Bar | Uncredited; Episode "The Ventriloquist's Dummy" |
| 1992 | Lethal Weapon 3 | Nurse | |
| 1994 | Maverick | Mrs. D. (Bathhouse Maid) | |
