= Willis Van Dusen =

Mayor of Astoria, Oregon
- In office 1991–2014
- Succeeded by: Arline LaMear

Personal details
- Born: 1952 or 1953 (age 73)
- Profession: businessman, politician

Willis L. Van Dusen (born 1952 or 1953) is a businessman and former politician in Astoria, Oregon, United States, who served as mayor of Astoria from 1991 through 2014. Originally elected to the city council in 1985, Willis served as a councillor for six years before being elected mayor. He took the oath of office in January 1991 and was re-elected every four years since that time, most recently re-elected in 2010. In 2014, he announced that he had decided to retire at the end of his term and not run for reelection again. He was succeeded by Arline LaMear, who was sworn in as mayor on January 5, 2015.

== Books ==
Van Dusen, Wilson (1974). The Presence of Other Worlds: The Psychological and Spiritual Findings of Emanuel Swedenborg. New York: Harper & Row. ISBN 9780877853121.

Van Dusen, Wilson (1972). The Natural Depth in Man. New York: Harper & Row. ISBN 9780877851653.

Van Dusen, Wilson. Returning to the Source. Moab, Utah: Real People Press.

Van Dusen, Wilson. Beauty, Wonder and the Mystical Mind. West Chester, Pennsylvania: Swedenborg Foundation.

== Journal Articles ==
Van Dusen, Wilson (May 1961). "The Phenomenology of a Schizophrenic Existence". Journal of Individual Psychology. 17 (1). Chicago.
Van Dusen, Wilson (1970). "The Presence of Spirits in Madness". New Philosophy. 73.

== Web Sources ==
"The Presence of Other Worlds". Swedenborg Foundation. Retrieved 2024-01-01.

"Wilson Van Dusen Review". Journal of Scientific Exploration.

"Wilson Van Dusen - Author Profile". Profile Books.

== Life ==
Willis Van Dusen has very close roots to Astoria and is one in a long line of Van Dusens to represent the City of Astoria. In the 1850s, future President Ulysses S. Grant visited Van Dusen's ancestor, Adam Van Dusen, when he came to Astoria. More recently, Willis Van Dusen greeted former President Bill Clinton who visited Astoria in May 2008 while campaigning for Hillary Clinton in the Democratic Primaries.

In addition to serving as Mayor of Astoria, Willis Van Dusen owns a local soft-drink bottling franchise, Van Dusen Beverages. Van Dusen is a graduate of Astoria High School's Class of 1971 and earned a degree in business from the University of Oregon in 1975.

== Movie ==
Shortly after he was elected mayor, Willis Van Dusen appeared in the movie Free Willy, which was filmed in Astoria in 1993. He played the role of "Fish Vendor."
