= Mary and Martha (film) =

2013 British-American TV movie

- Poster
- Written by: Richard Curtis
- Directed by: Phillip Noyce
- Starring: Hilary Swank; Brenda Blethyn
- Original language: English

Production
- Producers: Hilary Bevan Jones; Lisa Bruce; Genevieve Hofmeyr
- Cinematography: Roberto De Angelis
- Running time: 90 minutes

Original release
- Network: BBC One
- Release: 1 March 2013

Mary and Martha is a 2013 British-American television film starring Hilary Swank and Brenda Blethyn, and directed by Phillip Noyce. Based on a screenplay by Richard Curtis, it was produced by Working Title Television, in association with the BBC and NBCUniversal. The film had its UK premiere on 1 March 2013 on BBC One and premiered in the US on HBO on 20 April 2013. The film is based on a true story. The film centers around two mothers, one British (Blethyn, based on Malaria No More UK Special Ambassador Jo Yirrell, whose son – like the character played by Sam Claflin – was a volunteer teacher who always gave his malaria pills to his students at an African orphanage), and one American (Swank, as a fictional character, who garners most of the airtime), who share only one thing in common: the loss of their sons to malaria. After the deaths of their sons, the mothers decide to travel to Africa to help with malaria prevention. The film was nominated for the Humanitas Prize.

== Plot ==
Two very different women, Mary and Martha, who both lose their sons to malaria.

Mary is an overly protective American mother. After her young son and only child, George, is bullied by classmates, she decides to pull him out of school and take him on an extended trip to Africa because she feels she can give him a better education. Starting in South Africa, they next cross to Mozambique. While there, George is bitten by a mosquito and contracts malaria. Despite rushing him back to a South African hospital, George dies. In the midst of grieving, Mary decides to return to Africa after George's funeral where she meets Martha, a British woman whose grown son, Ben, has also just died of the same disease while working at an orphanage in Mozambique. He was a carefree young man, who would give all his malaria pills to his students. Like George, he was an only child.

The two women turn their grief into action, hoping to thwart the disease, which the World Health Organization estimates killed 660,000 people in 2010, most of them African children. In the process, Mary and Martha come to realise that the losses experienced by two comfortable white Western households are atypical, and that the real impact of malaria is on parts of the world that few people in their circles know or care about. The pair testify before a Congressional subcommittee, raising increased funding for mosquito nets and malaria pills.

== Cast ==
- Hilary Swank as Mary
- Brenda Blethyn as Martha
- Sam Claflin as Ben
- Frank Grillo as Peter
- Lux Haney-Jardine as George
- Bongo Mbutuma as Pumelele
- Ian Redford as Charles
- James Woods as Mary's father

== Reception ==
On the review aggregator website Rotten Tomatoes, 56% of 16 critics' reviews are positive, with an average rating of 5.7/10. The website's consensus reads: "Hilary Swank and Brenda Blethyn deliver moving performances in this well-intentioned drama, but rote storytelling and a shallow depiction of Africa diminishes its impact." Metacritic, which uses a weighted average, assigned the film a score of 67 out of 100, based on 9 critics, indicating "generally favorable" reviews. Brian Lowry from Variety felt that:

Mary and Martha harks back to when the service was content to tell great little stories – often with an agenda – that might not have been commercial enough to find a home elsewhere [...] Admittedly, Curtis has a rather facile view of how good can be accomplished, but in a cynical age, there's something refreshing about old-fashioned idealism, even if the movie hinges on well-intentioned Westerners bringing relief to the Third World. Part of that has to do with the intensely personal approach to the story, and the palpable anguish Swank and Blethyn convey.

Neil Genzlinger, writer for The New York Times, wrote that:

…this movie grabs for every heartstring in sight… also detracting from the story is that the movie has too much Mary and not enough Martha. So much effort goes into setting up Ms. Swank's somewhat annoying character for a fall that Ms. Blethyn's more interesting character is given short shrift. But the scenes in which the two actresses are together have some real power.

Critical with the film, The A.V. Club's Simon Abrams wrote that:

… at first, the off-the-cuff insensitivity that Mary and Martha's characters persistently exhibit seems benign enough. Mary and Martha is, after all, a made-for-TV melodrama about two mothers that bond after their respective sons die from malaria, and grief does sometimes manifest itself in strange ways. Screenwriter Richard Curtis and director Phillip Noyce do their best to, in the words of Hilary Swank's Mary, "tell you how it feels to have a personal involvement with malaria." But while Curtis makes a point of making characters show their grief by gingerly stepping on each other's toes, Mary and Martha is more of a product of unwitting creative insensitivity than an apt reflection of it.
