= Free Willy =

1993 film by Simon Wincer

- Theatrical release poster
- Directed by: Simon Wincer
- Screenplay by: Keith Walker; Corey Blechman
- Story by: Keith A. Walker
- Produced by: Jennie Lew Tugend; Lauren Shuler Donner
- Starring: Jason James Richter; Lori Petty; Jayne Atkinson; August Schellenberg; Michael Madsen
- Cinematography: Robbie Greenberg
- Edited by: O. Nicholas Brown
- Music by: Basil Poledouris
- Production companies: Le Studio Canal+; Regency Enterprises; Alcor Films; Donner/Shuler-Donner
- Distributed by: Warner Bros.
- Release date: July 16, 1993
- Running time: 112 minutes
- Country: United States
- Language: English
- Budget: $20 million
- Box office: $153.7 million

Free Willy is a 1993 American family drama film, directed by Simon Wincer, produced by Lauren Shuler Donner and Jennie Lew Tugend, written by Keith Walker and Corey Blechman from a story by Walker and distributed by Warner Bros. under their Family Entertainment label. The film stars Jason James Richter in his film debut, Lori Petty, Jayne Atkinson, August Schellenberg, and Michael Madsen with the eponymous character, Willy, played by Keiko.

The story is about a 12-year-old orphaned boy named Jesse who befriends a captive orca, Willy, at an ailing amusement park. When he discovers that the park owner has been planning to dispose of Willy, he hatches a scheme to break Willy out of captivity.

Released on July 16, 1993, the film received positive attention from critics and was a commercial success, grossing $153.7 million from a $20 million budget. It grew into a small franchise, including an animated television series, two sequels, and a direct-to-video reboot in addition to inspiring the rehabilitation and release of Keiko. The film marked Keith Walker's only film as screenwriter, and last project before his death on December 30, 1996.

== Plot ==
On the Pacific Northwest coastline, a pod of orcas is tracked down by whalers. An adolescent male orca is captured and separated from his family and sold to the Northwest Adventure Park.

Months later, Jesse, an orphan abandoned by his estranged mother six years ago, has fled from Cooperton with his fellow orphans and spends three days roaming Portland, begging for money and stealing food. To evade police in pursuit later that night, he and his friend Perry break into the adventure park's observation area, unaware that they triggered an alarm. While painting graffiti on the walls and its water tank, Jesse comes face to face with the orca before getting caught by the police. Jesse's social worker Dwight informs him that his new foster parents, Glen and Annie Greenwood, would be happy to take him in. Jesse, who hopes to be reunited with his mother, begrudgingly goes to live with them in Astoria.

To avoid being sent to juvenile hall if he flees again, Jesse is allowed to make up for his vandalism by cleaning and repainting the observation area. He forms a bond with the orca, named Willy, when he takes a liking to Jesse's harmonica playing. With probation ending, and his job almost up, Jesse sneaks out of the house to visit Willy and falls in the tank. He nearly drowns but Willy saves and brings him to the surface. Randolph and Rae, Willy's respective caretaker and trainer/veterinarian, notice that Jesse is the only human that the normally ill-tempered Willy responds to, and eventually, Jesse is offered a summer job. He also starts to warm up to the Greenwoods.

Park owner Dial sees Jesse and Willy's talent in hopes of finally making money from the orca, who has thus far been a costly venture for him. On opening day, however, he refuses to perform due to being antagonized by children in the observation area. Jesse, unable to get him to do tricks while dealing with pressure from spectators except the Greenwoods and Dwight, tearfully storms off. Willy cracks the tank with his stress-induced rage, having had enough of the children's constant banging. Jesse plans to find his mother despite Dwight affirming that she does not want him. He sneaks out to stop by the tank to say goodbye to Willy. Before leaving, something responds to Willy's calling again. Jesse follows the responses and realizes Willy is communicating with his pod. The discovery is interrupted when park manager Wade and some colleagues sneak into the observation area to deliberately damage the spot where Willy smashed the tank so that the water will leak out.

Randolph explains to Jesse that Dial plans to kill Willy and collect the $1 million in insurance money that he is worth. Jesse hatches a plan to return him to the ocean, with Randolph and Rae joining in. They use a forklift to transport Willy from the tank to Glen's pickup truck, which Jesse and Randolph stole prior. Dial launches a search when he is informed by Wade about Willy. When the truck gets stuck in the mud on Old Forest Road, Jesse uses the truck's CB radio to call Glen and Annie for help. Both of them arrive and Glen is reluctant to assist but relents when Jesse pleads with him. After a brief stop at a car wash to hydrate Willy more, Glen drives the truck to Dawson's Marina, where Dial, Wade, and their men have assembled at the gates to halt them. Glen's truck smashes through the gate and backs Willy into the water.

After a struggle with Dial's men and Wade, Willy manages to swim away, but two of Dial's whaling ships seal off the marina. Jesse runs toward the breakwater and encourages Willy to follow him and jump over. On the breakwater, Jesse recites a Haida prayer Randolph had taught him through the story of Natsilane, before giving Willy the signal to jump. Willy makes the jump over and lands in the ocean on the other side, free to return to his pod, while a dismayed Dial and Wade can only watch. Jesse thanks and hugs Glen and Annie as Willy calls out to him in the distance.

== Cast ==
- Jason James Richter as Jesse, a 12-year-old orphan
- Lori Petty as Rae Lindley, Northwest Adventure Park trainer, Willy's veterinarian and aspiring marine biologist
- Jayne Atkinson as Annie Greenwood, Jesse's foster mom and Glen's wife
- August Schellenberg as Randolph Johnson, Northwest Adventure Park caretaker
- Michael Madsen as Glen Greenwood, Jesse's foster dad and Annie's husband who's more of a rule breaker than a rule maker
- Michael Ironside as Dial, the greedy owner of Northwest Adventure Park
- Richard Riehle as Wade, Northwest Adventure Park general manager and Dial's assistant
- Mykelti Williamson as Dwight Mercer, Jesse's social worker
- Michael Bacall as Perry, a runaway orphan who also hangs with other street kids and works alongside a criminal
- Danielle Harris as Gwenie, a runaway orphan
- Isaiah Malone as Vector, a runaway orphan
- Tom Lasswell as Brody, a truck stop employee whom the Greenwoods ask about Glen's stolen pickup only to discover that he saw it carrying Willy after asking if the whale is also theirs
- Keiko as Willy, a captive 7,000 lb 12-year-old orca whom Jesse befriends

Then-Astoria mayor Willis Van Dusen made a cameo appearance as a fish vendor at the fish market Jesse goes to. Jim Michaels was the announcer for the Northwest Adventure Park's aquatic theater. Additionally, Moultrie Patten and Ed Murphy play two homeless men who pass through a car wash station where the former makes a compliment to Randolph after witnessing Willy getting hosed. Debi Derryberry was a stunt double for Jason James Richter in some scenes including Willy saving Jesse.

== Production ==
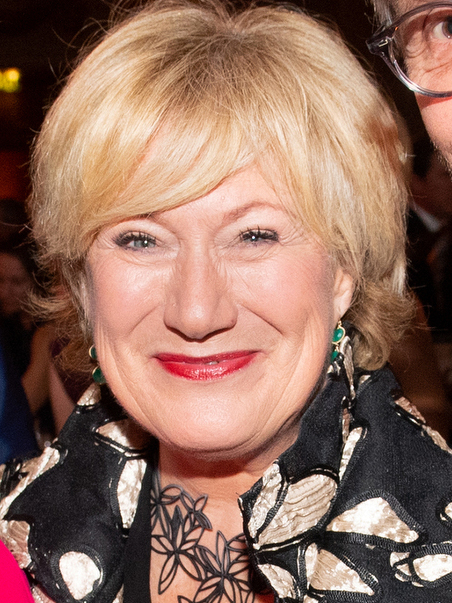
Jayne Atkinson
(Annie Greenwood)

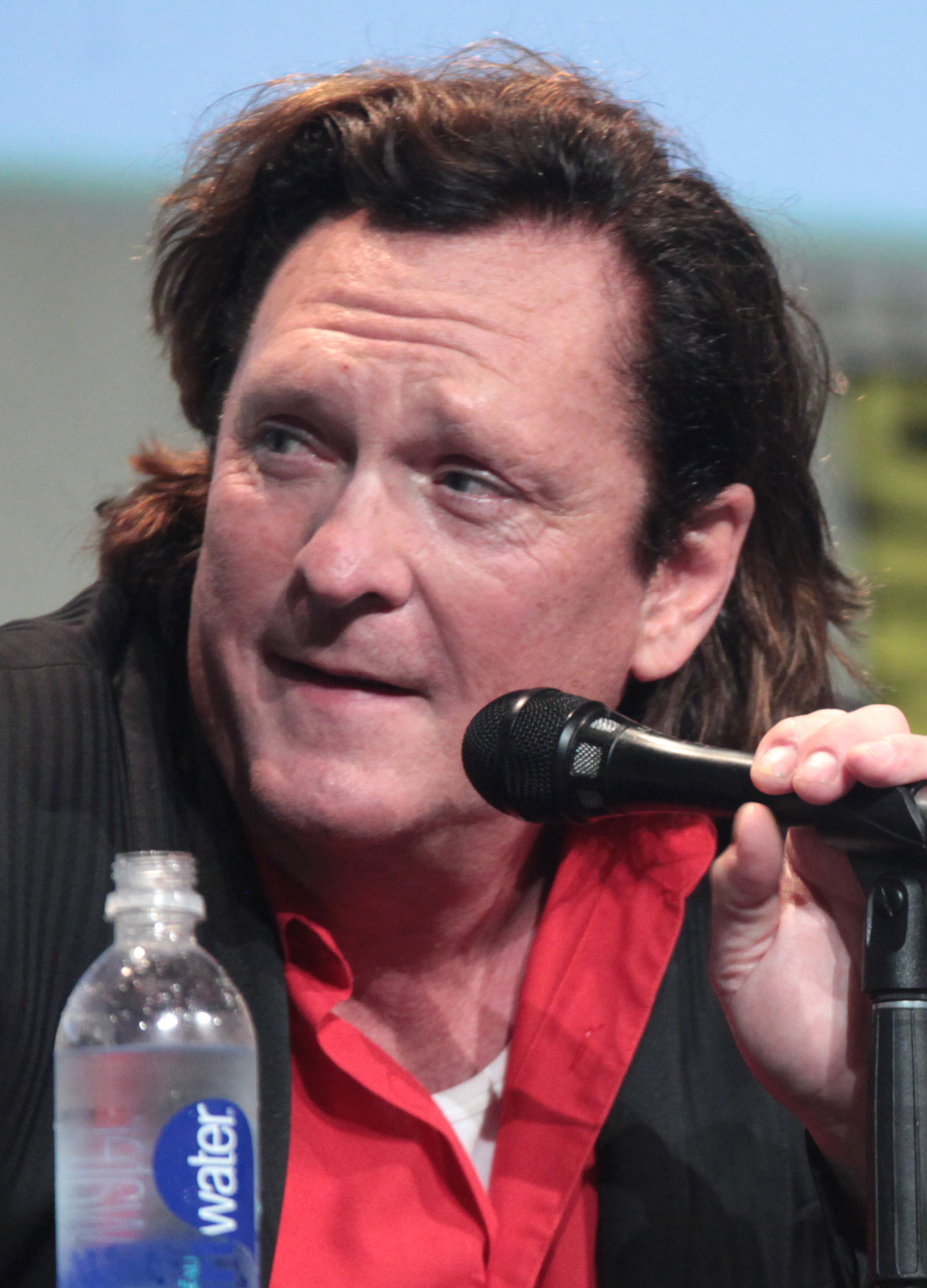
Michael Madsen
(Glen Greenwood)

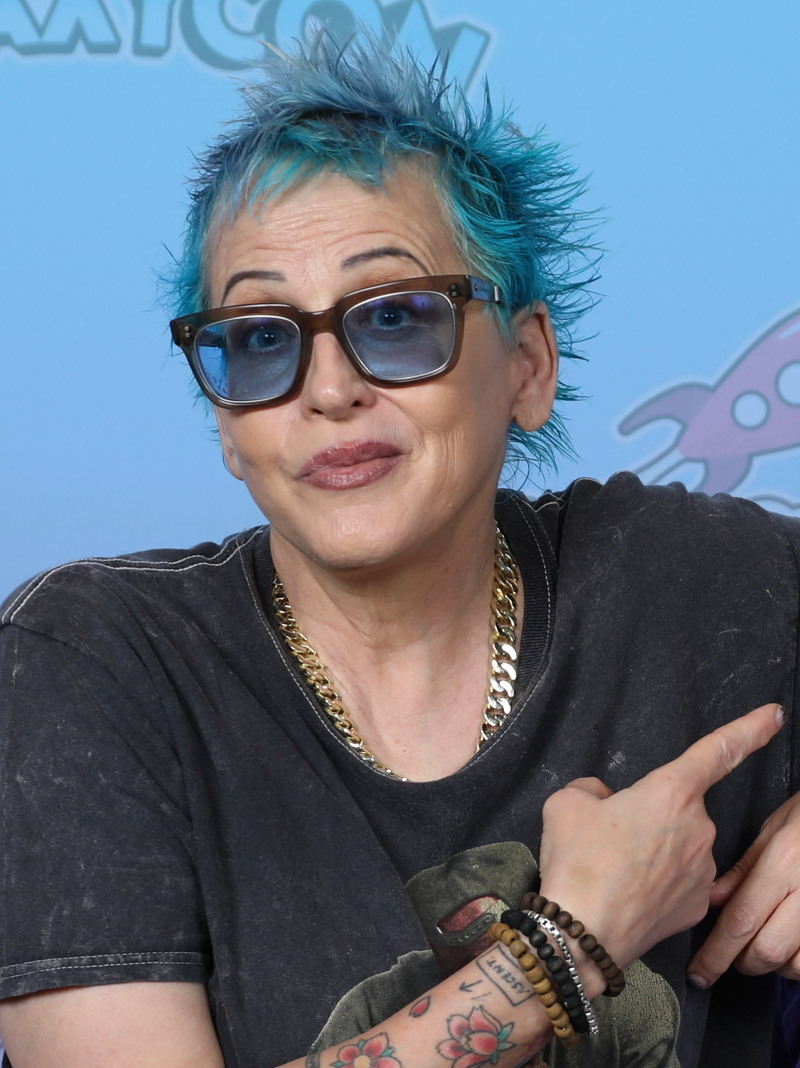
Lori Petty
(Rae Lindley)

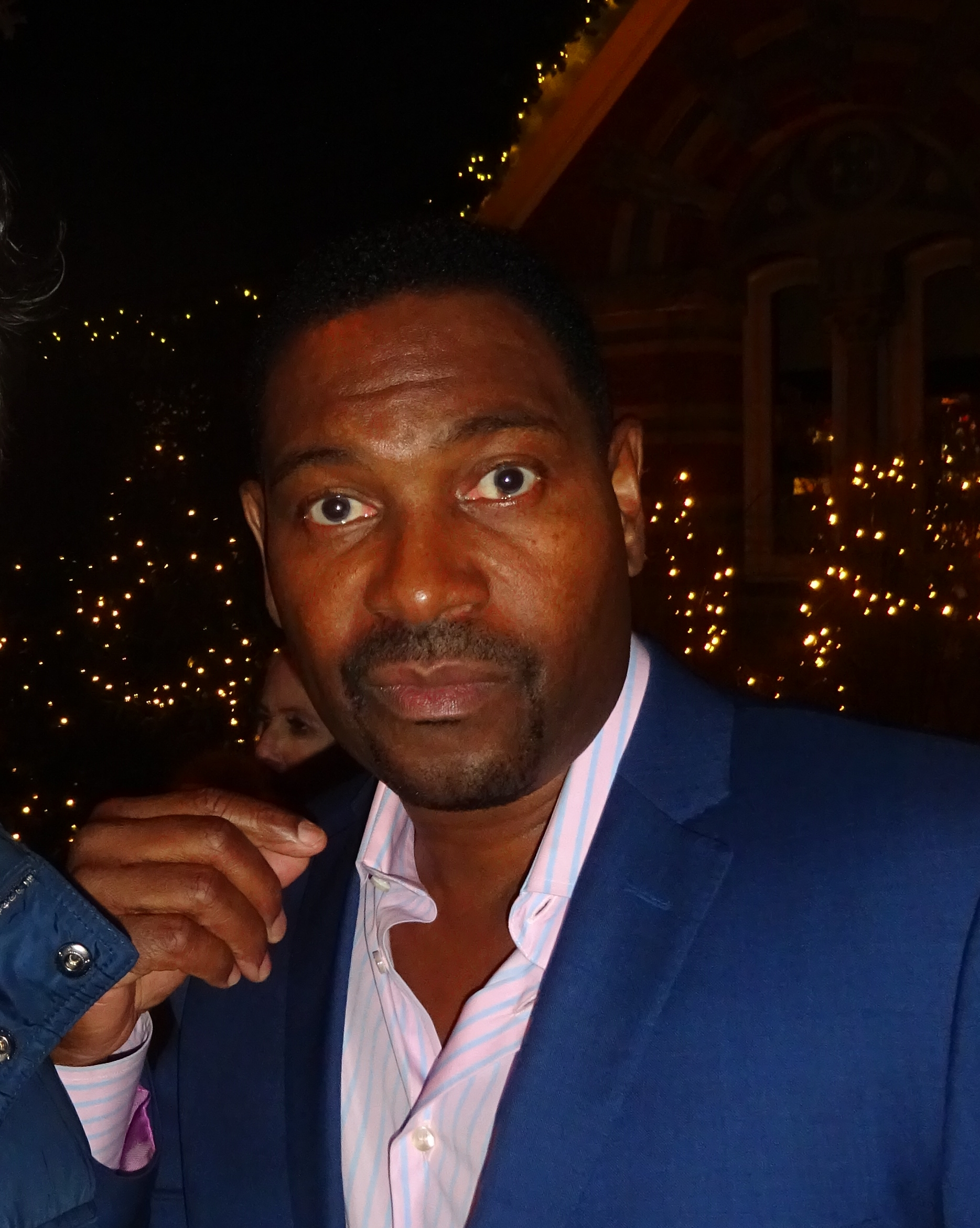
Mykelti Williamson
(Dwight Mercer)

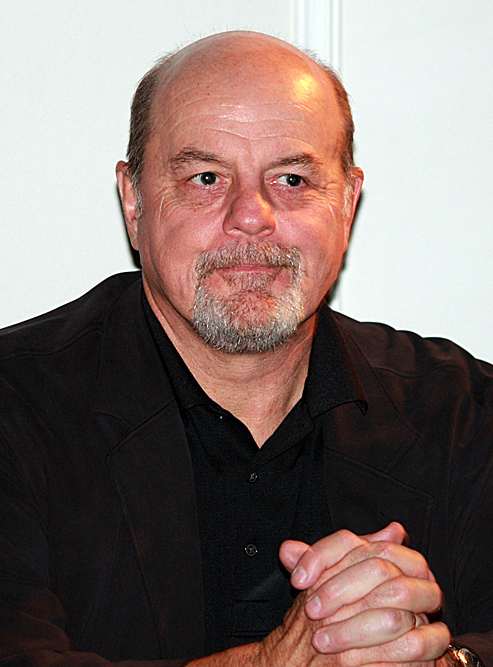
Michael Ironside
(Dial)

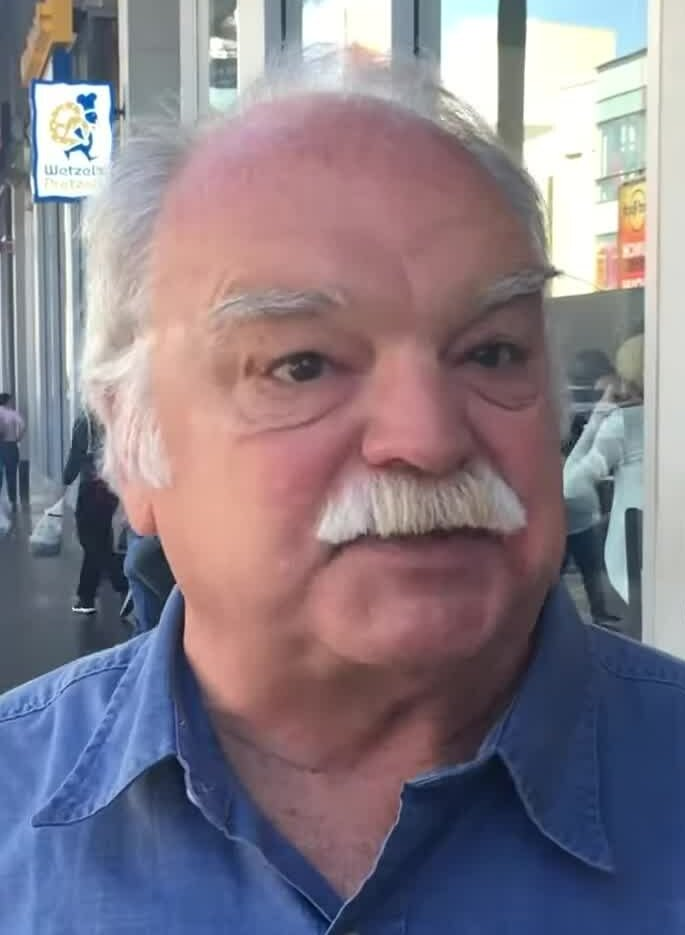
Richard Riehle
(Wade)

=== Writing ===
The project first originated in 1984 when Keith Walker conceived of the story while working on The Goonies with the film's director Richard Donner, who would eventually serve as one of the executive producers for Free Willy. In the original script, the character of Jesse was a mute 10-year-old boy living with nuns. Donner and his wife, producer Lauren Shuler Donner, hired screenwriter Corey Blechman to update the script and to make it less sentimental, including making Jesse older and into a street tough-type. Shuler Donner cited the film as part of a broader initiative to make commercial films that, while entertaining, also convey important messages.

=== Filming ===
Filmmakers searched throughout the U.S., Japan, France, Spain, and Argentina for an orca to portray Willy before settling on Keiko, a twelve-year-old orca that had been residing at Reino Aventura amusement park in Mexico City since 1985. The production team was able to film Keiko in the park while it underwent renovations from May and June 1992. A wooden backdrop was used to make the Reino Aventura aquatic arena appear as if it was located in the Pacific Northwest. Once filming concluded in Mexico City, production moved to Oregon and Washington for location shooting. Oregon locations featured in the film include Ecola State Park, Oregon Convention Center, Pioneer Courthouse Square, Morrison Bridge, 14th Street Pier, Tom McCall Waterfront Park, Burnside Skatepark and Oaks Amusement Park. The climactic jump scene takes place at the Hammond Marina in Warrenton where a rocket launcher was used to shoot the Willy animatronic out of the shoot. The final scene along with the opening and end credits featuring wildlife montages of the Southern resident orcas were shot by Bob Talbot.

Most close-up shots involving limited movement by Willy, such as when he is in the trailer and the sequences involving him swimming in the open water, make use of an animatronic stand-in. Walt Conti, who supervised the effects for the orcas, estimated that half of the shots of the orca used animatronic stand-ins. Conti stated that the smaller movements of a real orca actually made things difficult in some ways for him and his crew; they had to concentrate on smaller nuances in order to make the character seem alive. The most extensive use of CGI in the film is the climax where Willy jumps over Jesse and into the wild. All stunts with Keiko were performed by the young orca trainer Justin Sherbert (known additionally by his stage name, Justin Sherman).

Principal photography took place from May 18 to August 17, 1992.

== Release ==
=== Box office performance ===
The film was released alongside Hocus Pocus and Benefit of the Doubt on July 16, 1993, and grossed $7,868,829 domestically in its opening weekend. It went on to make $76 million in its foreign release and $11,181 from the 2021 re-release in some domestic markets, bringing the film's gross to $153,709,806. Upon its initial release, Free Willy ranked number 5 behind Hocus Pocus plus holdovers from Jurassic Park, In the Line of Fire and The Firm at the box office before moving to number 4 by the following weekend and it stayed there for two more weeks. Afterward, its rank in the box office began to gradually decline, with the exception of a three-day weekend (September 3 to 6), in which gross revenue increased by 33.6%.

=== Critical response ===
The film has received positive reviews from critics. The Rotten Tomatoes website reported that 71% of critics have given the film a fresh rating based on 31 reviews, with an average rating of 5.7/10. The site's critics consensus reads: "Free Willy tugs at the heartstrings skillfully enough to leap above the rising tide of sentimentality that threatens to drown its formulaic family-friendly story". The film on Metacritic has a weighted average score of 79 out of 100, indicating "generally favorable" reviews from 14 reviews. Audiences polled by CinemaScore gave the film an average grade of "A" on an A+ to F scale. The film received a negative review from Gene Siskel, who said he had "a problem with the whale as a creature to be loved" since "[its] eyes are so set far apart you can't even see them".

=== Accolades ===
Award	Date	Category	Recipient(s) and nominee(s)	Result	Ref.
Youth in Film Awards	February 5, 1994	Best Youth Actor Leading Role in a Motion Picture: Drama	Jason James Richter	Won^{1}	
Youth in Film Awards	February 5, 1994	Outstanding Family Motion Picture: Drama	Free Willy	Won	
Kids' Choice Awards	May 7, 1994	Favorite Film	Free Willy	Nominated	
Kids' Choice Awards	May 7, 1994	Favorite Movie Actress	Lori Petty	Nominated	
MTV Movie Awards	June 4, 1994	Breakthrough Performance	Jason James Richter	Nominated	
MTV Movie Awards	June 4, 1994	Best Kiss	Jason James Richter and Keiko	Nominated	
MTV Movie Awards	June 4, 1994	Best Song From a Movie	"Will You Be There" by Michael Jackson	Won	
BMI Film & TV Awards	1994	BMI Film Music	Basil Poledouris	Won	
Environmental Media Awards	1994	Feature Film	Free Willy	Won	
Genesis Awards	1994	Feature Film	Free Willy	Won	
Golden Screen Awards	1994	Golden Screen	Free Willy	Won	
Notes: ^1 — Tied with Edward Furlong for A Home of Our Own.

=== Home media ===
Free Willy sold almost 9 million units on videocassette following its release on December 11, 1993. The original VHS, 10th Anniversary DVD, and Blu-ray releases also had a music video of the Michael Jackson song, "Will You Be There".

== Soundtrack ==
Free Willy: Original Motion Picture Soundtrack

Soundtrack album by various artists
- Released: July 13, 1993
- Length: 59:26
- Labels: MJJ Music; Epic Soundtrax
- Producers: Joel Sill; Gary LeMel; Jerry Greenberg

Singles from Free Willy: Original Motion Picture Soundtrack
- 1. "Will You Be There" Released: June 28, 1993; 2. "Right Here (Human Nature Remix)" Released: July 9, 1993

Professional ratings
Review scores
Source	Rating
AllMusic	2/5 stars

The Free Willy film soundtrack was released on July 13, 1993, on CD and audio cassette by MJJ Music in association with the Epic Records sub-label Epic Soundtrax. It contained all the songs that were featured in the film. Michael Jackson wrote, produced and performed "Will You Be There", taken from his 1991 album Dangerous, which can be heard during the end credits (without the orchestral prelude and interlude). The single version, under the title "Will You Be There (Reprise)", is also included. The song went on to become a top 10 hit in the Billboard Hot 100 charts and was certified platinum as well as winning the 1994 MTV Movie Award for Best Song from a Movie. A remix of SWV's 1992 song "Right Here", which contained a sample of Jackson's "Human Nature", became the group's highest charted single to date and the second biggest hit off the soundtrack when it also landed in the Hot 100 chart at No. 2. New Kids on the Block recorded their first song since they briefly changed their name to NKOTB.

=== Track listing ===
No.	Title	Writer(s)	Artist	Length
1.	"Will You Be There (Theme from Free Willy)"	Michael Jackson	Michael Jackson	5:53
2.	"Keep on Smilin'"	Narada Michael Walden; Sylvester Jackson; Sally Jo Dakota	NKOTB	4:36
3.	"Didn't Mean to Hurt You"	Taj Jackson; Taryll Jackson; T.J. Jackson	3T	5:47
4.	"Right Here" (Human Nature Remix)	Brian Morgan; John Bettis; Steve Porcaro	SWV	3:50
5.	"How Can You Leave Me Now"	Paul Frazier	Funky Poets	5:43
6.	"Main Title"		Basil Poledouris	5:07
7.	"Connection"		Basil Poledouris	1:44
8.	"The Gifts"		Basil Poledouris	5:19
9.	"Friends Montage"		Basil Poledouris	3:40
10.	"Auditon"		Basil Poledouris	2:04
11.	"Farewell Suite: a. "Jesse Says Goodbye" – 3:37; b. "Let's Free Willy!" – 3:35; c. "Return to Freedom" – 4:49"		Basil Poledouris	12:01
12.	"Will You Be There" (Reprise)	Michael Jackson	Michael Jackson	3:42
Total length:				59:26

== Keiko ==
The aquatic star of the film was an orca named Keiko. The huge national and international success of this film inspired a letter writing campaign to get Keiko released from his captivity as an attraction in the amusement park Reino Aventura in Mexico City; this movement was called "Free Keiko". Warner Bros. was so grateful for the whale, and so moved by the fans' ambition, they contributed to rehabilitate and (if possible) free Keiko. He was moved to The Oregon Coast Aquarium in Oregon by flying in a UPS C-130 cargo plane. In Oregon, he was returned to health with the hopes of being able to return to the wild. In 1998, Keiko was moved to Iceland via a US Air Force C-17 to learn to live in the wild. After working with handlers, he was released from a sea pen in the summer of 2002 and swam to Norway following a pod of wild orcas.

His subsequent return to humans for food and for company, and his inability to integrate with a pod of orcas confirms that the project had failed according to a scientific study published in the journal Marine Mammal Science (July 2009). Keiko eventually died of pneumonia exacerbated by a deformed fin in a Norwegian bay on December 12, 2003.

A decade later in 2013, The New York Times video reviewed Keiko's release into the wild. Reasons cited for Keiko's failure to adapt include his early age at capture, the long history of captivity, prolonged lack of contact with other orcas, and strong bonds with humans.

== Future ==
In July 2026, a reboot of Free Willy from Warner Bros. and AGBO entered development with Anthony & Joe Russo serving as executive producers, and Lauren Shuler Donner returning as co-producer. Mary-Margaret Kunze and Jade Halley Bartlett are tapped to write the screenplay.
