= Steve Kahan =

American actor (1939–2019)

- Born: Stephen Samuel Kahan; August 6, 1939; New York City, New York, U.S.
- Died: August 4, 2019 (aged 79); Sherman Oaks, Los Angeles, California, U.S.
- Occupation: Actor
- Years active: 1978–2006

Stephen Samuel Kahan (August 6, 1939 – August 4, 2019) was an American character actor, best known for playing Captain Ed Murphy in the Lethal Weapon film series (1987–1998).

== Life and career ==
Kahan appeared in many films, most prominently those of director Richard Donner, his late cousin. His best-known film role is in the Lethal Weapon film franchise as Capt. Ed Murphy. His first feature film role was in Donner's Superman (1978) as Armus, a detective tracking Lex Luthor's activity. The character was named after Burton Armus, a technical advisor who worked on the television show Kojak with Donner.

== Death ==
Kahan's last acting role was in 16 Blocks (2006). Kahan died on August 4, 2019, aged 79.

== Filmography ==
Year	Title	Role	Notes
1978	Superman	Armus, police detective (Metropolis)	
1980	Inside Moves	Burt	
1982	The Toy	State Trooper	
1987	Lethal Weapon	Capt. Ed Murphy	
1988	Scrooged	Technician	
1989	Lethal Weapon 2	Capt. Ed Murphy	
1990	Predator 2	Sergeant Neal Reeger	
1992	Radio Flyer	Coffee Shop Manager	
1992	Dead On: Relentless II	Ibsen	
1992	Lethal Weapon 3	Capt. Ed Murphy	
1993	Warlock: The Armageddon	Will Travis	
1993	Demolition Man	Captain Healy	
1994	The Favor	Helpful Fisherman	
1994	Maverick	Dealer	
1995	Free Willy 2: The Adventure Home	Captain Nilson	
1995	Assassins	Alan Branch	
1997	Conspiracy Theory	Mr. Wilson	
1998	Lethal Weapon 4	Capt. Ed Murphy	
2001	Out Cold	Powder Room Bartender	
2003	Timeline	Baker	
2006	16 Blocks	Restaurant Owner	
