= Free Willy: Escape from Pirate's Cove =

- DVD cover
- Directed by: Will Geiger
- Screenplay by: Will Geiger
- Story by: Cindy McCreery
- Based on: Characters by Keith Walker
- Produced by: John Stainton; Laura Lodin
- Starring: Bindi Irwin; Beau Bridges
- Cinematography: Robert Malpage
- Edited by: Sabrina Plisco
- Music by: Enis Rotthoff
- Production companies: ApolloMovie Beteiligungs; Film Africa Worldwide
- Distributed by: Warner Bros. Pictures (Note: Released under the Warner Premiere label.)
- Release dates: March 11, 2010 (Hungary); March 23, 2010 (United States)
- Running time: 101 minutes
- Country: United States
- Language: English

Free Willy: Escape from Pirate's Cove is a 2010 American family film written and directed by Will Geiger with the story by Cindy McCreery. It is a reboot as well as the fourth installment in the Free Willy franchise. It stars Bindi Irwin, in her film debut, and Beau Bridges. The film was released on DVD and Blu-ray on 23 March 2010 in the United States, and on 2 August in the United Kingdom and Ireland.

It is the only film in the series not to feature any cast members from the first three installments, and the only film to be released direct-to-video. Like the two previous films, Willy is not portrayed by a real killer whale, and is instead portrayed by a combination of animatronic and CGI.

== Plot ==
Australian girl Kirra Grisby is sent to stay with her grandfather Gus, in his run-down amusement park in Cape Town, South Africa, when her father is hospitalized. Upon arrival, she is met at the airport by Mansa, one of Gus' employees, and she makes friends with a Xhosa boy named Sifiso.

After a fierce storm, a male orca calf is separated from his pod and becomes stranded in a lagoon on Gus' property. Kirra discovers the animal and names him Willy. He then becomes a big hit amongst the park visitors.

Gus' competitor Rolf Woods learns about the new attraction at Gus' park and offers to buy Willy for $500,000, but no deal is made. Kirra persuades Gus to call the marine rescue people for help in rehabilitating Willy back into the sea, but Willy has under-developed echolocation skills and is unable to survive without his pod, thus making him unsuitable for rehabilitation. Kirra research how to train Willy to use his echolocation, despite being told that there is no known method to do so.

Kirra camps out by the lagoon, where Willy pulls her into the water and lets her ride him. In this way, they become a double act at the park, attracting many reporters and cameramen. The money the act earns pays for the fish needed for Willy's echolocation training. After many tries, Willy learns to use his echolocation and catches live fish swimming in the lagoon. Faced with a mounting food bill, Gus agrees to sell Willy to Rolf and insists that the exchange take place after Kirra's departure.

One day, Sifiso invites Kirra to go to his uncle Rudy's safari park. On their way back, they see a billboard advertising Willy as a new attraction at Rolf's theme park. The pair find that Gus has already signed the agreement to sell Willy. Kirra is heartbroken and makes Gus promise to make sure that Rolf takes good care of Willy. Later, when Kirra goes to the lagoon, she sees Willy's pod, but Gus does not believe her.

Kirra and Sifiso seek Uncle Rudy's help with their plan to put Willy back into the ocean. Unable to find him, the two steal a crane truck and drive it back to Pirate's Cove. Gus agrees to help them return Willy to the ocean if his pod can be found. Kirra and Sifiso then head for the harbor with Willy while Gus and Mansa stay to distract Rolf by making a fake Willy out of a porpoise model from the mini golf course. Eventually they find Willy's family, and Willy is reunited with them.

Kirra is next seen saying goodbye to Mansa and Sifiso before she leaves for the airport back to Australia, promising to come back next summer. Meanwhile, Willy and his pod swim into the ocean depths.

== Cast ==
- Bindi Irwin as Kirra
- Beau Bridges as Gus Grisby
- Bongolethu Mbutuma as Mansa
- Siyabulela Ramba as Sifiso
- Stephen Jennings as Rolf V.D. Woods
- Matthew Roberts as Blikkie
- Heima Jaffa as Jayce
- Kevin Otto as Dr. Sam Cooper
- Louw Venter as Diff
- Darron Meyer as Doctor
- Getmore Sithole as Uncle Rudy
- Robert Irwin as Pirate Boy (uncredited)
