= Cliff Eidelman =

American composer and conductor

- Born: Clifford Glen Eidelman; December 5, 1964 (age 60); Los Angeles, California, United States
- Occupation(s): Composer, conductor
- Website: www.cliffeidelman.com

Clifford Glen Eidelman (born December 5, 1964) is an American composer and conductor who has scored films including Star Trek VI: The Undiscovered Country, Free Willy 3: The Rescue, and Christopher Columbus: The Discovery.

== Career ==
Eidelman began his formal training in violin at the age of eight and continued with multi-instrument training ranging from piano and guitar in genres such as jazz to classic music in his youth. After studying music at Santa Monica College and the University of Southern California, he scored his first feature film Magdalene in 1989.

His breakthrough composition was the 1991 score to Star Trek VI: The Undiscovered Country.

In the years after, Eidelman continued to compose dramatic and epic scores such as Christopher Columbus: The Discovery. As Eidelman's style of composing changed towards more sentimental and minimalistic scores, so did the films for which he scored.

Eidelman currently resides in Santa Monica, California and continues to score movies.

== Notable scores (concert music) ==
- Symphony No. 2 First recording performed by the Royal Scottish National Orchestra. Conducted by Cliff Eidelman (2024)
- Bridges: For solo Piano (2021)
- The Five Tales for Solo Piano (2019)
- Night in the Gallery for Chamber Ensemble (released 2019) (performed and recorded by Members of the London Symphony Orchestra)
- Symphony for Orchestra and Two Pianos (released 2018) (performed and recorded by the London Symphony Orchestra)
- Wedding in the Night Garden (2000) (performed by the Los Angeles Master Chorale)
- The Tempest (1997) (recorded by the Royal Scottish National Orchestra)

| Year | Title | Director(s) | Studio(s) | Notes |
|---|---|---|---|---|
| 1988 | Magdalene | Monica Teuber | TAT FILM GmbH | |
| 1989 | Dead Man Out | Richard Pearce | HBO | Television film |
| 1989 | To Die For | Deran Sarafian | Academy Entertainment | |
| 1989 | Animal Behavior | Kjehl Rasmussen; H. Anne Riley | Millimeter Films | |
| 1989 | Triumph of the Spirit | Robert M. Young | Triumph Films | |
| 1989 | The Final Days | Richard Pearce | ABC | Television mini-series about Watergate Scandal |
| 1990 | Strike It Rich | James Scott | Miramax Films | Themes only; score by Shirley Walker |
| 1990 | Crazy People | Tony Bill | Paramount Pictures | |
| 1990 | Judgment | Tom Topor | HBO | Television film |
| 1991 | Delirious | Tom Mankiewicz | Metro-Goldwyn-Mayer | |
| 1991 | Star Trek VI: The Undiscovered Country | Nicholas Meyer | Paramount Pictures | |
| 1991 | Tales from the Crypt | Elliot Silverstein | HBO | Episode: "The Reluctant Vampire" |
| 1992 | Christopher Columbus: The Discovery | John Glen | Warner Bros. Pictures | |
| 1992 | Leap of Faith | Richard Pearce | Paramount Pictures | |
| 1993 | Untamed Heart | Tony Bill | Metro-Goldwyn-Mayer | |
| 1993 | The Meteor Man | Robert Townsend | Metro-Goldwyn-Mayer | |
| 1994 | My Girl 2 | Howard Zieff | Columbia Pictures | |
| 1994 | A Simple Twist of Fate | Gillies MacKinnon | Touchstone Pictures | |
| 1995 | Now and Then | Lesli Linka Glatter | New Line Cinema | |
| 1996 | If These Walls Could Talk | Nancy Savoca | HBO | Television film |
| 1997 | The Beautician and the Beast | Ken Kwapis | Paramount Pictures | |
| 1997 | Free Willy 3: The Rescue | Sam Pillsbury | Warner Bros. Family Entertainment | |
| 1998 | Montana | Jennifer Leitzes | Initial Entertainment Group | |
| 1998 | One True Thing | Carl Franklin | Universal Pictures | |
| 1999 | Witness Protection | Richard Pearce | HBO | Television film |
| 2000 | Ocean Men | Bob Talbot | | Theatrical IMAX Film |
| 2001 | An American Rhapsody | Éva Gárdos | Paramount Classics | |
| 2002 | Harrison's Flowers | Elie Chouraqui | Universal Pictures | USA version |
| 2003 | The Lizzie McGuire Movie | Jim Fall | Walt Disney Pictures | |
| 2004 | Sexual Life | Ken Kwapis | Showtime Independent Films | |
| 2005 | The Sisterhood of the Traveling Pants | Ken Kwapis | Warner Bros. Pictures | |
| 2006 | Open Window | Mia Goldman | Image Entertainment | |
| 2009 | He's Just Not That into You | Ken Kwapis | New Line Cinema | |
| 2012 | Big Miracle | Ken Kwapis | Universal Pictures | |
| 2018 | Being Dolphin 4D | Bob Talbot | SimEx-Iwerks | |
