= John Mattson =

American screenwriter and author

John Mattson is an American screenwriter and author. His screenplay for the film Milk Money sold to Paramount Pictures for an outright purchase of $1.1 million after Paramount topped a $1 million bid from Dino De Laurentiis Communications. He is the co-writer of Free Willy 2: The Adventure Home (for which he won the 1996 Environmental Media Award) and Free Willy 3: The Rescue. His story "Figure and Ground" won the 2018 R. N. Kinder Prize for Realistic Fiction, and was published by Pleiades in 2019. His story "Eric Clapton's Girlfriend" won the 2019 Los Angeles Review Literary Award for Flash Fiction.

He teaches in the screenwriting program at Chapman University.

== Filmography ==
- Milk Money (1994)
- Free Willy 2: The Adventure Home (with Corey Blechman and Karen Janszen) (1995)
- Free Willy 3: The Rescue (1997)
