= Bongo Mbutuma =

South African actor

- Born: Cape Town, South Africa
- Education: South African College Schools; CityVarsity School of Media and Creative Arts
- Occupation: Actor
- Years active: 2003–present
- Height: 1.76 m (5 ft 9 in)

Bongo Mbutuma is a South African actor. He appeared in the serial Troy: Fall of a City and the movies District 9 and Mary and Martha.

== Personal life ==
In 1999, he graduated from South African College Schools (SACS) High School in Cape Town. Then he attended CityVarsity, completing a course in Film and Television Production in 2001.

== Career ==
Mbutuma appeared in a commercial for Momentum Life, which became very popular. In the commercial, he played a man who gets a car salesman to test drive a new car for him, while he sits in the back seat reading a newspaper.

In 2003 he joined the Gregg Watt Interactive Actors Workshop for further studies in cinema. Then in 2004, he received a contract with Arepp: Theatre For Life, where he travelled to schools with educational drama projects. After the contract, he made his first guest role on television, in the sci-fi series Charlie Jade. In 2005, he played several guest appearance in the serials Interrogation Room, Going Up Again and Laugh Out Loud. Then he appeared in the feature film Unrequited Love, which made his cinema debut.

In 2006, he played a minor role as a hospital gate guard in the international drama series ER. In 2007, he received his first television leading role in the SABC1 drama series Divers Down. In the serial, he played the role as Bafana. In the meantime, he received several television commercials for Joko Tea, Momentum, BP and Nedbank. In 2010, he became the television host for the first season of the e.tv technology magazine show The Tech Report.

In 2014, he played a supporting role Detective Songezo Sibanda in the eKasi+ and e.tv detective drama series Traffic!.

== Filmography ==
Year	Film	Role	Genre	Ref.
2005	Charlie Jade	Corporal	TV Series	
2006	ER	Hospital Gate Guard	TV Series	
2008	Starship Troopers 3: Marauder	Sheepish Trooper	Home movie	
2009	Stürme in Afrika	Bwami	TV Movie	
2009	30 Karat Liebe	Sam	TV Movie	
2009	District 9	Nigerian Gangster	Film	
2010	Free Willy: Escape from Pirate's Cove	Mansa	Film (credited as Bongolethu Mbutuma)	
2010	Silent Witness	Kudzai's guest	TV Series	
2010	'Master Harold' ... And the Boys	Elias	Film	
2011	Outcasts	XP Hartson	TV Mini-Series	
2011	Heart & Soul	Hamilton Naki	Short film	
2013	Mary and Martha	Pumelele	TV Movie	
2017	Kilimandscharo – Reise ins Leben	Joseph	TV Movie	
2018	Troy: Fall of a City	Young Troy Hostage No. 2	TV Series	
2019	Die Spreeus	Mkhize	TV Series	
2020	Vagrant Queen	Volun / Young Volun	TV Series	
