= Free Willy 2: The Adventure Home =

- Theatrical release poster
- Directed by: Dwight Little
- Written by: Karen Janszen; Corey Blechman; John Mattson
- Based on: Characters by Keith Walker
- Produced by: Lauren Shuler Donner; Jennie Lew Tugend
- Starring: Jason James Richter; August Schellenberg; Jayne Atkinson; Jon Tenney; Elizabeth Peña; Michael Madsen
- Cinematography: László Kovács
- Edited by: Robert Brown; Dallas Puett
- Music by: Basil Poledouris
- Production companies: Le Studio Canal+ Regency Enterprises; Alcor Films; Shuler-Donner/Donner
- Distributed by: Warner Bros.
- Release date: July 19, 1995
- Running time: 98 minutes
- Country: United States
- Language: English
- Budget: $31 million
- Box office: $68 million

Free Willy 2: The Adventure Home (also known as Free Willy 2) is a 1995 American family film directed by Dwight Little from a screenplay by Karen Janszen, Corey Blechman and John Mattson. It is the sequel to the 1993 film Free Willy and second installment in the Free Willy film series distributed by Warner Bros. under their Warner Bros. Family Entertainment label. Jason James Richter, Jayne Atkinson, August Schellenberg, Michael Madsen and Mykelti Williamson reprise their roles from the first film. New cast members include Jon Tenney and Elizabeth Peña.

Set two years after Jesse freed his orca friend Willy, who has now been reunited with his family, the plot follows Jesse in a race against time after an oil spill separates Willy and his siblings from their mother. It is up to Jesse to get them back home before the oil traps them in the cove for good. Unlike the previous film where Keiko played Willy, a robotic double created by Edge Innovations was used to play the eponymous whale. The film received mixed reviews from critics and despite underperforming at the box office, a third film, Free Willy 3: The Rescue, was subsequently released in 1997.

== Plot ==
It has been two years since Jesse freed Willy and got him back home to his pod. The Greenwoods are planning a trip to the San Juan Islands to visit Randolph's new job while camping at Camp Nor' Wester. Before they leave, Dwight arrives with news that Jesse's mother was found dead in New York City and left behind another son. This devastates Jesse after many attempts at finding her, but he comes to terms with it, after talking his feelings out with Glen. Jesse's half-brother Elvis is morose, overly talkative and mischievous. He is also prone to telling lies and easily gets on Jesse's nerves. To make matters worse for Jesse, Elvis is invited along on their trip, so that they can get to know each other. At the environmental institute, Jesse reunites with Randolph, receives a pendant resembling Nastilane riding an orca, becomes smitten with his goddaughter, Nadine, and is introduced to Willy's family during a day of whale watching. He tracks and later reunites with Willy.

As the Greenwoods continue to enjoy their camping trip, Liberian oil tanker, the Dakar, runs aground on Lawson Reef and spills oil due to an engine malfunction, trapping Willy and his siblings Luna and Littlespot at the campsite. Luna gets oil in her lungs and beaches herself. Jesse and the adults get her back in the water but need further assistance. Benbrook Oil CEO John Milner announces a plan to move the whales into captivity until further notice. Jesse challenges this, making him promise to do whatever he can to get them back to their mother, Catspaw, or else he'll be blamed for Luna's death. Luna's condition worsens after Kate Haley treats her. Jesse and Randolph use an old Indian remedy that helps her recover.

At a donut shop, Elvis, who ran away yesterday after Jesse, Glen and Annie denied help which in-turn caused Annie to accidentally break her promise in allowing him to contribute more, overhears John and Wilcox's real plan to sell the whales and lock them up. With the oil spill reaching dangerous proximity to the cove, Benbrook Oil and the whalers boom it off despite Jesse, Randolph, and Nadine's objections and begin extracting the whales. Elvis rushes back to camp to warn Jesse and Nadine. They confront John, and he and his assistant are knocked into the water for going back on his promise. Willy rescues Littlespot from the extraction. Jesse hijacks the Little Dipper, to lead the whales to safety. On Jesse's signal, Willy breaks the boom and leads his siblings away. The Dakar explodes due to fuel vapors igniting after engineers try to start the generator, resulting in the crude oil catching fire.

Randolph picks up Glen and Annie, who located Elvis while returning from their unsuccessful search for him, and they follow the kids' path as Randolph sends a distress call. The whales swim under the flaming oil to safety, but the kids fall into danger when they head into another cove. The fogginess from the smoke causes Jesse to hit a rock, and the Little Dipper begins to sink while the flames seal off the cove. A search and rescue helicopter locates them, pulling Elvis and Nadine to safety, but Jesse slips out of the harness and the helicopter is forced to leave him behind due to smoke choking the engine. Jesse nearly drowns, but Willy returns for his friend and carries him safely under the fire in time for the adults to retrieve Jesse. Though Jesse is curious as to why Willy hasn't left, Randolph reveals the signal must be performed. Jesse does it and he, Glen, and Annie say goodbye to Willy.

Shortly after the Coastal Marine Patrol deliver Elvis and Nadine, Elvis gives Jesse a taped old photograph of Jesse and their mother. He reveals that she talked about Jesse all the time and felt bad about abandoning him. Jesse thanks him and is able to make peace with what happened with his mom. Glen approves Annie's proposal of adopting Elvis. When asked by Elvis how he knows the whales' whereabouts, Jesse clutches his necklace and replies, "I know". He then recites Nastilane's Haida prayer as Willy, Luna and Littlespot reunite with Catspaw.

== Cast ==
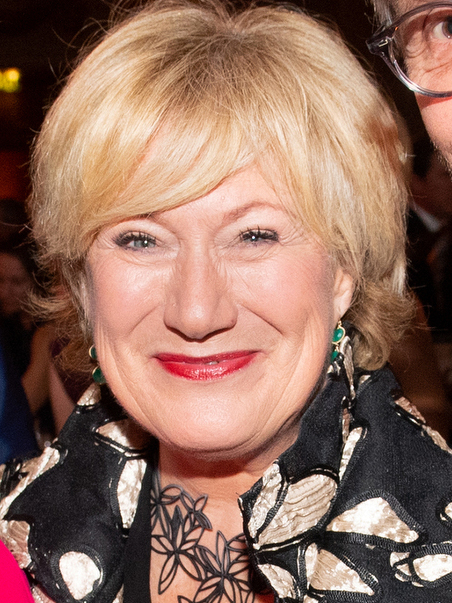
Jayne Atkinson
(Annie Greenwood)

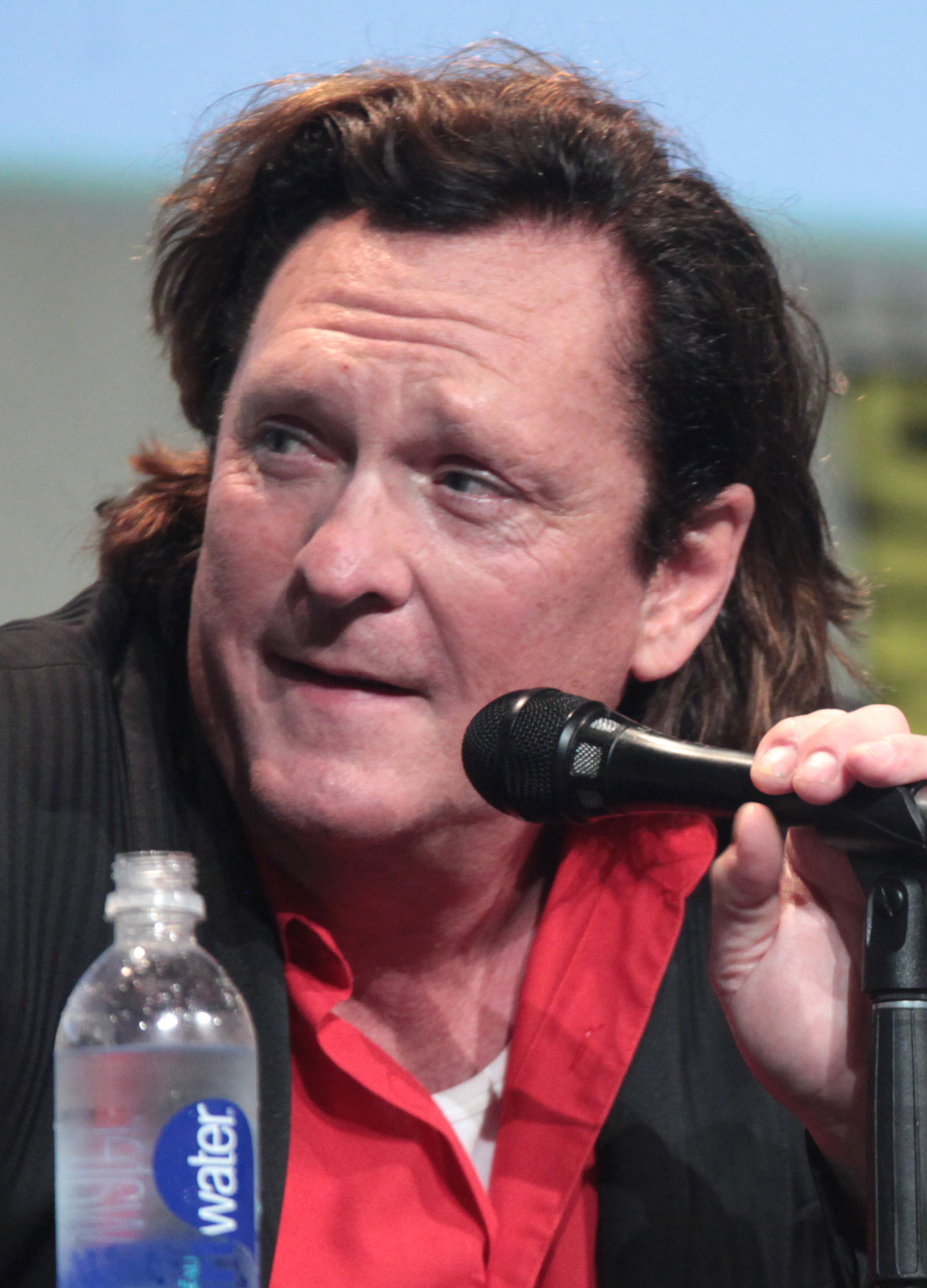
Michael Madsen
(Glen Greenwood)

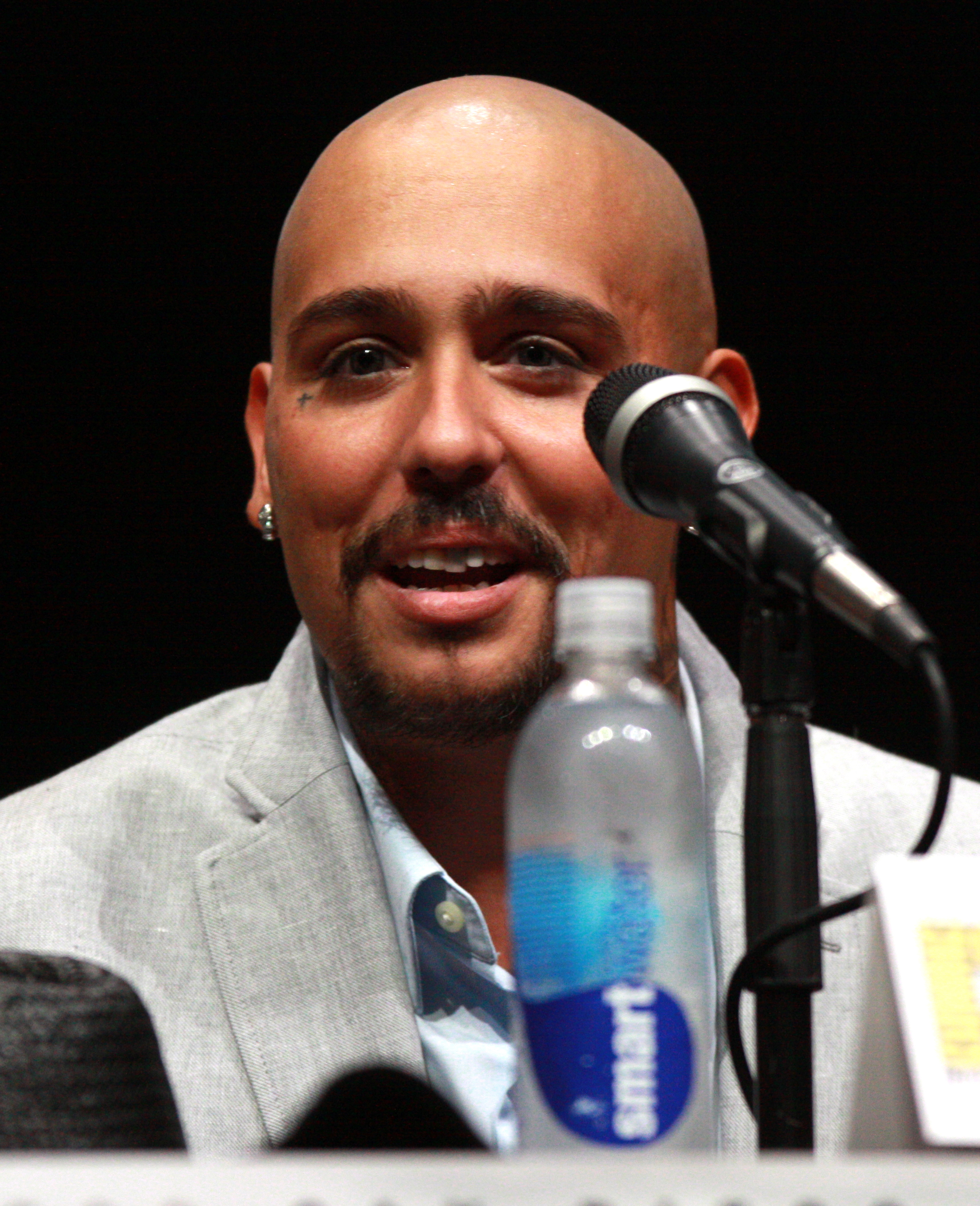
Francis Capra
(Elvis)

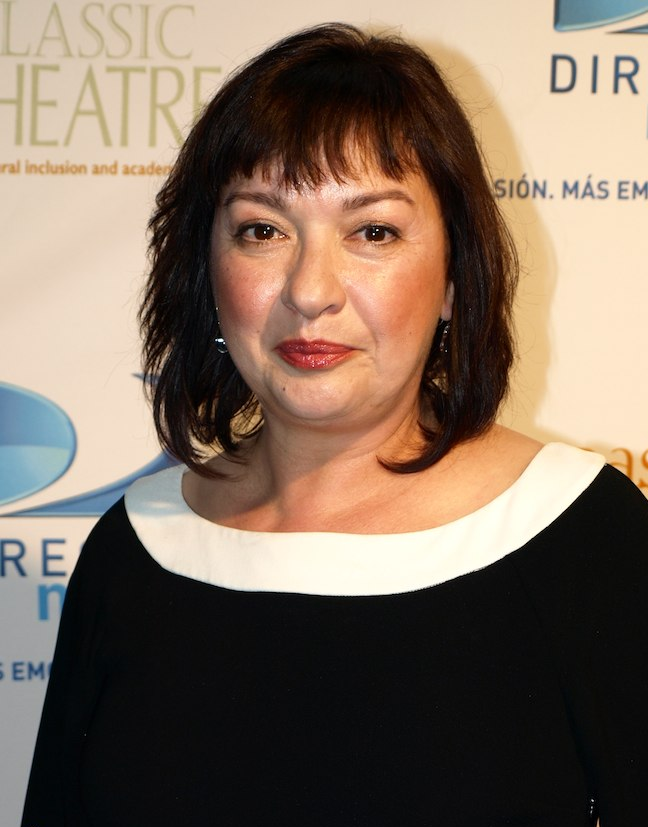
Elizabeth Peña
(Kate Haley)

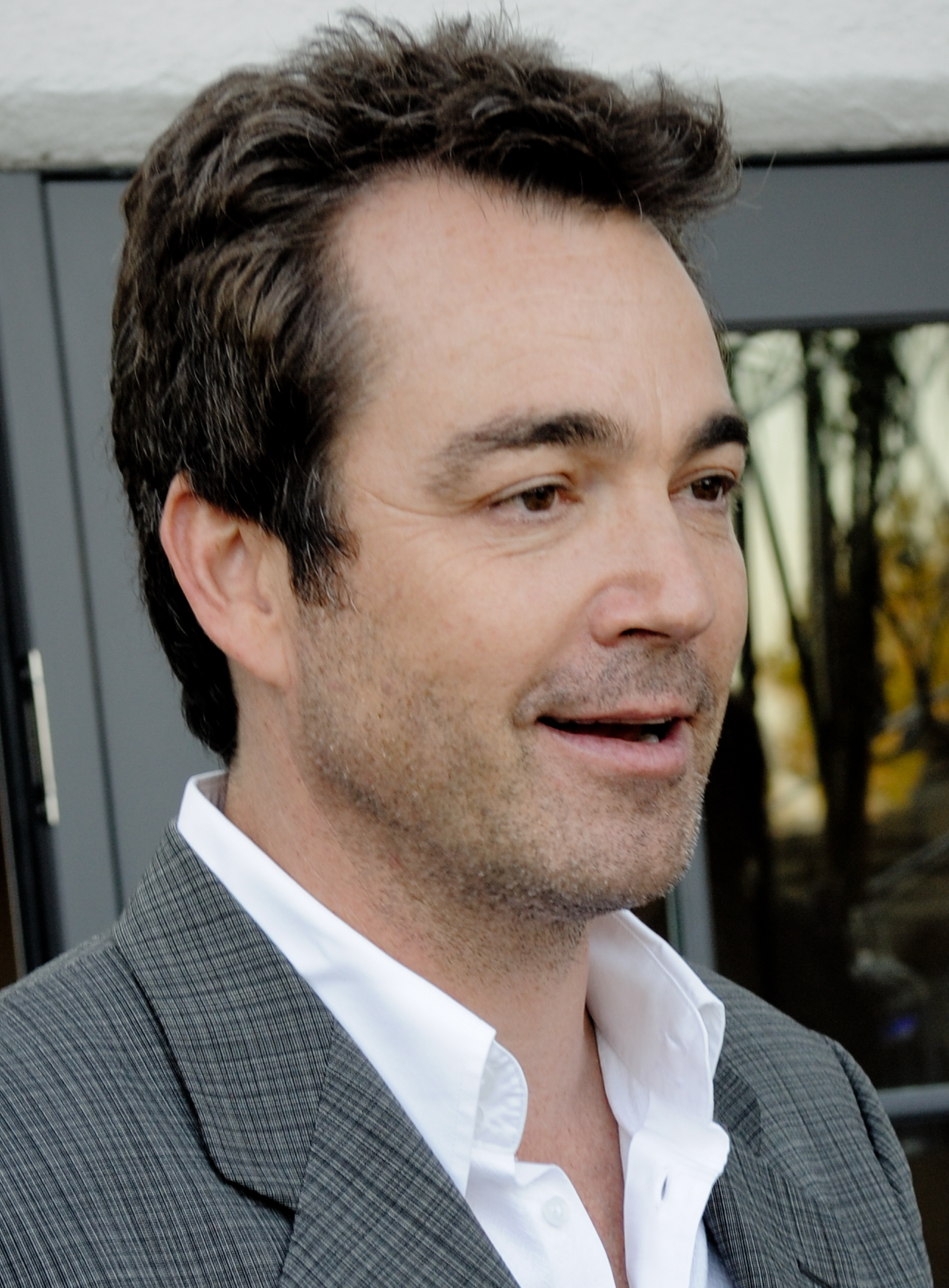
Jon Tenney
(John Milner)

- Jason James Richter as Jesse
- Francis Capra as Elvis
- Mary Kate Schellhardt as Nadine
- August Schellenberg as Randolph Johnson
- Michael Madsen as Glen Greenwood
- Jayne Atkinson as Annie Greenwood
- Mykelti Williamson as Dwight Mercer
- Elizabeth Peña as Dr. Kate Haley
- Jon Tenney as John Milner
- Paul Tuerpe as Milner's assistant
- M. Emmet Walsh as Wilcox
- John Considine as Commander Blake
- Steve Kahan as Captain Nilson
- Neal Matarazzo as Helmsman Kelly
- Al Sapienza as Engineer
- Basil Wallace as Reporter
- Marguerite Moreau as Julie
- Scott Stuber as a policeman
- Joan Lunden as herself

== Production ==
In November 1993, producer Lauren Shuler Donner and her husband and co-executive producer Richard Donner were pursuing active development of a sequel to Free Willy following the breakout success of the first film. Unlike the first film, the orca was fully animatronic, while the Free Willy Keiko Foundation devised a plan to bring Keiko to the Oregon Coast Aquarium where he would be rehabilitated from poor health. However, Keiko makes an uncredited appearance as Willy via an archival clip.

Jason James Richter returned to reprise his role as Jesse after renegotiating the original sequel option from the first film from $150,000 to $1.5 million with an option for a third sequel. Filming commenced in Astoria, Oregon, and the San Juan Islands between April and August 1994, with additional filming taking place in California. The LA84 Foundation/John C. Argue Swim Stadium was used to film the majority of the underwater scenes with the mini-whale animatronics.

== Soundtrack ==
Released through MJJ Music in association with 550 Music and Epic Soundtrax in 1995, the soundtrack contained most of the songs from the film plus two additional tracks from Brownstone, whose song "Sometimes Dancin'" first appeared on their debut album From the Bottom Up, and 3T who previously recorded "Didn't Mean to Hurt You" for the previous film. "My Spirit Calls Out", the K 'aw Daa Gangaas penned Haida song Randolph sings when he heals Luna, is the lone song not included on the soundtrack.

Basil Poledouris returned to compose new music and also incorporated several scoring elements from the previous film.

Michael Jackson continued his affiliation with the Free Willy franchise when "Childhood", from his greatest hits/ninth album HIStory: Past, Present and Future, Book I that originally debuted as a double A-side with that album's lead single "Scream", served as the main theme around Elvis. The instrumental version is also featured when Elvis tearfully looks at a photo of the Greenwoods and Jesse while spending the night alone.

An instrumental version of Nathan Cavaleri's song "Lou's Blues" was used to dub Jesse's offscreen guitar playing.

Additionally, two renditions of Bob Dylan's "Forever Young" are also featured in the film. One from Jackson's sister Rebbie can be heard inside the donut shop Elvis and Wilcox attend right before John arrives for his conversation with the latter, while the end credits (which featured orca footage background shots by Bob Talbot) used the previously recorded version by The Pretenders from the film With Honors and the band's album Last of the Independents.

Free Willy 2: The Adventure Home: Original Motion Picture Soundtrack

Soundtrack album by various artists
- Released: 1995
- Length: 39:15
- Labels: MJJ; 550 Music; Epic Soundtrax
- Producer: various

=== Track listing ===
No.	Title	Writer(s)	Artist	Length
1.	"Childhood (Theme from Free Willy 2)"	Michael Jackson	Michael Jackson	4:27
2.	"Forever Young"	Bob Dylan	Rebbie Jackson	4:24
3.	"Sometimes Dancin'" (feat. Spragga Benz)	Lloyd James; Nicki Gilbert; John O'Brien; Jonah; Soulshock; Karlin; Lloyd James	Brownstone	5:47
4.	"What Will It Take"	Taryll Jackson	3T	5:17
5.	"I'll Say Goodbye for the Two of Us"	Diane Warren	Exposé	4:47
6.	"Forever Young"	Bob Dylan	Pretenders	5:03
7.	"Lou's Blues"	Nathan Cavaleri	Nathan Cavaleri Band	3:14
8.	"Main Titles"		Basil Poledouris	3:30
9.	"Whale Swim"		Basil Poledouris	3:18
10.	"Reunion"		Basil Poledouris	3:38
12.	"Childhood (Theme from Free Willy 2)" (Instrumental)	Michael Jackson	Michael Jackson	4:27

== Reception ==
Free Willy 2 grossed $30 million in the United States and Canada and $68 million worldwide on a $31 million budget.

The film received mixed reviews from critics, though many were impressed with the film's subtle approach to pollution and other environmental issues, while focusing on family values. On the review aggregator website Rotten Tomatoes, 50% of 26 critics' reviews are positive, with an average rating of 4.8/10. The website's consensus reads: "Good-natured yet utterly unsurprising, Free Willy 2: The Adventure Home will strike all but the youngest of viewers as a poorly orca-strated sequel." Audiences polled by CinemaScore gave the film an average grade of "A-" on an A+ to F scale.

== Accolades ==
Free Willy 2 was nominated for "Worst Sequel" and "The Sequel Nobody Was Clamoring For" at the 1995 Stinkers Bad Movie Awards but lost to Ace Ventura: When Nature Calls and Halloween: The Curse of Michael Myers, respectively. Willy won "Favorite Animal Star" at the 1996 Kids' Choice Awards.
