= Free Willy 3: The Rescue =

- Theatrical release poster
- Directed by: Sam Pillsbury
- Written by: John Mattson
- Based on: Characters by Keith Walker
- Produced by: Jennie Lew Tugend
- Starring: Jason James Richter; August Schellenberg; Annie Corley; Vincent Berry; Patrick Kilpatrick
- Cinematography: Tobias A. Schliessler
- Edited by: Margaret Goodspeed
- Music by: Cliff Eidelman
- Production companies: Regency Enterprises; Shuler Donner/Donner
- Distributed by: Warner Bros.
- Release date: August 8, 1997
- Running time: 86 minutes
- Country: United States
- Language: English
- Box office: $3.4 million

Free Willy 3: The Rescue is a 1997 American family film directed by Sam Pillsbury and written by John Mattson. Released by Warner Bros. under their Warner Bros. Family Entertainment banner, it is the sequel to Free Willy 2: The Adventure Home in addition to being the third film in the Free Willy franchise and final installment of the original storyline as well as the last to be released theatrically. Jason James Richter and August Schellenberg reprise their roles from the previous films while Annie Corley, Vincent Berry and Patrick Kilpatrick joined the cast. The story revolves around Jesse and Randolph attempting to stop a group of whalers, led by its ruthless captain, from illegally hunting Willy while secretly receiving help from an unlikely source involving the captain's young son after an accident changed his view on whales.

Filming took place in British Columbia from July 31 to October 10, 1996, where several scenes were shot in Vancouver, Pitt Lake, Britannia Beach, Squamish and Howe Sound. The film is dedicated to Free Willy co-writer Keith Walker who died two months after production was completed.

Free Willy 3: The Rescue premiered on August 8, 1997. It received mixed reviews from critics and was a box-office bomb, grossing $3.4 million.

== Plot ==
Sixteen year-old Jesse works as an orca-research assistant on a research ship called the Noah alongside his old friend Randolph who promised Glen and Annie to keep him out of trouble while on the job. Aboard just such a ship, the Botany Bay, ten year-old Max Wesley takes his first trip to sea with his father, John, a whaler from a long line of whalers and learns the true unlawful nature of the family business which includes selling whale meat to an underground Japanese market. During his first hunt, Max accidentally falls overboard and comes face to face with Willy. Jesse and Randolph discover a spear on Willy's fin, leading them to suspect he, his pregnant mate Nicky and their pod are being illegally hunted by Botany Bay's whalers who are posing as commercial fishermen. Jesse goes to the Noah's head boss Drake about the threat to the whales, but he refuses to take action until Jesse manages to get proof. When Jesse and Max meet for the first time, Jesse introduces Max to Willy properly after learning of Max's experience and his liking of whales.

Later that night, while Randolph distracts John and the whalers at a bar like Jesse asked, Jesse manages to sneak on board the Botany Bay to steal one of the spears used to shoot the whales and discovers that the whalers are heading back out to go after Willy, Nicky and their pod, using an audio recording of a song which Jesse plays on his harmonica as a lure for Willy. Drake plans to call for help the next day, but knowing it will be too late then, Jesse, Randolph, and their fellow researcher Drew Halbert steal the Noah from her mooring and go after the whalers themselves. An outraged John finds out that his son is not on his side, but it does not stop Max as he jumps into the water, forcing the whalers to pause their pursuit of the whales to perform a "man overboard" rescue for Max, which gave Jesse, Randolph and Drew enough time to catch up.

After the trio unsuccessfully use a flare gun and their boat's P.A. system to try to bluff the whalers into stopping, Jesse rams the Noah into the Botany Bay just as John fires a harpoon, the jolt causing the harpoon to miss Willy and knocking John into the water. Willy tries to kill him, but Jesse and Max convince Willy to spare him. John gets trapped under a net and nearly drowns, and ultimately comes face to face with Willy himself. Willy pushes him to the surface, allowing Jesse and Randolph to rescue him. The Coastal Marine Patrol arrive, having been summoned on the radio by Jesse before he rammed the Botany Bay, and catch the whalers in the act and arrest them. Being saved by Willy causes John to see the errors of his whaling ways and he reconciles with Max who forgives him.

Days later, Jesse, Randolph, Drew and Max witness the birth of Willy and Nicky's son. Max suggests naming the newborn calf after Willy, but Jesse decides to name him after Max. After that, Willy, Nicky and Max swim off into the open sea.

== Cast ==
- Jason James Richter as Jesse Greenwood
- August Schellenberg as Randolph Johnson
- Annie Corley as Drew Halbert
- Vincent Berry as Max Wesley
- Patrick Kilpatrick as John Wesley
- Tasha Simms as Mary Wesley
- Peter LaCroix as Sanderson
- Stephen E. Miller as Dineen
- Ian Tracey as Kron
- Matthew Walker as Captain Drake
- Roger R. Cross as 1st Mate Stevens
- Rick Burgess as Smiley
- Roman Danylo as Pizza Kid

== Soundtrack ==
Free Willy 3: The Rescue (Original Motion Picture Soundtrack)

Film score by Cliff Eidelman
- Released: July 29, 1997
- Genre: Film score
- Length: 28:56
- Label: Varèse Sarabande
- Producer: Cliff Eidelman

Free Willy 3: The Rescue marked the first Free Willy film that did not feature music by Michael Jackson, whose songs "Will You Be There" and "Childhood" appeared in the first and second films respectively. Basil Poledouris, who composed the scores for the first two films, also did not return. The score was composed by Cliff Eidelman, and was performed by the Toronto Symphony Orchestra. Eidelman's score includes excerpts from two pieces composed by Poledouris for the original film, "The Gifts" and the main title. The latter is heard at the end of the piece "A New Family", which plays at the end of the film.

The songs "China Grove" by The Doobie Brothers, "What Do You See?" by Skydiggers, "Big Sky" by The Reverend Horton Heat, and "Pressin' On" by Little Charlie & the Nightcats are heard in the film, although none appear on the soundtrack.

The soundtrack was released on July 29, 1997, by Varèse Sarabande.

=== Track listing ===
No.	Title	Length
1.	"Main Title"	1:44
2.	"Awakening"	4:06
3.	"Harpoon Assembly"	0:53
4.	"Whale Call"	1:29
5.	"Birth"	3:06
6.	"Willy Signals"	1:03
7.	"The Hunt"	3:09
8.	"Obsession"	2:09
9.	"Redemption"	2:36
10.	"You Were Right"	2:08
11.	"A New Family"	1:35
12.	"End Credits"	3:49
Total length:		28:56

== Reception ==
On Rotten Tomatoes, the film has an approval rating of 45%, based on reviews from 20 critics. Audiences polled by CinemaScore gave the film an average grade of "B+" on an A+ to F scale.

Siskel & Ebert called Free Willy 3 the best film in the series. Roger Ebert gave it a thumbs-up and 3 out of 4 stars in his review, writing that "the series has grown up" and "smart" kids will enjoy it.
