= Keith Walker (writer) =

American screenwriter and radio writer

Keith Walker (June 29, 1935 — December 30, 1996) was an American writer, producer, and actor.

== Career ==
He co-wrote the screenplay for the film Free Willy, and wrote for television series including The Fall Guy, Emergency!, Quincy, M.E. and M*A*S*H. He wrote 26 episodes of the Rod Serling hosted radio show The Zero Hour, all of them coming in the second, and final, season of the show. He appeared as an actor on television shows Mannix, The Rookies, Mission: Impossible, and Fantasy Island. Walker had a memorable role as Irving Walsh in the film The Goonies. He was married to actress Peggy Walton-Walker.

Following brief treatment for cancer, Keith Walker died in Franklin, Tennessee at the age of 61 in late 1996. The third Free Willy film, Free Willy 3: The Rescue, was dedicated to his memory.

== Filmography ==
=== Film ===
==== Acting credits ====
Year	Title	Role	Notes
1973	Time to Run	Jesse St.James	
1974	Earthquake	Josh	as Keith Walt
1977	Age of Innocence	Raymond Stein	Uncredited
1978	Till Death	John Perkins	
1984	Future Schlock	Hal Tatts	
1985	The Goonies	Mr. Walsh	Final role

==== Screenwriting credits ====
Year	Title	Notes
1993	Free Willy	as Keith A. Walker; co-writer & story

=== Television ===
==== Acting credits ====
Year	Title	Role	Notes
1968	It Takes a Thief	1st Man	Episode: "Get Me to the Revolution on Time"
1969–71	Ironside	Arthur Nadeliano / Reporter	2 episodes
1970–73	Mannix	Newcaster / Announcer / Smith / Barney	5 episodes
1970	Nancy	Began	Episode: "The Smallest Diamond in the World"
1971	The Young Lawyers	Reporter / Reporter #1 & #2	2 episodes
1971	The F.B.I.	Newscaster	Episode: "Three-Way Split"
1972	Longstreet	Reporter	Episode: "Field of Honor"
1973	The Affair	First Man	Television film
1974–75	Kolchak: The Night Stalker	TV reporter / 1st reporter	2 episodes + 1 uncredited
1974	Police Story	Policeman	Episode: "Requiem for C.Z. Smith"
1974	The Law	Dwight Healy	Television film
1974	The Rookies	Paul	Episode: "Blue Christmas"
1975	The Missing Are Deadly	News announcer	Television film
1975	S.W.A.T.	T.V. announcer	Episode: "The Killing Ground"
1975	Barbary Coast	Upstairs guard	Episode: "An Iron-Clad Plan"
1975	The Blue Knight	Wright	Episode: "Two to Make Deadly"
1975	Bronk	Randell	Episode: "There's Gonna Be War"
1976	Black Sheep Squadron	Naval Officer	Episode: "Prisoners of War"
1976	Spencer's Pilots	Doctor	Episode: "The Hitchhiker"
1978	Quincy M.E.	Newsman	as Keith A. Walker; Episode: "Gone But Not Forgotten"
1982	Bret Maverick	Holson	Episode: "The Ballad of Bret Maverick"
1982	Fantasy Island	Second	Episode: "The Ghost's Story/The Spoilers"
1985	Double Dare	Mr Stone	Episode: "Hong Kong King Con"
1985	Malice in Wonderland	Albert	as Keith A. Walker; Television film
1985	The A-Team	Dr. Craig	2 episodes
1987	Our House	Judge #2	Episode: "Giving 'em the Business"

==== Screenwriting credits ====
Year	Title	Notes
1973	M*A*S*H	Episode: "5 O'Clock Charlie"; story & teleplay
1975	Emergency!	as Keith A. Walker; Episode: "To Buy or Not to Buy"
1977	The Hardy Boys/Nancy Drew Mysteries	Episode: "The Secret of the Whispering Walls"; story & teleplay
1984	The Fall Guy	as Keith A. Walker; Episode: "Dead Bounty"; story & teleplay
