= Ivan Rogers (actor) =

American actor and film director

- Born: September 20, 1954
- Died: August 22, 2010 (aged 55); Indianapolis
- Occupations: Actor, director, producer, musician
- Years active: 1980s - 2010

Ivan Rogers (1954–2010) was an independent film actor, director and producer. He was also a musician. He appeared to be following in the footsteps of his mentor, fellow Indiana native, Fred Williamson.

== Background ==
Rogers was born on September 20, 1954. He was one of three boys born to Paul B. Rogers and his wife Ola. His father was a building contractor.

Rogers studied at Ball State University and was in a music program. He left the university to become a professional musician. He worked in various R&B bands and even backed Marvin Gaye. He was also a martial artist and a second dan black belt. A professional kick boxer, he competed in martial arts and kickboxing tournaments in the US and abroad. He was approached by a video disc company executive to make an instructional video which he ended up starring in as well as writing and producing. In his travels he met former Elvis Presley bodyguard Mike Stone who had a degree of success with producing made-for-television movies. On the advice of Stone, Rogers moved to Los Angeles to further his film career. Fred Williamson gave him advice on other aspects of the film business.

== Career ==
In the mid-1980s, Rogers had a video out called Karate & Self Defense, released through Best Film & Video Corporation.

His 1987 film Two Wrongs Make a Right was directed by Robert Brown. It had a resemblance harking back to the black actioners of the 1970s. According to Variety Film Reviews it also had an abstract tone and a similarity to work by French filmmaker Jean-Pierre Melville. He produced and directed Caged Women II about a woman who encounters, drugs, molestation and torture. Rogers played Detective Nate Penna in the film. His films include Forgive Me Father which came out in the early 2000s. In the film Rogers plays a hit man who has been living as a priest in Canada. Thought to be dead Father Virgil Garrett (played by Rogers) goes after the people who killed his brother. It premiered at the Madame Walker Theatre Center in Indiana in March 2000. Rogers donated a portion of the premiere takings to Indianapolis Police department.

== Death ==
He died in Indianapolis on 22 August 2010.

== Selected filmography ==
Actor
Title	Role	Director	Year	Notes #
One Way Out	Det. Joe Weeks	Paul Kyriazi	1986	
Two Wrongs Make a Right	Fletcher Quinn	Robert Brown	1987	screen story and screenplay by Ivan Rogers
Slow Burn	Murphy	John Eyres	1989	
Ballbuster	Roosevelt Prophet	Eddie Beverly Jr.	1989	
The Runner	Lewis T. Holden	Chris Jones	1992	
Striking Point	Capt. Matthews	Thomas H. Fenton	1995	
Karate Raider	Edwards	Ronald L. Marchini, Charlie Ordonez	1995	
Caged Women II	Det. Nate Penna	Ivan Rogers	1996	Screenplay by Ivan Rogers
Laserhawk	Col. Lewis Teagarden USAF	Jean Pellerin	1997	
Forgive Me Father	Father Virgil Garrett	Ivan Rogers	2001	
Down 'n Dirty	Bartender	Fred Williamson	2001	
The Payback Man	Jesse Cole	Ivan Rogers	2010	Story by Ivan Rogers

Producer, writer, director
Title	Role	Year	Notes #
Karate and Self-Defense	Writer, producer	1985	
One Way Out	Producer, screen story and screenplay	1986	
Tigershark	Screenplay	1987	
Two Wrongs Make a Right	Producer, screen story and screenplay	1987	
Ballbuster	Producer	1989	
Caged Women II	Director, producer, screenplay & story	1996	
Forgive Me Father	Director, producer	2001	
The Payback Man	Director, producer, story	2010	
