= Friday the Rabbi Slept Late =

1964 mystery novel by Harry Kemelman

- First edition cover
- Author: Harry Kemelman
- Language: English
- Series: Rabbi Small
- Genre: Mystery Novel
- Publisher: Crown Publishing
- Publication date: 1964
- Publication place: United States
- Media type: Print (Hardback & Paperback)
- Pages: 160 pp (first edition, hardback)
- ISBN: 0-449-20851-6
- OCLC: 12883658

Friday the Rabbi Slept Late is a 1964 mystery novel by Harry Kemelman, the first of the successful Rabbi Small series.

== Plot introduction ==
The fictional hero of the book, David Small, is the unconventional leader of the Conservative Jewish congregation in the fictional suburban Massachusetts town of Barnard's Crossing. As the protagonist of a series of novels, Rabbi Small has wisdom, an unerring sense of Jewish tradition (which can at times put him at odds with the Jewish community when he believes that they are seriously deviating from Judaism) and all the good qualities of a detective sharpened by his Talmudic training, which enables him to see the third side of a problem. He is a devoted husband to his wife and (later in the series) father to his two children Jonathan and Hepsibah.

Small's logic, learned from the Talmud, plays an important part in the plots. Usually Small is drawn into the events when they involve a member of his congregation or Barnard's Crossing's Jewish community in general. Small has many troubles with his congregation and he is constantly at odds with at least one of its powerful members, usually the Temple President at the time.

Hugh Lanigan is the local police chief. Lanigan (a Catholic) and Small become friendly, and they often discuss religion over a cup of tea.

== Plot summary ==
The body of a young woman is found on the grounds of the Temple. The woman had been strangled and evidence points to Rabbi Small - her purse is found in his car, which had been left in the Temple parking lot the night before.

== Characters ==
- David Small – the newly hired rabbi of the title; protagonist
- Hugh Lanigan – the local police chief
- Miriam Small – the Rabbi's wife
- Jacob Wasserman – the President of the Temple
- Al Becker – local car dealer, unfriendly towards Rabbi Small
- Elspeth Bleech – the murder victim, whose body is found on the Temple grounds
- Stanley Doble – the Temple custodian and handyman

== Series ==
Between 1966 and 1996, Kemelman wrote a total of 11 sequels to Friday the Rabbi Slept Late. See here for the titles of the other novels in the series.

== Awards and nominations ==
The novel received an Edgar Award in 1965, from the Mystery Writers of America, for Best First Novel.

== Adaptations ==
Kemelman received $35,000 for the rights to the novel. A made-for-TV adaptation with the title Lanigan's Rabbi was broadcast on NBC in 1976, starring Art Carney as Chief Paul Lanigan and Stuart Margolin as Rabbi David Small. A short-lived TV series followed as part of the NBC Sunday Mystery Movie, with Carney reprising his role as Chief Lanigan, and Bruce Solomon taking over the role of Rabbi Small.

== Release details ==
- 1964, U.S., Crown (OCLC 2901585), publication date, 1964, hardback (First edition)
- 1965?, U.S., Fawcett Crest (ISBN 0-449-20851-6; OCLC 12883658), paperback
- 1965, UK, Hutchinson (ISBN 0-7434-3487-0), publication date 30 July 2002, hardback
- 1979, U.S., Crown (ISBN 0-517-50691-2), publication date, October 1979, hardback
- 1983, U.S., GK Hall (ISBN 0-8161-3537-1), publication date, October 1983, hardback
- 1993, U.S., Fawcett Books (ISBN 0-449-45127-5), January 1993, paperback
- 2002, U.S., Simon & Schuster (ISBN 0-7434-3487-0), publication date 30 July 2002, paperback

The novel has been released in unabridged audiobook format by arrangement with The Harry Kemelman Estate by Recorded Books, Inc. (ISBN 0-7887-1300-0), 1997 and narrated by George Guidall.

== See also ==
- Wednesday the Rabbi Got Wet
