= Harry Kemelman =

American writer

- Born: Boston, Massachusetts
- Died: December 15, 1996 (aged 88); Marblehead, Massachusetts
- Education: Bachelors, Masters in Linguistics
- Alma mater: Boston University (1930), Harvard (1931)
- Occupations: Writer, teacher
- Spouse: Anne Kessin Kemelman
- Children: Diane Volk, Ruth Rooks, Arthur Kemelman
- Writing career
- Language: English
- Years active: 1964–1996
- Period: 1964–1996
- Genre: Mystery
- Subject: Religion
- Notable work: Friday the Rabbi Slept Late
- Notable awards: Edgar Award, Best First Novel, 1965

Harry Kemelman (November 24, 1908 – December 15, 1996) was an American mystery writer and a professor of English. He was the creator of the fictitious religious sleuth Rabbi David Small.

First Rabbi Small novel, which was the basis for the TV film and series, Lanigan's Rabbi.

== Early life ==
Harry Kemelman was born in Boston, Massachusetts, in 1908.

After receiving a B.A. in English Literature from Boston University and an M.A. in English philology from Harvard, he taught at a number of schools before World War II. During the war, Kemelman worked as wage administrator for the United States Army Transportation Corps in Boston and later for the War Assets Administration. Following the war, he was a freelance writer and private businessman. In 1963 he became assistant professor of English at the Benjamin Franklin Institute of Technology in Boston. He was also an assistant professor at Boston State College in the 1960s.

== Writing career ==
His writing career began with short stories for Ellery Queen's Mystery Magazine featuring New England college professor Nicky Welt, the first of which, "The Nine Mile Walk", is considered a classic.

The Rabbi Small series began in 1964 with the publication of Friday the Rabbi Slept Late, which became a huge bestseller, and won Kemelman a 1965 Edgar Award for Best First Novel. The Rabbi Small books are not only mysteries, but also considerations of Conservative Judaism.

== Adaptations ==
Kemelman also received $35,000 for the movie rights to Friday the Rabbi Slept Late, a made-for-TV adaptation of which was broadcast on NBC in 1976. The film starred Art Carney as Chief Lanigan and Stuart Margolin as Rabbi Small. A short-lived TV series, Lanigan's Rabbi, shown as part of NBC's Mystery Movie series in January 1977, was based on the book series. Art Carney played Chief Lanigan with Bruce Solomon as Rabbi Small.

In 2003, director Alvaro Brechner shot an adaptation of "The Nine Mile Walk" in Toledo, Spain. The film was shown in more than 100 international film festivals, garnering several awards.

== Death ==
Kemelman died in 1996, at the age of 88, in Marblehead, Massachusetts.

== Bibliography ==
=== The Nicky Welt stories ===
1. "The Nine Mile Walk" – 1947
2. "The Straw Man" – 1950
3. "The Ten O'Clock Scholar" – 1952
4. "End Play" – 1950
5. "Time and Time Again (The Man with Two Watches)" – 1962
6. "The Whistling Tea Kettle (The Adelphi Bowl)" – 1963
7. "The Bread and Butter Case (A Winter's Tale)" – 1962
8. "The Man on the Ladder" – 1967
- Collected in The Nine Mile Walk – 1967

=== The Rabbi Small novels ===
1. Friday the Rabbi Slept Late – 1964
2. Saturday the Rabbi Went Hungry – 1966
3. Sunday the Rabbi Stayed Home – 1969
4. Monday the Rabbi Took Off – 1972
5. Tuesday the Rabbi Saw Red – 1973
6. Wednesday the Rabbi Got Wet – 1976
7. Thursday the Rabbi Walked Out – 1978
8. Conversations with Rabbi Small – 1981 (largely a dialogue about Judaism with a young couple Small meets on vacation)
9. Someday the Rabbi Will Leave – 1985
10. One Fine Day the Rabbi Bought a Cross – 1987
11. The Day the Rabbi Resigned – 1992
12. That Day the Rabbi Left Town – 1996

=== Non-fiction ===
- Common Sense in Education – 1970
