= Dwight H. Little =

American film and television director (born 1956)

- Born: Dwight Hubbard Little; January 13, 1956 (age 70); Cleveland, Ohio, U.S.
- Other name: Dwight Little
- Education: USC School of Cinematic Arts
- Occupation: Film director
- Years active: 1982−present
- Children: 3

Dwight Hubbard Little (born January 13, 1956) is an American film and television director. He is known for directing the horror films Halloween 4: The Return of Michael Myers (1988) and The Phantom of the Opera (1989), and the action movies Marked for Death (1990) and Rapid Fire (1992). He has also directed episodes of television series such as 24, Prison Break, Dollhouse, Bones and Nikita.

== Early life and education ==
Little was born and raised in Cleveland, Ohio. He developed an interest in filmmaking around age 8, when his father bought him a Super 8 camera. He graduated from the USC School of Cinematic Arts.

== Career ==
Little got his first break in the film business when producer Sandy Howard asked him to shoot credits B-roll for Triumphs of a Man Called Horse. Howard needed the film to be longer in order to be able to sell it overseas. When Little was finished, Howard asked him to make him an action film for the video market. Little made KGB: The Secret War for a budget of $300,000. From that film, Little edited a show-reel that got him the attention of several members of the Hunt-Hill family from Texas who asked him to make an action film. This became Getting Even. According to Little, the film was devised around everything the family members owned: helicopters, a ranch, a Learjet. Little was then asked by Nico Mastorakis to direct the action adventure film Bloodstone in India.

Little's first chance at directing a union film was Halloween 4: The Return of Michael Myers. Little rejected the treatment that was written by John Carpenter and Debra Hill and pitched producer Moustapha Akkad the idea for what became Halloween 4. On the basis of Halloween 4, Steven Seagal asked Little to direct his next film, which was Hard to Kill. The studio (Warner) vetoed Seagal's choice of director and went for Bruce Malmuth instead. Little went on to make The Phantom of the Opera for producer Menahem Golan. Little got offered Halloween 5: The Revenge of Michael Myers, but declined. He worried he would be trapped in the horror genre. Little got a chance to do another action film when Steven Seagal asked Little to direct Marked for Death. The film became a modest hit and Little got a chance to make Rapid Fire for the same studio (Fox), which was an attempt to launch the career of Brandon Lee as an in-house action star for Fox.

While reading an article on how the Navy had a term for when they lose a nuclear missile, Little got the idea for Broken Arrow. He pitched it at Fox. The studio asked writer Graham Yost to develop the script with Little, with Little being attached to direct. But when the script was finished early and Fox wanted to head into production, Little was still editing Free Willy 2: The Adventure Home. He decided to finish Free Willy 2 at Warner. Fox asked John Woo to direct Broken Arrow, while giving Little an executive producer's credit. Little says Woo's film bares little resemblance to what he envisioned. "I wanted to do a Tom Clancy type thriller (...). John Woo made it much lighter. John Travolta played it over the top. The movie was tongue-in-cheek and campy. But you can't blame him, because it made a lot of money."

Because Warner was pleased with how Free Willy 2 turned out, Little got the chance to direct Murder at 1600, a conspiracy thriller starring Wesley Snipes and Diane Lane. The studio had promised Little that Murder at 1600 would open in January 1997, while Clint Eastwood's Absolute Power would open in April of the same year. A test screening was held of Murder at 1600 in December 1996. The response was positive. According to Little, somebody for Eastwood's production company Malpaso heard about the excellent test screening of Murder at 1600 and told Eastwood about it. Little: "I'm not sure Clint was even aware of our movie, but he (...) went to Bob Daly and Terry Semel, who were the chiefs at Warner Brothers, and demanded that Absolute Power be released first. He's a smart guy. He doesn't want to be second with another White House thriller. So we get a call that our movie was pushed back to April. It was so disappointing. Every review said: Just like last month's Absolute Power… We looked like the copycat."

After directing mostly television for almost twenty years, Little returned to feature film making with the true crime drama Last Rampage, based on the non-fiction book Last Rampage: The Escape of Gary Tison by University of Arizona Political Science Professor James W. Clarke. The film deals with events that happened in 1978, when convicted murderer Gary Tison, played by Robert Patrick, escaped from prison with the help of his three sons. Heather Graham stars as his wife and Bruce Davison as the lawman who heads the manhunt. Little got the book from his stepson, actor Jason James Richter. Last Rampage was reviewed favorably by Variety, who praised "the no-frills efficiency" and "the brisk and suspenseful narrative". Rex Reed of The Observer called the film "grim and hopelessly despondent, but superbly acted and strangely effective." Little himself called it "the most honest" of his films.

In 2023, returned to the horror genre with the slasher film Natty Knocks, featuring previous collaborators Danielle Harris and Robert Englund.

== Filmography ==
Year	Title	Functioned as			Notes
Year	Title	Director	Writer	Executive Producer	Notes
1983	Triumphs of a Man Called Horse	Addtl.	No	No	Shot opening and closing credits, credited as 'Special photographer'.
1985	KGB: The Secret War	Yes	Story	No	
1986	Getting Even	Yes	Story	No	
1988	Bloodstone	Yes	No	No	
1988	Halloween 4: The Return of Michael Myers	Yes	No	No	
1989	The Phantom of the Opera	Yes	No	No	
1990	Marked for Death	Yes	No	No	
1992	Rapid Fire	Yes	No	No	
1995	Free Willy 2: The Adventure Home	Yes	No	No	
1997	Murder at 1600	Yes	No	No	
2004	Anacondas: The Hunt for the Blood Orchid	Yes	No	No	
2010	Tekken	Yes	No	No	
2017	Last Rampage	Yes	No	Yes	
2023	Natty Knocks	Yes	No	No	

==== Executive producer only ====
- Broken Arrow (1996)

=== Television ===
Year	Title	Notes
1989	Freddy's Nightmares	Episode: "Do Dreams Bleed?"
1997-99	Millennium	3 episodes
1998-02	The Practice	9 episodes
1999	Strange World	
2001	Wolf Lake	Episode: "The Changing"
2001	Citizen Baines	Episode: "Lost and Found"
2002	The X-Files	Episode: "Scary Monsters"
2002	John Doe	Episode: "Low Art"
2003	Veritas: The Quest	Episode: "Avalon"
2005	Law & Order: Trial by Jury	Episode: "Vigilante"
2005	Just Legal	Episode: "The Black Box"
2005-06	The Inside	2 episodes
2005-09	Prison Break	5 episodes
2006	24	2 episodes
2006	Vanished	Episode: "The Black Box"
2006	Day Break	Episode: "What If They're Stuck?"
2006-17	Bones	23 episodes
2009	Castle	Episode: "Inventing the Girl"
2009	Dollhouse	2 episodes
2010	Tower Prep	Episode: "Field Trip"
2011	Body of Proof	Episode: "Second Chances"
2011	Criminal Minds: Suspect Behavior	Episode: "Night Hawks"
2011-13	Nikita	5 episodes
2011-14	Drop Dead Diva	4 episodes
2012	The Finder	Episode: "Little Mean Green"
2014	Matador	Episode: "Enter the Worm"
2014-16	Sleepy Hollow	3 episodes
2014-16	From Dusk till Dawn: The Series	4 episodes
2014-17	Scorpion	3 episodes
2015	Arrow	Episode: "Public Enemy"
2015	Agents of S.H.I.E.L.D.	Episode: Among Us Hide...
2017	Daytime Divas	Episode: "Truth's a Mutha"
2022	9-1-1	Episode: "Boston"

TV movies and miniseries

- Papa's Angels (2000)
- Boss of Bosses (2001)
- Home by Spring (2018)

=== Video games ===
- Ground Zero: Texas (1993)
