= Tigershark (film) =

1987 film

- Theatrical release poster
- Directed by: Emmett Alston
- Written by: Mike Stone
- Screenplay by: Ivan Rogers
- Produced by: Lana Lee Jones
- Starring: Mike Stone; John Quade; Pamela Bryant; Vic Silayan; Roy Alvarez
- Cinematography: Robert Ebinger
- Edited by: Quito Colayco
- Music by: Quito Colayco
- Distributed by: Manson International Pictures
- Release date: 1987
- Running time: 98 minutes
- Countries: United States; Philippines
- Language: English

Tigershark is a 1987 action film directed by Emmett Alston and starring Mike Stone, John Quade, and Pamela Bryant.

== Plot ==
A martial arts instructor sets out to rescue his girlfriend who is being held for ransom by a South American warlord.

== Cast ==
- Mike Stone as Tava Parker
- John Quade as 'Cowboy' Dave Reynolds
- Pamela Jean Bryant as Karen
- Vic Silayan as Colonel Barro
- Roy Alvarez as Tony
- Roland Dantes as Ponsok
- Jaime Fabregas as Vladimir
- Lana Lee Jones as Jan Carter
- Rosemarie Gil as Madame Claude
