= Rafael Leyva =

Puerto Rican cinematographer

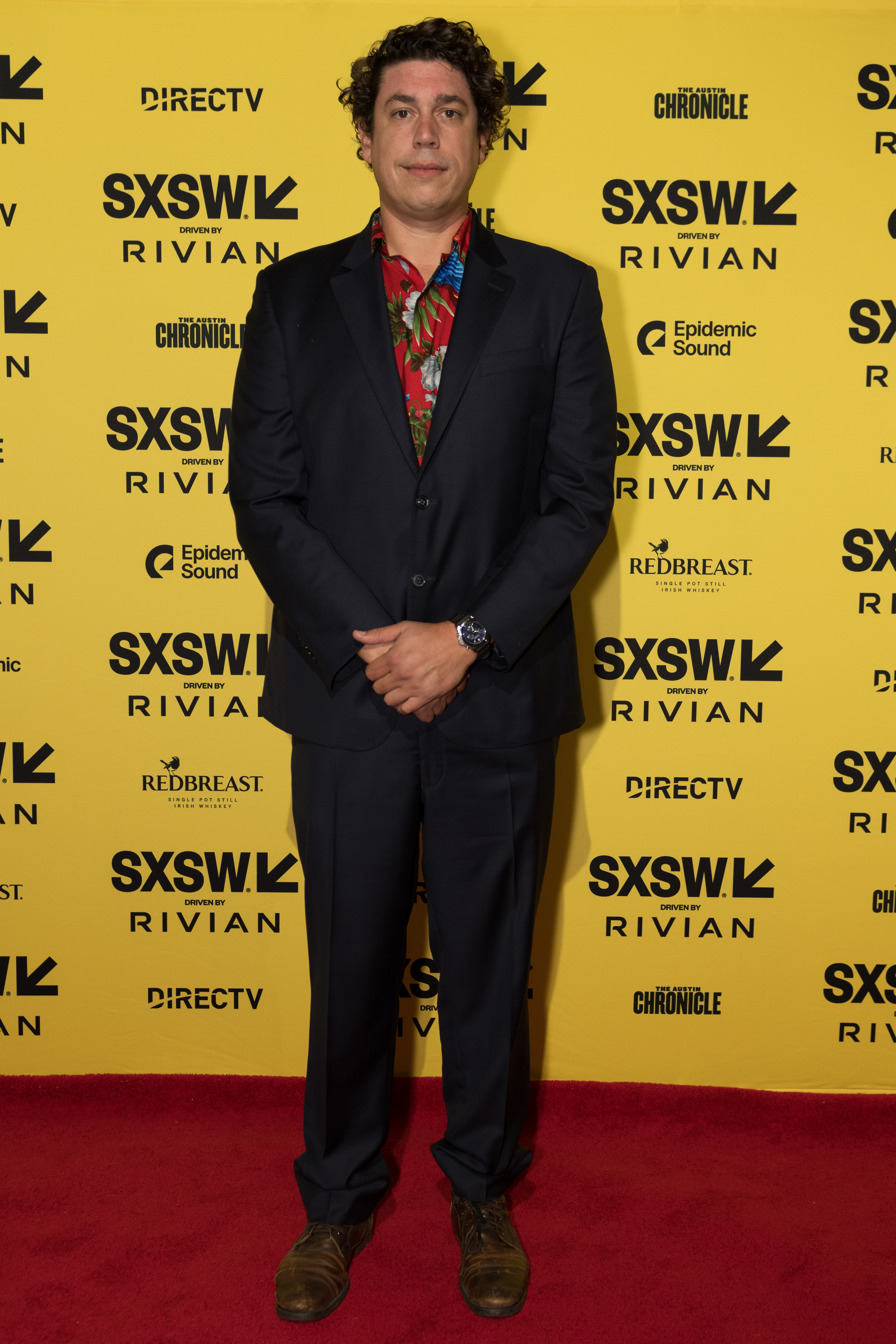
- Born: Ponce, Puerto Rico
- Occupation: Cinematographer
- Years active: 2015 - Present

Rafael Leyva is a Puerto Rican cinematographer based in Los Angeles, California. He is best known for his work on Last Rampage and Ultra Violet & Black Scorpion. He has been recognised as a Rising Star by the American Society of Cinematographers and as a Generation Next Director of Photography by the International Cinematographers Guild.

== Career ==
Leyva's breakthrough came with the 2017 feature film Last Rampage, directed by Dwight H. Little and based on the true story of Arizona prison escapee Gary Tison. Variety reviewed the film on its release. The same year, his work was highlighted in the ASC magazine September 2017 issue.

In 2018, Leyva was named one of the American Society of Cinematographers' Rising Stars of Cinematography, a distinction recognizing emerging talent in the field.. The following year, the International Cinematographers Guild selected him as one of its Generation Next Directors of Photography, a recognition for outstanding work across multiple narrative projects.

In 2022, Leyva served as cinematographer on Ultra Violet & Black Scorpion, a Disney+ superhero series created by Gary Morgenstein and directed by Dan Hernandez and Benji Samit. The series was notable as the first single camera Latinx series on the platform. His work on the series was featured in the June 2022 issue of ICG Magazine.

He worked as cinematographer on New Eden (2023), a short film written and directed by Michal Zebede and starring Emily Tosta and Niko Guardado, which was selected as an Official Selection at the Los Angeles International Film Festival.

He was one of the directors of photography on Ghost Elephants (2025), a documentary directed by Werner Herzog following conservationist Steve Boyes on an expedition through Angola in search of a rumoured lineage of giant elephants. The film had its world premiere out of competition at the 82nd Venice International Film Festival and was acquired by National Geographic Documentary Films for theatrical release and streaming on Disney+ and Hulu. Critics specifically noted his contribution to the film's visual identity, with one review describing the cinematography as integral to its atmospheric power.

== Selected filmography ==
=== Feature film ===
Year	Title	Director	Notes
2017	Last Rampage	Dwight H. Little	
2017	Sinister Minister	Jose Montesinos	
2018	Home by Spring	Dwight H. Little	
2025	Reeling	Yana Alliata	
2025	Ghost Elephants	Werner Herzog	Documentary

=== Television ===
Year	Title	Director	Notes
2022	Ultra Violet & Black Scorpion	Dan Hernandez and Benji Samit	

== Accolades ==
Year	Award	Category	Result	Ref.
2018	American Society of Cinematographers	Rising Star of Cinematography	Won	
2019	International Cinematographers Guild	Generation Next Director of Photography	Won	
