= Edward Feldman =

Edward Feldman may refer to:

- Edward S. Feldman (1929–2020), American film and television producer
- Edward H. Feldman (1920–1988), American television director and producer
