= Chris Browning =

American actor (born 1964)

- Born: Christopher Jay Browning; Reno, Nevada, US
- Occupation: Actor
- Years active: 1987–present
- Spouses: Sarah Browning; Chrissy Lucia
- Children: 4

Christopher Jay Browning is an American television and film actor, known for film work and character roles.

== Career ==
Christopher Jay Browning began his acting career in 1987, at age 22 or 23, with a sitcom television series. Due to his drug problems at the time, he spent several years homeless and also served time in jail. He sought treatment for his addiction in 1994. He was cast in the miniseries Hardball as Lloyd LaCombe. He was later cast in a recurring role in In the House. His first major role in a film came in 1996, in The Children of Captain Grant. He also had a recurring role in the day-time soap As the World Turns as David Allen. After not appearing in films and movies between 1999 and 2005 due to his rehabilitation, he made an appearance in the film, A Piece of Pie. In that same year, he was cast in his first big budget film, 3:10 to Yuma. After this he was cast in television shows such as Easy Money and the 2008 film Felon.

In mid-2008, he was cast in the Terminator reboot, Terminator Salvation as "Morrison". He also had roles in movies such as Let Me In, Cowboys & Aliens, The Last Stand, The Book of Eli, and Wild Card.

He plays Aryan Brotherhood member "Redwood" in the prison movie Shot Caller, directed by Ric Roman Waugh.

Brownings's television work includes season three of Ray Donovan. He also appeared in episodes of HBO's Westworld, Agent Carter, Supergirl, Major Crimes, CSI, Graceland, Castle, Bones, The Bridge, three episodes of From Dusk till Dawn: The Series, and as the character "Gogo" in the fifth season of Sons of Anarchy.

Browning was also a voice actor in the 2017 video game Call of Duty: WWII. He voiced the main character's deceased older brother Paul Thomas Daniels.

== Personal life ==
Browning has two daughters with ex-wife Sarah Browning, born in 2006 and 2011. With his second wife, Chrissy Lucia, he had twins, a boy and a girl; however, his son died shortly after birth. As of 2025, Browning is in a relationship with actress Natasha Henstridge.

== Filmography ==
=== Film ===
Year	Title	Role
2007	3:10 to Yuma	Crawley
2007	In the Valley of Elah	Checker Box Bartender
2008	Tennessee	Bouncer
2008	Felon	Danny Sampson
2008	Beer for My Horses	Deputy Stippens
2008	Linewatch	Ron Spencer
2008	Shoot First and Pray You Live	Garry Patterson
2009	Terminator Salvation	Morrison
2009	Dark Country	Stranger
2010	The Book of Eli	Hijack Leader
2010	Friendship!	Jonathan
2010	Beneath the Dark	Frank
2010	Passion Play	Cecil
2010	Let Me In	Jack
2011	Cowboys & Aliens	Jed Parker
2012	The Philly Kid	Detective Ray Marks
2013	The Last Stand	"Pony Tail"
2013	Now You See Me	Cell Phone Guy
2014	Road to Paloma	FBI Agent Schaeffer
2014	Mercy	Frank
2014	Palominas	Fargo
2014	Hidden in the Woods	Jed James
2015	Wild Card	Tiel
2016	Shot Caller	Toby "Redwood" Simms
2017	Last Rampage	Randy Greenawalt
2017	Bright	Serling
2018	Donnybrook	McGill
2019	Angel Has Fallen	Militia Man
2019	Greenlight	Bob Moseby
2020	The Unhealer	Coach Gus Whitcomb
2021	Take Back	Jerry Walker
2021	Agnes	Father Black
2023	Invitation to a Murder	Donald Walker
2023	Outlaw Johnny Black	Brett Clayton

=== Television ===
Year(s)	Title	Role	Notes
1991	Silk Stalkings	Phil	
1991	In Living Color		Episode: "My Left Foot of Fury"
1991	Matlock	Peter Vanderhoff	
1994	Hardball	Lloyd Lacombe	
1995–1996	In the House	Clayton	
1996	High Tide	Brad Phillips	
1997–1999	As the World Turns	David Allen Stenbeck	
2005	Into the West	Trooper Long	
2005–2008	Wildfire	Ely / Greg	
2006	The Lost Room	Hospital Orderly	
2008–2009	Easy Money	Detective Yapp	6 episodes
2009	In Plain Sight	Nathan Grady	
2009	Cold Case	Steve Hess	
2010	Scoundrels	Russell Bickley	
2012	The Finder	Tall Man / Ed Beiderman	
2012	Sons of Anarchy	"GoGo"	7 episodes
2013	The Bridge	Jack Childress	2 episodes
2014	Bones	Derek Johannessen	
2014, 2019	The 100	Jake Griffin	4 episodes
2014	Castle	Biker	Episode "For Better or Worse"
2014	Graceland	Billy	
2014	CSI: Crime Scene Investigation	Martin Fox	
2015	Ray Donovan	Gary Royal	Episode "The Kalamazoo"
2015	Major Crimes	"Mustache"	
2015	From Dusk till Dawn: The Series	Nathan Blanchard	3 episodes
2015	Supergirl	Ben Krull / Reactron	Episode: "Fight or Flight"
2016	Agent Carter	Rufus Hunt	3 episodes: "A View in the Dark" "Better Angels", "Smoke & Mirrors"
2016	Westworld	Holden	2 episodes: "The Stray", "Dissonance Theory"
2016	Timeless	James Bowie	Episode: "The Alamo"
2019	Bosch	Preston Borders	5 episodes
2021	S.W.A.T.	Otto Brady	
2021	NCIS	NCIS REACT Supervisory Special Agent Tom Dalton	Episode: "Blown Away"
2021	CSI: Vegas	Damian Locke	
2022–2023	National Treasure: Edge of History	Matty	
2022–2023	The Lincoln Lawyer	Teddy Vogel	Recurring Cast
2023	Bosch: Legacy	Preston Borders	2 episodes
2023	Heels	Jimmy-John / Slinger	
2025	Tracker	Francis Gable	Episode: “Angel”
2025	Fallout	Grand Canyon Elder	Episode: "The Golden Rule"

=== Video games ===
Year(s)	Title	Role
2017	Call of Duty: WWII	Paul Thomas Daniels
2022	God of War Ragnarök	Surtr
