= Matt Kean (disambiguation) =

Matt Kean (born 1981) is an Australian politician.

Matt Keane, Matthew Keane, Matt Kean, or Matthew Kean may also refer to:

- Matt Kean (musician), English bassist in the band Bring Me the Horizon
- Matthew Keane, character played by Jason James Richter
- Matt Keane, Irish footballer in Kerry F.C.
