= Stuart Margolin =

American actor, director, and writer (1940–2022)

- Margolin in Lanigan's Rabbi, 1976
- Born: January 31, 1940; Davenport, Iowa, U.S.
- Died: December 12, 2022 (aged 82); Staunton, Virginia, U.S.
- Occupations: Actor; director; screenwriter
- Years active: 1961–2022
- Spouse(s): Patricia Dunne Martini (m. 1982)
- Children: 3 (stepchildren); including Max Martini

Stuart Margolin (January 31, 1940 – December 12, 2022) was an American actor, director, and screenwriter. He was known for playing Evelyn "Angel" Martin on the 1970s television series The Rockford Files, winning two Emmy Awards for Outstanding Supporting Actor in a Drama Series. He received an additional two Emmy nominations for his directing work, and was also a Directors Guild of America Award winner.

== Early life ==
Margolin was born January 31, 1940, in Davenport, Iowa, to Morris and Gertrude Kalina Margolin but spent much of his childhood in Dallas, Texas. His family was of Russian Jewish descent. Margolin stated that he led a "hoodlum" childhood, was kicked out of Texas public schools, and was sent by his parents to St. Andrews boarding school (now St. Andrew's Sewanee School), in St. Andrews, Tennessee, located just outside of Sewanee, Tennessee. During that time, his family moved to Arizona, to which he moved after his release from reform school. Soon after, Margolin relocated to Dallas. His parents arranged for him to attend private school there.

== Acting career ==
Margolin played the recurring character Evelyn "Angel" Martin, the shifty friend and former jailmate of Jim Rockford (James Garner) on The Rockford Files, whose various cons and schemes usually got Rockford in hot water. Margolin was earlier paired with Garner in the Western series Nichols (1971–72), in which he played a character somewhat similar to Angel. Margolin won the Primetime Emmy Award for Outstanding Supporting Actor in a Drama Series in 1979 and 1980, making him one of five actors to win this award twice for the same role.

In 1969, Margolin wrote and co-produced The Ballad of Andy Crocker, an ABC television movie that was one of the first films to deal with the subject matter of Vietnam veterans coming home. He also co-wrote the title song and had an uncredited cameo in the film. Margolin also took an uncredited role as the Station Wagon Driver in Heroes, another story about Vietnam veterans dealing with what is now termed PTSD.

Margolin played Rabbi David Small in the 1976 TV movie, Lanigan's Rabbi, based on the series of mystery novels written by Harry Kemelman. Scheduling conflicts prevented him continuing in the role in the short-lived TV series of the same name that aired in 1977 as part of The NBC Sunday Mystery Movie, in which the character was played by Bruce Solomon.

In 1990–92, Margolin starred in the 26-episode Canadian comedy-drama television series Mom P.I. as Bernie, a street-smart private investigator who grudgingly helps single mom and waitress Sally Sullivan (Rosemary Dunsmore) solve crimes.

Margolin also appeared in the 2009 CTV/CBS police drama series The Bridge and as bail jumper Stanley Wescott in the episode "The Overpass" (Season 5 Episode 2; 2013) of the CBC Television series Republic of Doyle, which was itself inspired by The Rockford Files. While not a wholesale recreation of the Angel Martin character, his role sported many similar attributes. The episode also featured Margolin's stepson, Max Martini

Margolin also appeared in feature films, including Kelly's Heroes, Death Wish, Futureworld, The Big Bus, and S.O.B.

== Directing career ==
Margolin directed episodes of The Mary Tyler Moore Show, Sara, The Love Boat, Magnum, P.I., Bret Maverick, Quantum Leap, Wonder Woman. and Northern Exposure, and in addition to acting in The Rockford Files, also directed "Dirty Money, Black Light" (1977), "Caledonia – It's Worth a Fortune!" (1974), "The Rockford Files: Friends and Foul Play" (1996), and "The Rockford Files: If It Bleeds... It Leads" (1998).

He won the 1996 DGA Award for children's programming for directing Salt Water Moose, and was nominated for the same award for The Sweetest Gift. He was also nominated for a DGA Award for drama series direction for a 1991 episode of Northern Exposure entitled "Goodbye to All That". He directed, co-starred in, and scored The Glitter Dome (1984) for HBO Pictures.

== Other ==
Margolin wrote several songs with and for his longtime friend, singer-songwriter Jerry Riopelle, that appeared on Riopelle's albums. Margolin was associated with Riopelle's late 1960s band the Parade, co-writing songs and playing percussion on various tracks. He and Riopelle (along with Shango member Tommy Reynolds) co-wrote Shango's 1969 Caribbean-flavored novelty record "Day After Day (It's Slippin' Away)", which hit No. 39 in Canada and also made the Top 100 in the US.

Margolin's songs were covered by R. B. Greaves and Gary Lewis and the Playboys. Riopelle released eight solo albums between 1971 and 1982, all of which contained at least one song written or co-written by Margolin. In turn, Margolin released a solo album in 1980, And the Angel Sings, featuring his interpretations of Margolin and/or Riopelle compositions first recorded by Riopelle.

Starting in 2004, Margolin was a regular participant in the theater program at the Chautauqua Institution.

== Personal life ==
He married Patricia Dunne Martini in 1982. He had three stepchildren: actor Max Martini, costume designer Michelle Martini, and editor/producer/director Christopher Martini.

He was the younger brother of Emmy-winning director/producer/writer Arnold Margolin, both of them lived in Lewisburg, West Virginia, and acted together there in a professional community theater production of Laughter on the 23rd Floor.

Margolin was frequently misidentified as the brother of actress Janet Margolin (1943–1993); the two were not related, although they appeared together as husband and wife in the pilot for the 1977 TV series Lanigan's Rabbi.

For 22 years, Margolin, his wife and stepchildren lived on Salt Spring Island in British Columbia.

== Illness and death ==
According to stepdaughter Michelle Martini, Margolin was diagnosed with pancreatic cancer in 2012. He died in Staunton, Virginia, on December 12, 2022.

== Selected filmography ==
Films

- Women of the Prehistoric Planet (1966) – Chief
- Don't Just Stand There! (1968) – Remy
- The Gamblers (1970) – Goldy
- Kelly's Heroes (1970) – Little Joe
- Limbo (1972) – Phil Garrett
- The Stone Killer (1973) – Lawrence
- Death Wish (1974) – Ames Jainchill
- The California Kid (1974, TV Movie) – Deputy
- The Gambler (1974) – Cowboy
- The Big Bus (1976) – Alex
- Futureworld (1976) – Harry
- Heroes (1977) – Motorist at Garage (uncredited)
- Days of Heaven (1978) – Mill Foreman
- S.O.B. (1981) – Gary Murdock
- Class (1983) – Balaban
- A Killer in the Family (1983, TV Movie) – Randy Greenawalt
- Running Hot (1984) – Officer Trent
- The Glitter Dome (1984, TV Movie) – Herman Sinclair
- A Fine Mess (1986) – Maurice 'Binky' Drundza
- Iron Eagle II (1988) – Gen. Stillmore
- Bye Bye Blues (1989) – Slim Godfrey
- Deep Sleep (1990) – Bob
- Guilty by Suspicion (1991) – Abe Barron
- Impolite (1992) – I.M. Penner
- The Lay of the Land (1997) – Carmine Ficcone
- The Hi-Line (1999) – Clyde Johnson
- The Hoax (2006) – Martin Ackerman
- Arbitrage (2012) – Syd Felder
- The Discoverers (2012) – Stanley Birch
- The Second Time Around (2016) – Isaac
- Sgt. Will Gardner (2019) – Mr. Glenn
- What the Night Can Do (2020) – Hugh Dryer

Television (acting)

- The Gertrude Berg Show – Lester Wexler – Episode "Lonely Sunday" (1961)
- Ensign O'Toole – Lt. Miller – 4 episodes (1962)
- The Lieutenant – Cpl. Merle Purveau – Episode "A Very Private Affair" (1963)
- Burke's Law – Young Man – Episode "Who Killed Sweet Betsy?" (1963)
- Channing – 2 episodes (1963/1964)
- The Fugitive – Jimmy – Episode "The End Game" (1964)
- 12 O'Clock High – "Mutiny at Ten Thousand Feet" (1965)
- Gunsmoke – “The Storm” (S11E2) - Hays City Sheriff (1965)
- Occasional Wife – Bernie Kramer (1966/1967)
- The Virginian – Abe Yeager (1967)
- That Girl – Dr. Phillip L. Priddy / Leonard Stanley / Talley (1968)
- It Takes a Thief – Sagalis / Dimitri Stavro / Prison Chaplain (1968)
- The Monkees (1968) – Captain in S2:E17, "Monkees Watch Their Feet
- Love, American Style (1969) – "Love and the Comedy Team"
- Bewitched (1968) — “A Prince of a Guy”
- The Partridge Family – Hank; Snake (1970/1972)
- Nichols (1971–1972) – Mitch
- The Mary Tyler Moore Show (1973) – Warren Sturgis – Episode "Romeo and Mary"
- Cannon (1973) – Roger Henry – Episode "Press Pass to the Slammer"
- Gunsmoke – Brownie (1974)
- Rhoda – Dr. Arthur Alborn - Episode "If You Want to Shoot the Rapids, You Have to Get Wet" (1975)
- M*A*S*H
  - Season 1 (1972): 'Bananas, Crackers and Nuts' – Capt. Phillip Sherman
  - Season 2 (1973): 'Operation Noselift' – Major Stanley "Stosh" Robbins
- The Rockford Files – Evelyn "Angel" Martin (1974–1979)
- Bret Maverick (1981) – Philo Sandeen
- Magnum, P.I. – Rod Crysler – Episode "...by its cover" (1983)
- The Fall Guy - Ace Cochran - Episode "The Molly Sue" (1983)
- Hill Street Blues – Andy Sedita – Season 6 episodes "Hacked to Pieces" and "Seoul on Ice" (1985)
- Mom P.I. (1990–1992) – Bernie Fox
- Matlock – Nelson Adelson – Episodes – The Evening News parts 1 and 2 (1992)
- "Da Vinci's Inquest" - Season 4, Episode 2, Oppenheimer Park (2001)
- Stone Undercover – Jack Welsh – 26 episodes (2002–2004)
- Intelligence (2006) – Flannegan – Recurring
- 30 Rock (2009) – Fred
- Republic of Doyle – Stanley Westcott (2013)
- NCIS – Felix Betts (2014)
- The X-Files – Dr. They (2018) Episode "The Lost Art of Forehead Sweat"
