= Hardball (1994 TV series) =

Television series

- Created by: Jeff Martin; Kevin Curran
- Starring: Bruce Greenwood; Mike Starr; Alexandra Wentworth; Dann Florek; Joe Rogan; Phill Lewis; Steve Hytner; Chris Browning; Rose Marie
- Composer: Jonathan Wolff
- Country of origin: United States
- Original language: English
- No. of seasons: 1
- No. of episodes: 9

Production
- Running time: 30 minutes
- Production companies: Interbang, Inc. Magic Beans, Inc. Touchstone Television

Original release
- Network: Fox
- Release: September 4 – November 4, 1994

Hardball is an American baseball sitcom that aired Sunday nights at 8:30 pm on Fox from September 4, 1994, to November 4, 1994. The series premiered in the middle of the 1994–95 Major League Baseball strike and was canceled around the time that the year's World Series would have been played. YouTube channel "Baseball's Not Dead" published a 30 minute video detailing the series in September 2023 which caused a minor cult following of people revisiting the show.

== Plot ==
The series focused on the players and staff of the Pioneers, a fictional American League baseball team. Among those shown were pitcher Dave Logan, who has been largely overlooked by MLB; catcher Mike Widmer, who is past his prime; team owner Mitzi Balzer, who is sharp-tongued and trying to get her team out of last place; public relations girl Lee Emory, who has her hands full with Mitzi and the team; and centerfielder Frank Valente, whose cocky high-priced "superstar" ways put him at odds with Dave. The first episode showed Mitzi firing the manager and replacing him with a timid man named Ernest "Happy" Talbot, who is unsure how to get the Pioneers working as a team.

== Cast ==
- Bruce Greenwood as Dave Logan
- Mike Starr as Mike Widmer
- Alexandra Wentworth as Lee Emory
- Dann Florek as Ernest "Happy" Talbot
- Joe Rogan as Frank Valente
- Phill Lewis as Arnold Nixon
- Steve Hytner as Brad Coolidge
- Chris Browning as Lloyd LaCombe
- Rose Marie as Mitzi Balzer
- Adam Hendershott as Nelson Balzer

== Episodes ==
No.	Title	Directed by	Written by	Original release date
1	"Pilot"	John Whitesell & Peter Baldwin	Kevin Curran & Jeff Martin	September 4, 1994
2	"Mike's Release"	Peter Baldwin	Tracy Newman & Jonathan Stark	September 11, 1994
3	"The Butt Winnick Story"	Peter Baldwin	Bill Freiberger	September 18, 1994
4	"Whose Strike Is It Anyway?"	Peter Baldwin	Mike Barker & Matt Weitzman	October 2, 1994
5	"Frank Buys an Island, Mike Pays the Price"	Peter Baldwin	Lona Williams	October 9, 1994
6	"Lee's Bad, Bad Day"	Gil Junger	Lona Williams	October 16, 1994
7	"My Name is Hard B."	Gerry Cohen	Bill Freiberger	October 23, 1994
8	"See Spot Run"	Unknown	Unknown	October 30, 1994
9	"The Rookie, the Batgirl, the Coach and His Wife"	Unknown	Unknown	November 4, 1994
