= Slow Burn (1989 film) =

1989 film directed by John Eyres

- Directed by: John Eyres
- Written by: Stephen Lister
- Produced by: Stephen Chang; John A. Curtis; John Eyres; Zafar Malik (exec prod); Lloyd Simandl (exec prod)
- Starring: William Smith; Anthony James; Scott Anderson; Ivan Rogers; Thom Schioler; Melissa J. Conroy; Stephen M.D. Chang
- Cinematography: Nathaniel Massey
- Edited by: Derek Whelan
- Music by: Alan Grey
- Release date: 1989
- Language: English

Slow Burn is a 1989 film directed by John Eyres and starring Ivan Rogers, William Smith, Anthony James and Stephen M.D. Chang. A veteran cop's partner is killed by a Mafia hitman, and he goes after him. Also on the trail of the hitman is a rookie cop who has his own personal reasons for pursuing him.

== Story ==
A veteran cop has the task of preventing two rival criminal organizations from warring with each other. The two organizations happen to be the Mafia and the Triads. Besides this, the cop is also pursuing a hitman who is also being pursued by a less experienced cop. The veteran cop has no idea that rookie cop who has put himself in a close position to the hit man's boss is after the same target. The Mafia don was played by William Smith and the hitman Emilio Renzetti played by Anthony James.

== Personnel ==
=== Cast ===
- Ivan Rogers ... Murphy
- William Smith ... Antonio Scarpelli
- Anthony James ... Renzetti
- Scott Anderson ... Gino
- Melissa J. Conroy ... Lisa
- Thom Schioler ... Babe
- Stephen M.D. Chang ... Sun Cheng
- Don Kline ... Corigliano
- Mervon Bowman ... Drug Dealer
- William Britos ... Drug Dealer
- Frank Wilson ... Captain Fahey
- Paul McLean ... Patterson
- Michael Tiernan ... O'Brien
- Gerry Vivash ... Petrie
- Keith Beardwood ... Silverman

=== Crew ===
- Steven Lister ... Screenwriter
- Geoff Griffiths ... Producer
- John Eyres ... Director, producer, executive producer
- John A Curtis ... Executive producer
- Zafar Malik ... Executive producer
- Nathaniel Massey ... Director Of Photography
- Alan M Trow ... Camera Operator

== Technical and release information ==
Slow Burn was released in Belgium in 1990 on Excalibur Video. One piece of movie-related material bears the line, "In Chinatown, The Only Thing That Runs Deeper Than Tradition Is Blood".
