= Arnold Margolin (television producer) =

American TV producer and director, and screenwriter

- Occupations: television producer, screen writer, and television director
- Years active: 1965–2014

Arnold Margolin is an American television producer, screen writer, and director. He is the older brother of actor Stuart Margolin.

He was executive producer of Love, American Style, and shared composition credits for the theme song along with Charles Fox. He also wrote 5 episodes of That Girl
