= Love, American Style =

American television series (1969–1974)

- Genre: Romantic comedy; Anthology
- Starring: Varied per episode
- Theme music composer: Charles Fox; Arnold Margolin
- Country of origin: United States
- No. of seasons: 5
- No. of episodes: 108 (list of episodes)

Production
- Running time: 42–44 minutes (1969–70 and 1971–74); 22–25 minutes (1970–71)
- Production companies: Parker-Margolin Productions, Inc.; Paramount Television

Original release
- Network: ABC
- Release: September 29, 1969 – January 11, 1974

Related
- Happy Days; Wait Till Your Father Gets Home

Love, American Style is an American anthology comedy television series that aired on ABC from September 29, 1969, to January 11, 1974. The series was produced by Paramount Television. During the 1971–72 and 1972–73 seasons, it was a part of ABC's Friday primetime lineup that included The Brady Bunch, The Partridge Family, Room 222, and The Odd Couple. It featured some of the earliest work of future stars Diane Keaton ("Love and the Pen Pals"), Sally Struthers ("Love and the Triangle"), Albert Brooks ("Love and Operational Model"), and Harrison Ford ("Love and the Former Marriage").

== History ==
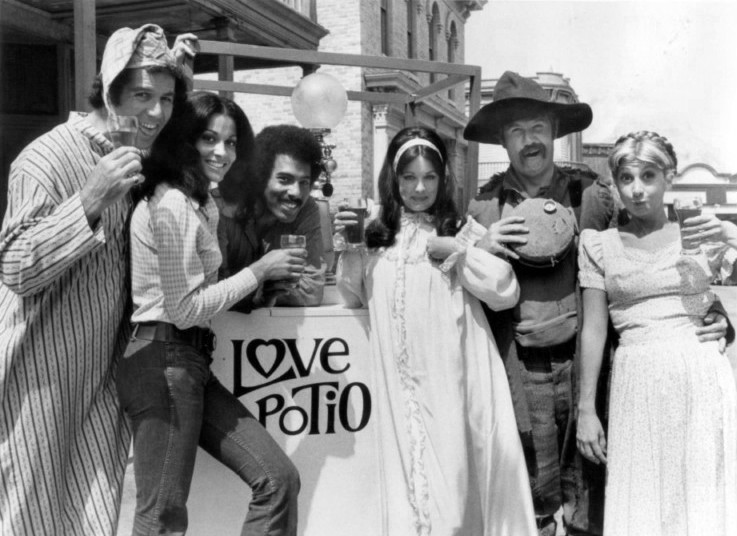
The troupe in 1973

Each episode of the show featured multiple stories of romance, usually with a comedic spin. Episodes were stand-alone, featuring various characters, stories and locations. The show often featured the same actors playing different characters in many episodes. In addition, a large, ornate brass bed was a recurring prop in many episodes.

Charles Fox's music score, featuring flutes, harp and flugelhorn set to a contemporary pop beat, provided the "love" ambiance, which tied the stories together as a multifaceted romantic comedy each week. For the first season, the theme song was performed by the Cowsills. Beginning with the second season, the same theme song was sung by the Ron Hicklin Singers, also known as the voices behind the Partridge Family (based on the Cowsills), among others, featuring brothers John and Tom Bahler (billed as the Charles Fox Singers). This second version of the theme was kept for the remainder of the series, as well as on most episodes prepared for syndication.

The title is loosely derived from a 1961 Italian comedy film called Divorzio all'italiana (Divorce, Italian Style), which received Academy Award nominations in 1962 for Best Director for Pietro Germi and for Best Actor for star Marcello Mastroianni. The film was later spoofed in 1967 by Divorce, American Style, starring Dick Van Dyke. The snowclone "(xxx), (nationality) Style" became a minor cultural catch-phrase as the 1960s progressed.

The original series was also known for its 10- to 20-second blackouts between the featured segments. These were performed by a house troupe that featured future Rockford Files cast member Stuart Margolin, future Vega$ leading lady Phyllis Davis and a young character actor, James Hampton, who was known to television audiences of the era as Private Dobbs from the TV series F-Troop. These clips allowed the show to be padded to the required length without adding to the main segments. They generally consisted of risqué, burlesque-style comedy-of-manners visual jokes.

During its first four years on ABC, Love, American Style was popular with viewers and received decent ratings, although it never ranked among the top 30 shows in the Nielsens. For a few seasons, it was part of a lineup of ABC Friday night programs that included The Brady Bunch, The Partridge Family, Room 222, and The Odd Couple.

Some of the show's segments also served as pilots for proposed television series. Many never made it beyond the pilot stage, but two resulted in a series:

- On February 11, 1972, the show presented the animated segment "Love and the Old-Fashioned Father." This would become the pilot to a first-run syndicated animated series by Hanna-Barbera, Wait Till Your Father Gets Home, which debuted that fall.
- Two weeks later, on February 25, 1972, the show aired a segment titled "Love and the Television Set", a story about Richie Cunningham, his family and friends. The premise and characters were later used for the 1974 television series Happy Days, and the episode would later be recognized as a de facto pilot for the series. (It had originally been produced as a pilot for New Family in Town, which was not picked up). For syndication, the segment was retitled "Love and the Happy Days." Happy Days, in turn, launched an extensive franchise of spinoffs into the 1980s.

The series was also flexible enough to include repurposed pilots that had already failed or been retooled. One first-season example was "Love and the Good Deal," which was actually the original, unaired pilot for the sitcom adaptation of the Neil Simon play and movie Barefoot in the Park, with a different cast than the series.

At the start of the 1973–1974 fall season, the ratings for Love, American Style and Room 222 had plummeted. As a result, both shows were canceled mid-season. The series received several Emmy nominations, including two for Best Comedy Series for 1969–70 and 1970–71. The show subsequently became a daytime standard on ABC from June 1971 to May 1974, and later in syndication, since it was readily edited down to a half-hour by the proper interweaving of the clips with a main segment. It effectively made nine seasons out of five. This allowed for heavy stripping.

== Guest stars ==
Maud Adams

Steve Allen

Eddie "Rochester" Anderson

Anne Archer

Eve Arden

John Astin

Pamela Austin

Frankie Avalon

Jim Backus

Max Baer Jr.

Milton Berle

Ken Berry

Ted Bessell

Carl Betz

Bill Bixby

Whitney Blake

Sonny Bono

Tom Bosley

Joyce Bulifant

Red Buttons

Ruth Buzzi

Edd Byrnes

Judy Carne

Jack Cassidy

Cher

Robert Clary

Hans Conried

Bert Convy

Jackie Coogan

Wally Cox

Yvonne Craig

Broderick Crawford

Bob Crane

Scatman Crothers

Abby Dalton

Ann B. Davis

Phyllis Davis

Richard Dawson

Richard Deacon (actor)

Bob Denver

Brandon deWilde

Phyllis Diller

Donna Douglas

Tony Dow

Cass Elliot

Diana Ewing

Shelley Fabares

Mike Farrell

Norman Fell

Joe Flynn (American actor)

Harrison Ford

Anne Francis

Annette Funicello

George Gobel

Don Grady

Larry Hagman

James Hampton (actor)

Bridget Hanley

Pat Harrington Jr.

Mariette Hartley

Emmaline Henry

Marianna Hill

Sherry Jackson

Arte Johnson

Carolyn Jones

Davy Jones (musician)

Elaine Joyce

Diane Keaton

Jack Klugman

Bernie Kopell

Nancy Kovack

Ruta Lee

Rich Little

Gary Lockwood

Richard Long (actor)

Tina Louise

Paul Lynde

Sue Lyon

Meredith MacRae

Stuart Margolin

Roddy McDowall

Darren McGavin

Jayne Meadows

Burgess Meredith

Mary Ann Mobley

Agnes Moorehead

Harry Morgan

Greg Morris

Robert Morse

Harriet Nelson

Ozzie Nelson

Julie Newmar

Leslie Parrish

Jo Ann Pflug

Edward Platt

Suzanne Pleshette

Stefanie Powers

Vincent Price

Victoria Principal

Charlotte Rae

Tony Randall

Robert Reed

Charles Nelson Reilly

Stafford Repp

Jeannine Riley

Burt Reynolds

Barbara Rush

Kurt Russell

Irene Ryan

Isabel Sanford

Dick Sargent

Avery Schreiber

Tom Smothers

Larry Storch

Sally Struthers

Frank Sutton

George Tobias

Forrest Tucker

Karen Valentine

Vivian Vance

Dick Van Patten

Ray Walston

Nancy Walker

Jessica Walter

Lesley Ann Warren

Carol Wayne

Jo Anne Worley

Flip Wilson

Jesse White (actor)

Cindy Williams

Dana Wynter

== New versions ==
A decade after the show left the air, a new version aired on ABC's daytime schedule from December 23, 1985, to August 15, 1986, entitled New Love, American Style (including an updated version of the theme performed by Lou Rawls), but was canceled after eight months because of low ratings against The Price Is Right on CBS. A third edition, starring Melissa Joan Hart and Mariska Hargitay among others, was shot as a pilot for the 1998–1999 television season, but was not ordered as a series. Nevertheless, ABC aired the pilot on February 20, 1999.

== Nielsen ratings ==
- 1969–70: #58, 13.2 rating
- 1970–71: #47, 17.2 rating
- 1971–72: #33, 19.3 rating
- 1972–73: #41, 18.4 rating
- 1973–74: #75, 11.7 rating

== Home media ==
On November 20, 2007, CBS DVD (distributed by Paramount) released Love, American Style, Season 1 Volume 1 on DVD in Region 1. Season 1, Volume 2 on DVD was released on March 11, 2008.

DVD name	No. of episodes	Release date
Season 1, Volume 1	12	November 20, 2007
Season 1, Volume 2	12	March 11, 2008
