= Cops & Robbersons =

1994 film by Michael Ritchie

- Theatrical release poster
- Directed by: Michael Ritchie
- Written by: Bernie Somers
- Produced by: Ronald L. Schwary; Nancy Graham Tanen; Ned Tanen
- Starring: Chevy Chase; Jack Palance; Dianne Wiest; Robert Davi
- Cinematography: Gerry Fisher
- Edited by: Stephen A. Rotter; William S. Scharf
- Music by: William Ross
- Production company: Channel Productions
- Distributed by: TriStar Pictures
- Release date: April 15, 1994
- Running time: 93 minutes
- Country: United States
- Language: English
- Box office: $11.4 million

Cops & Robbersons is a 1994 American crime comedy film directed by Michael Ritchie, starring Chevy Chase, Jack Palance, Dianne Wiest, Robert Davi and Jason James Richter.

== Plot ==
When the police discover that mob hitman Horace Osborn has moved in next door to the Robbersons, they want to find out what he is up to. So they set up a stakeout in the Robbersons' home. Hard-nosed, tough-as-nails Jake Stone and his young partner Tony Moore are assigned to the stakeout, but now it is a question of whether Jake can last long enough to capture the bad guys. The Robbersons want to help, and by doing so they drive Jake crazy.

== Cast ==
- Chevy Chase as Norman Robberson
- Jack Palance as Detective Jake Stone
- Dianne Wiest as Helen Robberson
- Robert Davi as Horace Osborn
- David Barry Gray as Detective Tony Moore
- Jason James Richter as Kevin Robberson
- Fay Masterson as Cindy Robberson
- Miko Hughes as Billy Robberson
- Richard Romanus as Fred Lutz
- Sal Landi as Jerry Callahan
- Jack Kehler as Caniff
- M. Emmet Walsh as Captain Ted Corbett (uncredited)

== Production ==
The script for Cops & Robbersons was written on spec by Bernie Somers which Channel Productions purchased in August 1992.

Filming began in March 1993 and continued through May of that year.

== Release ==
The film was theatrically released on April 15, 1994. A home video release followed on November 16, 1994.

== Reception ==
Cops & Robbersons received generally negative reviews. On Rotten Tomatoes, it has an approval rating of 18% based on 22 reviews, with an average rating of 3.5/10.

Roger Ebert gave the film two out of four stars, referring to it as "one more variation on the FOW movie, so called because the plot involves a Fish Out of the Water". He singled out a scene in which Chevy Chase's character Norman Robberson smuggles police officers into his home and snatches a cat from his wife Helen (Dianne Wiest), commenting:

Funny? Yes? No? Lucille Ball could pull off moments like that, because you could almost believe she was that desperate, and scatter-brained. Desi Arnaz could almost be fooled by such a moment, because Lucy always had him confused anyway. But Norman and Helen Robberson? Watching the movie, I knew I was supposed to laugh, but all I could think of was: what did the people making the movie think about this scene while they were filming it? Anything?

Commented Richard Harrington of The Washington Post:

Chevy Chase is lucky Cops and Robbersons isn't a sitcom. If it were, it would be canceled as pronto as his talk show was. The fault is not just Chase's—the plot in this Stakeout clone is a sack of woe—but much of the responsibility is. Someone wrongly advised Chase that it's enough to be the lovably klutzy Chevy, that no acting or effort is necessary. As a result, Norman Robberson is another in a too-long list of overly sedated Chase characters that are nothing to laugh about, or at. That's a serious problem for a comedy.

Chris Hicks of the Deseret News opined that "Norman is the most ridiculous sitcom husband and father to grace the big screen since . . . well, since Clark Griswold, of the National Lampoon's Vacation pictures. And since both Norman and Clark are played by Chevy Chase, why not? They're both dumb and clumsy and have dysfunctional families, and they both pretend that everything's OK. But where the Vacation pictures had some satiric bite to offset the silliness—well, the first one did—Cops and Robbersons is just stupid. Loaded with ill-timed pratfalls and dopey physical shtick, it's movies like this that give slapstick a bad name."

Janet Maslin of The New York Times lamented that the film was "even more unfunny than his disastrous talk show", calling it "a Chase vehicle with four flat tires".

=== Year-end lists ===
- Top 10 worst (listed alphabetically, not ranked) – Mike Mayo, The Roanoke Times

=== Box office ===
The film debuted poorly at the box office, earning $3.7 million and coming in second place behind Four Weddings and a Funeral. The film grossed $11,391,093 in the domestic box office from an unknown budget.
