= Ghost Elephants =

- Theatrical release poster
- Directed by: Werner Herzog
- Produced by: Werner Herzog; Ariel Leon Isacovitch
- Narrated by: Werner Herzog
- Cinematography: Eric Averdung; Roger Horrocks; Rafael Leyva
- Edited by: Marco Capalbo
- Music by: Ernst Reijseger
- Production company: Sobey Road Entertainment
- Distributed by: National Geographic Documentary Films
- Release dates: August 28, 2025 (Venice); February 27, 2026 (United States); March 7, 2026 (Disney+, Hulu)
- Running time: 98 minutes
- Country: United States
- Language: English

Ghost Elephants is a 2025 American documentary film directed by Werner Herzog. It follows Steve Boyes, a South African naturalist in search of what he believes to be an undiscovered species of African elephant on the highland plateau of Angola.

The film had its world premiere out of competition of the 82nd Venice International Film Festival on August 28, 2025. It was theatrically released in the United States by National Geographic Documentary Films on February 27, 2026, followed by its streaming release on Disney+ and Hulu on March 7.

== Cast ==
- Steve Boyes - Ornithologist, Explorer
- Xui - San Bushman Master Tracker
- Kobus - Master Tracker, Healer Apprentice
- Xui Dawid - Master Tracker
- Gary Trower - Anthropologist, San Culture Specialist
- Kerllen Costa - Environmental Anthropologist
- Jordana Meyer - Molecular Ecologist, Stanford University
- Regedor Kaketche - King of the Nkangala
- Elias Ngunga - Luchazi Tracker
- António Luhoke - Luchazi Hunter
- Melissa Hawkins - Curator of Mammals, Smithsonian Institution
- Mary Faith Flores - Molecular Technician, Smithsonian Institution
- Ellie Armstrong - Evolutionary Genomics, UC Riverside
- Katherine Solari - Conservation Genomics, Stanford University

== Release ==
Ghost Elephants was presented in Features at the Vienna International Film Festival on October 18, 2025. It screened in the Masters section of the Stockholm International Film Festival on November 6, 2025. The UK premiere was at the Leeds International Film Festival on November 14, 2025.

In August 2025, National Geographic Documentary Films acquired the world streaming rights to the film and it will be globally available to stream on Disney+ and Hulu in 2026.

== Reception ==
On the review aggregator website Rotten Tomatoes, 98% of 43 critics' reviews are positive, with an average rating of 8.2/10. The website's consensus reads: "A visually magnificent tribute to humanity's fascination with animals, Ghost Elephants is a haunting documentary that reaffirms how much any subject becomes all the more intriguing when beheld by Werner Herzog's gaze." Metacritic, which uses a weighted average, assigned the film a score of 79 out of 100, based on six critics, indicating "generally favorable" reviews.

Peter Sobczynski of RogerEbert.com gave the film four out of four stars and wrote, "Ghost Elephants is a portrait of obsession that, while gentler than some of Herzog's other works, is mesmerizing from the first moment to the last, yet another title of note in what remains one of the most incredible filmographies of our time."
