= Tison v. Arizona =

- Supreme Court of the United States

Argued November 3, 1986 Decided April 21, 1987
- Full case name: Raymond and Ricky Tison v. State of Arizona
- Citations: 481 U.S. 137 (more) 107 S. Ct. 1676; 95 L. Ed. 2d 127; 1987 U.S. LEXIS 1808

Case history
- Prior: Convictions affirmed by the Supreme Court of Arizona, 633 P.2d 335 (Ariz. 1981), and denial of post-conviction relief affirmed by the Supreme Court of Arizona, 690 P.2d 747 (Ariz. 1984); cert. granted, 475 U.S. 1010 (1986).

Holding
- The death penalty may be imposed due to the felony murder rule on a murder defendant who did not intend to cause the death, but was a major participant in the underlying felony and exhibits extreme indifference to human life.

Court membership
- Chief Justice William Rehnquist Associate Justices William J. Brennan Jr. · Byron White; Thurgood Marshall · Harry Blackmun; Lewis F. Powell Jr. · John P. Stevens; Sandra Day O'Connor · Antonin Scalia

Case opinions
- Majority: O'Connor, joined by Rehnquist, White, Powell, Scalia
- Dissent: Brennan, joined by Marshall; Blackmun, Stevens (parts I, II, III, IV-A)

Laws applied
- U.S. Const. amend. VIII

Tison v. Arizona, 481 U.S. 137 (1987), is a United States Supreme Court case in which the Court qualified the rule it set forth in Enmund v. Florida (1982). Just as in Enmund, in Tison the Court applied the proportionality principle to conclude that the death penalty was an appropriate punishment for a felony murderer who was a major participant in the underlying felony and exhibited a reckless indifference to human life.

== Factual background ==
This case stems from an infamous prison break during the summer of 1978. Gary Tison was serving a life sentence at the Arizona State Prison in Florence for killing a prison guard. His three sons, Donald, Ricky, and Raymond, plotted to break him and his cellmate, Randy Greenawalt, out of prison. On July 30, 1978, the sons entered the prison for a visit, taking advantage of a policy that allowed an informal picnic setting for weekend family visits, carrying an ice chest packed with revolvers and sawed-off shotguns. One of them aimed a sawed-off shotgun at a lobby guard. Greenawalt helped in the escape by cutting off telephones and alarm systems.

They escaped in Donald Tison's 1969 Lincoln Continental, but the next day, one of the Lincoln's tires blew out on a stretch of road not far from the California border, near Quartzsite. Marine Sgt. John Lyons, 24, of Yuma, traveling with his wife, son, and niece on his way to visit family in Nebraska, stopped to help.

While Raymond Tison was showing John Lyons the flat tire, the other escapees emerged from the brush. Raymond forced the Lyonses into the Lincoln, and then he and Donald drove the Lincoln down a service road. Meanwhile, the other Tisons transferred their belongings into the Lyonses' car, keeping the Lyonses' money and guns. Gary Tison shot out the radiator on the Lincoln and forced the Lyonses out. Gary Tison remarked that he was "thinking about" killing the Lyonses. Gary told Raymond and Ricky to go back to the Lyonses' car and get some water. According to Raymond, while they were gone, Gary started shooting the Lyonses; according to Ricky, the shooting began once they returned with the water. The two agreed that they had returned in time to watch the elder Tison and Greenawalt kill the Lyonses. Their bodies were found five days later.

Then, in Colorado, police believe that on August 8 the gang murdered James Judge Jr. and his new wife, Margene. The Amarillo, Texas couple were honeymooning in southwestern Colorado at the time. (Their bodies were not found until November 1978, at a campsite near Pagosa Springs, Colorado.) The gang returned to Arizona, and were driving the Judges' van on Chuichu Road on the Papago Indian Reservation (now the Tohono Oʼodham Nation), when they encountered a police roadblock. They ran the roadblock, and a shootout took place at a second roadblock, south of Casa Grande, Arizona.

Donald Tison, who was driving the van, was killed at the scene; the others fled on foot. Raymond, Ricky, and Greenawalt were quickly caught, but Gary Tison escaped into the desert. Over 300 police officers and hundreds of volunteers searched for him, but he eluded them. His body was found eleven days after the shootout.

Greenawalt and the surviving Tisons were charged with 92 crimes, including four counts of murder. (No charges were brought for the murder of the Judges, and Colorado authorities closed the cases when the surviving gang members were convicted in Arizona.)

== Criminal proceedings ==
The two remaining Tison brothers were tried individually for capital murder in the deaths of the Lyonses. The murder charges were predicated on Arizona's felony-murder statute, which provided that killings that occurred during a robbery or kidnapping were first-degree, death-eligible murders. The Tison brothers were convicted. At a separate sentencing hearing, three aggravating factors were proved: the Tisons had created a grave risk of death to others, the murders were committed for pecuniary gain, and the murders were especially heinous, cruel, or depraved. The Arizona Supreme Court upheld the death sentences. In the intervening years, the Supreme Court decided Enmund v. Florida, leading the Tison brothers to bring a collateral attack on their sentences, claiming that Enmund required their death sentences to be struck down. The Arizona Supreme Court rejected this argument, asserting that the dictates of Enmund had been satisfied because the intent requirement of that case could be inferred from the fact that death was a foreseeable result of participating in a dangerous felony.

== Holding ==
Justice Sandra Day O'Connor, writing for the majority, concluded that the death penalty would be appropriate for a murder like the ones the Tisons had been convicted of if it could be shown that the defendant was a major participant in the underlying felony and had acted with reckless indifference to human life. In Kennedy v. Louisiana, 554 U.S. 407 (2008), the Court added with respect to the defendants in Tison it "allowed the defendants’ death sentences to stand where they did not themselves kill the victims but their involvement in the events leading up to the murders was active, recklessly indifferent, and substantial."

The death sentences of Ricky and Raymond Tison were both reduced to life in prison on appeal. Greenawalt was executed in 1997.

== In popular media ==
The 1978 escape has been the subject of two films:

- A Killer in the Family, a 1983 TV movie starring Robert Mitchum as Gary Tison and James Spader as his oldest son Donny. Eric Stoltz played Ricky, Lance Kerwin played Ray, and Stuart Margolin played Randy Greenawalt.
- Last Rampage, a 2017 film starring Robert Patrick as Gary Tison and Heather Graham as his wife Dorothy based on the book Last Rampage: The Escape of Gary Tison by James W. Clarke
- The story was also the subject of the Investigation Discovery series Evil Kin Season 3 eighth episode, "Road Kill."
- In Barbet Schroeder's film Reversal of Fortune, protagonist Alan Dershowitz is trying to save two young brothers from the electric chair in Alabama, based on the case of the Tison brothers in Arizona. The brothers, who are called Johnson and are African Americans in the movie script, helped their father escape from prison, and were charged with felony murder when he committed murder soon after. The closing credits state that the "Johnson brothers" (as of the film's release in 1990) "remain on death row".
