= The Serpent Warriors =

1987 American-Hong Kong film by John Howard and Niels Rasmussen

- Directed by: John Howard; Niels Rasmussen
- Written by: Martin Wise
- Produced by: Frank Wong; Philip Marcus
- Starring: Clint Walker; Eartha Kitt; Christopher Mitchum; Anne Lockhart; Kathleen Lu; Yuen Kao; Anita Merritt
- Cinematography: Greg von Berblinger
- Edited by: Wolfgang Niell; Dwight Rasmussen
- Music by: John Sanders; Bruce Tambling
- Production company: Eastern Media Group
- Distributed by: Embassy Pictures; Cinema International Corporation
- Release date: March 1987
- Running time: 89 min
- Countries: United States; Hong Kong
- Language: English

The Serpent Warriors (also known as The Golden Viper) is a 1987 crime-horror film directed by John Howard and Niels Rasmussen starring Clint Walker, Eartha Kitt, Christopher Mitchum, Anne Lockhart, Kathleen Lu, Yuen Kao and Anita Merritt. The film is an American-Hong Kong co-production.

== Plot ==
A zoologist is called to a construction site that has snakes that was once was the ancient site of a snake-worshiping cult.

== Cast ==
- Clint Walker as Morgan Bates
- Eartha Kitt as Snake Priestess
- Christopher Mitchum as Dr. Tim Muffett
- Anne Lockhart as Laura Chase
- Kathleen Lu as Mrs. King
- Yuen Kao as Jason King
- Anita Merritt as Serpent Princess

== Production ==
=== Filming locations ===
The Serpent Warriors was filmed in Nevada and Taiwan.

== Reception ==
=== Critical response ===
Paul Freitag-Fey of the Daily Grindhouse wrote in his review: "In other words, Serpent Warriors is exactly the mess of a movie that you’d expect from a film created by three different sources each with their own plot and characters." He could not figure out how Eartha Kitt was cast in the film as "it’s a bit puzzling that her film career was so… varied."
