= Laserhawk =

Canadian science fiction movie from 1997

- Directed by: Jean Pellerin
- Written by: John A. Curtis
- Produced by: John A. Curtis; Peter Kroonenburg
- Starring: Jason James Richter; Melissa Galianos; Gordon Currie; Mark Hamill; Ivan Rogers
- Cinematography: Eric Moynier
- Edited by: Peter Svab
- Music by: Michael Richard Plowman; Daniel Séguin (theme)
- Production companies: Screen Partners; Greenlight Communications; Everest Motion Pictures; Kingsborough Greenlight Pictures
- Distributed by: Alliance Atlantis Communications (Canada); York Entertainment (U.S.)
- Release dates: July 27, 1999 (Canada); October 9, 1999 (U.S.)
- Running time: 99 minutes
- Country: Canada
- Language: English
- Budget: CAD$7–8.4 million

Laserhawk is a 1998 Canadian science fiction film directed by Jean Pellerin and starring Jason James Richter, Melissa Galianos, Gordon Currie and Mark Hamill. It concerns two teenagers who must team up with a comic book writer and a mental patient to save mankind from destruction at the hands of aliens. More ambitious than the average Canadian-shot genre film at the time, it had a troubled production and only saw a late, small screen release.

== Plot ==
Nerdy Wisconsin teen Zach Raymond gains fame in his area and at high school after allegedly videotaping a UFO with unprecedented quality. Soon, however, Col. Lewis Teagarden of the U.S. Army comes to investigate his claim, and he discovers that Zach faked the footage using a green screen and a homemade UFO model. Dejected and outed as a fraud, Zach gets a job at a local diner and there meets Cara, a goth girl who is also a huge comic book fan. She tells him he shouldn't have taken the UFO design straight from her favorite comic book. Though Zach has never seen this comic before, the ship looks just like the one he designed.

Zach drives a co-worker home to her trailer in the woods outside of town. Meanwhile, a school bus of students is returning to town from a victorious away football game, and the students are filming their celebration. Zach, driving slowly on the country road, sees a blinding light coming from above and looks up to see a real UFO in the sky. Panicked, he floors the car and runs it into a tree. The UFO, moving on, lifts the school bus using its tractor beam and drops it back into the woods, completely empty.

Additional UFOs begin to appear over the town, abducting townsfolk; all these UFOs resemble the one Zach faked up and the one Cara remembers from her favorite comic, created by M.K. Ultra. When Zach and Cara find Mr. Ultra, he admits that he used to work at the mental hospital before taking up cartooning, and the comic was based on the crazed ravings of a mental patient named Bob. They then discover that Bob, far from being insane, is an alien being reincarnated from 250 million years ago who has been waiting for the invaders to return so he can save the Earth. Zach and Cara discover they are likewise reincarnated aliens and are destined to save the planet from alien invasion.

== Cast ==
- Jason James Richter as Zach
- Melissa Galianos as Cara
- Gordon Currie as M.K.
- Mark Hamill as Bob Sheridan
- Ivan Dale Rogers as Col. Lewis Teagarden
- Joseph Wynne as Roach
- Richard Zeman as Zach's Father
- Susan Almgren as Susan Almgren

== Production ==
=== Development ===
The film was the brainchild of Vancouver-based John Curtis of fledgling producer/distributor Everest Pictures. However, Vancouver was becoming too expensive for the project. Toronto-based Greenlight Communications, a feature film newcomer which had acquired a stake in Everest, brokered a co-production deal with another of its affiliated companies, Peter Kroonenburg's Kingsborough Pictures of Montreal. This was the first co-production between British Columbia and Quebec. Everest and Kingsborough operated under the legal entity Laserbird Films during production. British-based company Screen Partners arranged the film's financing.

Laserhawk was originally budgeted at CAD$3 million, and set to begin filming in December 1995. No cast was announced but Quebec-born director Jean Pellerin, a heavy metal music video director, was already attached in his feature debut. He was joined by his usual cinematographer, Eric Moynier. The film was eventually delayed to late May 1996. The female lead was not yet cast with only weeks to go, before Mélissa Galianos of Boucherville was chosen. Ivan Rogers had previous co-starred in the John Curtis production, Slow Burn. Mark Hamill, who had previously worked for Curtis on the alien thriller Time Runner, was brought back but his participation was kept a secret during the shoot.

=== Filming ===
Principal photography was scheduled between June 4 and July 13, 1996, in the neighboring towns of Saint-Jean-sur-Richelieu and Iberville, Quebec. It was the first film shot there since Bolt in 1993. By production time, the budget was estimated between CAD$4.5 million and 5.2 million. The production contracted 500 to 600 persons overall, of which the core crew comprised about 75 people. It worked five-day weeks for a projected 30 working days. The script required the teenage leads to be present on set for all of them. Richter took the opportunity to familiarize himself with the French language.

Locations spanned various local landmarks such as the Park Lane Café, the Grand Bernier district, the Market Place, Gouin Bridge, rue Richelieu, Armand Racicot Comprensive School and Iberville's 12th Avenue. Historic military sites, the Fort Saint-Jean campus and Saint-Jean Garrison, were also put to use. A disused, now demolished factory ensemble formerly occupied by the Balmet and Singer companies was used for interior sets. The production's temporary headquarters were located inside another former factory on rue Saint-Louis.

During filming, local auto shop owner Réal Hamel was asked if he could paint four vehicles for the next day. He did, and wound up becoming one of Canada's go-to vehicle coordinators as a result of this impromptu request. At the end of the first week, a DAT recorder was stolen at a high school used by the production, causing the loss of a day's worth of audio. As a result, an extra day was added to the schedule for reshoots, and filming wrapped up at the Singer site on July 14, 1996. Shortly after, Richter moved on to Free Willy 3 in Vancouver.

=== Post-production ===
CAD$1 million were earmarked for the visual effects, which originally comprised 120 shots, later bumped up to about 140. Their development was assigned to a pair of companies owned by Greenlight, John Lambert's Motion Works Group, an American company with Vancouver offices, assisted by Montréal's DHD Postimage.

In March 1997, actor Ivan Rogers announced that the picture was nearing completion and would premiere at May's Cannes Film Market. However, it was not screened there, and post-production dragged on at the chronically embattled Motion Works, with insiders reporting budget overruns, numerous departures (including that of an Emmy Award-winning lead designer) and the needless discarding of material by management. Effects work eventually wrapped up in December 1997.

Postmortem discussions pegged the film's cost between CAD$7 million and 8.4 million, with an article calling it arguably the biggest independent project to originate from Western Canada at that point.

== Release ==
The film was originally supposed to get a theatrical release in both Anglophone and Francophone Canada. Everest planned to keep domestic English rights for its distribution arm Everest Releasing. Alliance would receive domestic French rights, although rival France Film was reportedly in the running for them during production.

Quebec producer Peter Kroonenburg announced that a U.S. distribution deal may be struck before the end of production, thanks to Richter's star appeal. By the end of 1996, no deal had been signed, but Kroonenburg indicated that he had received interest from Disney's Dimension Pictures and New Line Cinema. Prior to the February 1998 American Film Market, Everest's Curtis still hoped for a Disney deal. By that time, however, Greenlight's underfinanced entertainment division—including Everest—was falling apart and in March 1998, Alliance also took over the film's international distribution. That summer, Lambert touted a Fall 1998 general release. By the 1999 AFM, the film's rights had been transferred to Curtis' new company Prophecy Entertainment.

=== Advance screenings ===
Alliance Communications gave Laserhawk its world premiere on May 16, 1998, at the Cannes Film Market. It was also screened on August 1, 1998, during the inaugural edition of Fant-Asia Toronto.

=== Home video ===
In Canada, the film was released on home video on July 27, 1999, by Alliance Atlantis Communications. In the U.S., the film was released on VHS and DVD by Maverick Entertainment/York Entertainment on May 23, 2000.

=== Television ===
In the U.S., the film premiered on October 9, 1999, on the Sci-Fi Channel.

== Reception ==
The BBC's RadioTimes wrote that Hamill "lends some doubtful marquee value to a dire sci-fi thriller [...] It was a confused and troubled production from day one and it certainly shows on the screen; it doesn’t help that the all important effects are pretty ho-hum, too." VideoHound's DVD Guide called it "fairly standard sf with some above average special effects. About half of those effects are cheap and lame, and half are cheap and cool." Ballantine Books' DVD & Video Guide wrote that "[y]oung teens are the target audience for this so-so sci-fi adventure with a not-very-believable plot and merely adequate special effects."
