= Wednesday the Rabbi Got Wet =

1976 novel by Harry Kemelman

- First edition
- Author: Harry Kemelman
- Language: English
- Series: Rabbi Small
- Genre: Mystery Novel
- Publisher: William Morrow
- Publication date: 1976
- Publication place: United States
- Media type: Print (Hardback & Paperback)
- OCLC: 12883658

Wednesday the Rabbi Got Wet is a mystery novel written by Harry Kemelman in 1976, one of the Rabbi Small series.

== Plot introduction ==
The fictional hero of the book, David Small, is the unconventional leader of the Conservative Jewish congregation in the fictional suburban Massachusetts town of Barnard's Crossing. As the protagonist of a series of novels, Rabbi Small has wisdom, an unerring sense of Jewish tradition (which can at times put him at odds with the Jewish community when he believes that they are seriously deviating from Judaism) and all the good qualities of a detective sharpened by his Talmudic training, which enables him to see the third side of a problem. He is a devoted husband to his wife and (later in the series) father to his two children Jonathan and Hepsibah. Small's logic, learned from the Talmud, plays an important part in the plots. Usually Small is drawn into the events when they involve a member of his congregation or Barnard's Crossing's Jewish community in general. Among other characters is Hugh Lanigan, the Catholic local police chief, and the two friends often discuss religion over a cup of tea. He has many troubles with his congregation and he is constantly at odds with at least one of its powerful members, usually the Temple President at the time.

== Plot summary ==
Marcus Aptaker, owner of the long-established pharmacy Town-Line Drugs, is in dispute with the Temple Board. The land which his business leases has been willed to the Temple by the late Mr Goralsky. The Board propose to sell it to a big-time real estate operator with other plans. His wife appeals to Rabbi Small, who can do nothing but is concerned that the Temple may be in breach of Halacha. He also opposes their plan to buy a country retreat with the proceeds and employ a rabbi he does not know.

Arnold, Aptaker's estranged son, also a pharmacist, returns home. He has been involved with an ultra-religious group and has adopted the name of Akiva Rokeach, but he and his father clash and he leaves angrily.

An elderly man, Jacob Kestler, dies, ostensibly from a drug-related reaction and suspicion falls on the pharmacy - in particular on Arnold who had been working there. He is arrested by Lanigan, but Rabbi Small is not convinced of Arnold's guilt and proceeds to pinpoint the real culprit.

The land deal does not go ahead and Rabbi Small, who had threatened to resign, remains with the Temple. Arnold remains in Barnard's Crossing and becomes engaged to Leah Kaplan, daughter of Temple President, Chester Kaplan

== Characters ==
- David Small – the Rabbi of the title, protagonist
- Hugh Lanigan – the local police chief
- Miriam Small – the Rabbi's wife
- Marcus Aptaker – pharmacist
- Arnold Aptaker/Akiva Rokeach – son of Marcus
- Chester Kaplan – Temple President
- Leah Kaplan – daughter of Chester

== See also ==
- Friday the Rabbi Slept Late
