= Striking Point =

- Directed by: Thomas H. Fenton
- Written by: Thomas H. Fenton
- Produced by: Bret McCormick
- Starring: Christopher Mitchum; Ivan Rogers; Jeff Blanchard; Mark Hanson; Patrick Swinnea; Bob Flynn; Rocky Patterson; Tracy Spaulding
- Music by: Laura Porter
- Release date: 1995
- Running time: 93 minutes
- Country: United States
- Language: English

Striking Point is an action film directed by Thomas H. Fenton and starring Christopher Mitchum, Ivan Rogers, Stan Morse, Mark Hanson, Tracy Spaulding and Rocky Patterson. It is about detectives in their quest to stop the KGB from bringing in weapons for gangs in the United States.

== Background ==
Even though the cold war is over, the KGB are shipping deadly weapons into the US and supplying street gangs with them, thus priming one of their own. It's up to the determined police detectives to stop them. The lead villain Romanov is played by Christopher Mitchum. The police officers, Captain Matthews and Detective Joe Morris are played by Ivan Rogers and Rocky Patterson.

The April 1, 1995 issue of Billboard recorded it as a new entry at 35 in the Top 40 video rentals.

== Cast ==
- Christopher Mitchum as Colonel Ivan Romanov
- Tracy Spaulding as Tina Wells
- Rocky Patterson as Detective Joe Morris
- Jeff Blanchard as John Burke
- Rob Flynn as Mikial
- Mark Hanson as Vladimir
- Stan Morse as Nick Harris
- Ivan Rogers as Captain Matthews
- Jeremy Schwartz as Mickey
- Patrick Swinnea as Konrad
