= Last Rampage =

- Directed by: Dwight Little
- Screenplay by: Álvaro Rodríguez; Jason Rosenblatt
- Based on: Last Rampage: The Escape of Gary Tison by James W. Clarke
- Produced by: Eric M. Breiman; Robert Patrick
- Starring: Robert Patrick; Heather Graham; Bruce Davison; Alex MacNicoll; Molly C. Quinn; Chris Browning; Casey Thomas Brown; Skyy Moore; Jason Richter; William Shockley; John Heard
- Cinematography: Rafael Leyva
- Edited by: Bill Lynch
- Music by: Tobias Enhus; Richard Patrick
- Production companies: Rampage Films; Vangard Productions
- Distributed by: Epic Pictures Releasing
- Release date: September 22, 2017 (USA)
- Running time: 93 minutes
- Country: United States
- Language: English
- Budget: $6 million
- Box office: $6,294

Last Rampage is a 2017 American crime drama film directed by Dwight Little. The screenplay by Alvaro Rodriguez and Jason Rosenblatt is based on the non-fiction book Last Rampage: The Escape of Gary Tison by University of Arizona Political Science Professor James W. Clarke, and details the true story of Tison's 1978 prison escape and subsequent murders. The film stars Robert Patrick (who also produced the film) as Tison, Heather Graham as his wife Dorothy, and Chris Browning as his accomplice Randy Greenawalt. Bruce Davison plays a fictional law enforcement official pursuing Tison (a composite of several real-world individuals), and Alex MacNicoll, Skyy Moore, and Casey Thomas Brown portray Tison's three sons.

The events were previously depicted in A Killer in the Family, starring Robert Mitchum as Gary Tison, with James Spader, Eric Stoltz and Lance Kerwin as his sons.

== Synopsis ==
The film tells the true story of the infamous prison break of Gary Tison and Randy Greenawalt from the Arizona State prison in Florence, AZ in the summer of 1978.

== Cast ==
- Robert Patrick as Gary Tison
- Heather Graham as Dorothy Tison
- Bruce Davison as Sheriff John Cooper
- Alex MacNicoll as Donald "Donnie" Tison
- Molly C. Quinn as Marissa Fuller
- Skyy Moore as Ricky Tison
- Casey Thomas Brown as Raymond "Ray" Tison
- Chris Browning as Randy Greenawalt
- Jason Richter as Officer Ketchum
- William Shockley as Joe Tison
- John Heard as Blackwell
- Megan Gallagher as Mrs. Cooper
- Tamara Clatterbuck as Carolyn Simmons
- Deb Carson as Mary Jo West
- Garrett Hines as John Lyons
- Michele Martin as Donna Lyons
- Brigitte Hagerman as Margene Judge
- Kevin Joy as James Judge
- Alex Lombard as Judy Tison
- Michael Monks as Eddy
- Ren Montoro as Terry Jo Tyson
- Chris Muto as Tim Darby

== Reception ==
On the review aggregator website Rotten Tomatoes, 60% of 10 critics' reviews are positive, with an average rating of 6.3/10. Metacritic, which uses a weighted average, assigned the film a score of 50 out of 100, based on 5 critics, indicating "mixed or average" reviews.

L.A. Times reviewer Michael Rechtshaffen called Robert Patrick "brutally effective" in a positive review of the film.

== See also ==
- A Killer in the Family, a 1983 film about Gary Tison
