= Lanigan's Rabbi =

1977 American crime drama television series

- Promotional photo, with Bruce Solomon and Art Carney
- Genre: Crime drama
- Written by: Gordon Cotler; Norman Lessing; Don Mankiewicz; Robert Pirosh; Karl Tunberg; Terence Tunberg
- Directed by: John Astin; Joseph Pevney; Leonard B. Stern
- Starring: Art Carney; Stuart Margolin (pilot); Bruce Solomon (series)
- Composer: Don Costa
- Country of origin: United States
- Original language: English
- No. of seasons: 1
- No. of episodes: 4

Production
- Executive producer: Leonard B. Stern
- Producers: Gordon Cotler; Don Mankiewicz; David J. O'Connell
- Cinematography: Isidore Mankofsky
- Running time: 90 minutes

Original release
- Network: NBC
- Release: January 30 – April 24, 1977

Related
- NBC Sunday Mystery Movie

Lanigan's Rabbi is an American police procedural television series that aired on NBC from January 30 to April 24, 1977. The title alludes to Police Chief Paul Lanigan and his friend, Rabbi David Small.

== Synopsis ==
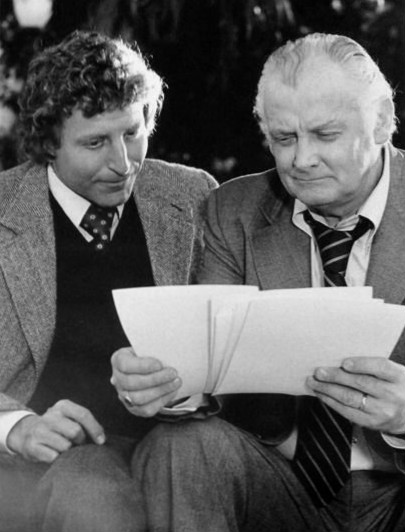
Solomon and Carney

Based upon a series of novels by Harry Kemelman, the series stars Art Carney as Police Chief Paul Lanigan, who fights crime in a small California town with the help of his best friend, Rabbi David Small (Stuart Margolin in the pilot, Bruce Solomon in the series). Small's ability in this area was attributed to his "rabbinic mind", and his Talmudic training. However, an added element for the David Small novels and the Lanigan's Rabbi series was that Small was usually trying to balance his crime-solving assistance to Chief Lanigan with synagogue politics, usually involving some congregants who would be happy to see the rabbi lose his position. Co-starring in the series was Janis Paige and Janet Margolin as Mrs. Lanigan and Mrs. Small, respectively. Another regular on the series was Carney's daughter, Barbara Carney.

After a successful pilot film based on Friday the Rabbi Slept Late, the first novel in the Rabbi David Small series, aired in 1976, Lanigan's Rabbi was produced as a series of 90-minute telefilms beginning in January 1977. For the series, Bruce Solomon replaced Stuart Margolin, who had played Rabbi Small in the pilot; the unrelated Janet Margolin played his wife. The series was broadcast on a rotating schedule under the umbrella title NBC Sunday Mystery Movie. It rotated with Columbo, McCloud, and McMillan (formerly McMillan & Wife). Lanigan's Rabbi was the last series added to the Mystery Movie format (it replaced Quincy, M.E. at mid-season when that series was spun off into a weekly program); in the spring, NBC cancelled all four series and discontinued the Mystery Movie format. As a result, only four Lanigan's Rabbi episodes were broadcast.

== Cast ==
- Art Carney - Chief Paul Lanigan
- Stuart Margolin - Rabbi David Small (pilot)
- Bruce Solomon - Rabbi David Small
- Barbara Carney - Bobbie Whittaker
- Janet Margolin - Miriam Small
- Janis Paige - Kate Lanigan
- Reva Rose - Hannan Prince

== Episode list ==
No.	Title	Directed by	Written by	Original release date
Pilot	"Friday the Rabbi Slept Late"	Lou Antonio	Don Mankiewicz	June 17, 1976
An Irish Catholic police chief and a Jewish rabbi join forces to solve the murder of a housekeeper whose body was discovered by the front entrance of the rabbi's synagogue. Lorraine Gary and Robert Reed guest star.
1	"Corpse of the Year"	Leonard B. Stern	Don Mankiewicz	January 30, 1977
The recipient of a Man of the Year award is at a banquet in his honor when the lights suddenly black out and he's stabbed to death in the mêlée. There are no fewer than 200 suspects, the number of guests at the banquet, many of whom have motives. Rita Moreno, Milt Kamen and Brian Dennehy guest star.
2	"The Cadaver in the Clutter"	Joseph Pevney	Don Mankiewicz	March 20, 1977
Gunfire coming from the home of two elderly, eccentric brothers leads Lanigan to the dead body of the older brother, and the younger brother injured in a fall when he fired a revolver at the assailant while precariously balanced on a flight of stairs. The dead man was believed to have a huge fortune stashed somewhere in the house, which the younger brother denies. George Gobel, Steve Franken, Virginia Mayo and Anne Schedeen guest star.
3	"Say It Ain't So, Chief"	John Astin	Gordon Cotler; Don Mankiewicz	April 17, 1977
Things look bad for Lanigan when he is accused of accepting a bribe - but they're even worse when he's framed for murdering his accuser. Howard Duff, Beverly Garland and Jackie Coogan guest star.
4	"In Hot Weather, the Crime Rate Soars"	Joseph Pevney	Gordon Cotler; Don Mankiewicz	April 24, 1977
Lanigan faces more pressure than usual to solve a murder as the crime rate goes up and a rival politician pushes for the mayor's recall. Herb Edelman, Mel Ferrer, Constance Towers and Lawrence Pressman guest star.

== See Also ==
List of The NBC Mystery Movie episodes
