= Home by Spring =

- Screenplay by: Eric Brooks
- Story by: Dustin Rikert; William Shockley; Kix Brooks
- Directed by: Dwight H. Little
- Starring: Poppy Drayton; Steven R. McQueen
- Music by: Tommy Fields
- Country of origin: United States
- Original language: English

Production
- Producers: Kix Brooks; John Kuelbs; Tiiu Loigu; Tim Mudd; Dustin Rikert; William Shockley; Ryan Westheimer
- Cinematography: Rafael Leyva
- Editor: Bill Lynch
- Running time: 83 minutes
- Production companies: Hallmark Channel; Team 2 Entertainment

Original release
- Network: Hallmark Channel
- Release: March 31, 2018

Home by Spring is a 2018 romantic drama film directed by Dwight H. Little for the Hallmark Channel.

== Synopsis ==
A bookish event planner poses as her boss and returns to her hometown for a career opportunity. As she rekindles with family and an ex-boyfriend, she begins to question where she truly belongs.

== Cast ==
- Poppy Drayton as Loretta Johnson
- Steven R. McQueen as Wayne Hancock
- Mary-Margaret Humes as Susan Johnson
- Kix Brooks as Arthur Walters
- William Shockley as Burt
- Michael Welch as Howard
- Scott Bailey as Paul
- Vernee Watson as Mrs. Wilson
- Mia Matthews as Amy Bennett
- Christopher Mychael Watson as Turner
- Katrina Norman as Michelle
- Stephanie Honoré as Elizabeth Nash

== Production ==
Filming took place in Baton Rouge and St. Francisville, Louisiana as well as Los Angeles, California.

== Broadcast ==
The TV movie was broadcast on the Hallmark Channel at 9 p.m. on March 31, 2018.
