= Christopher Mitchum =

American actor and politician (born 1943)

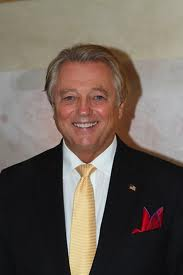
- Mitchum in 2012
- Born: October 16, 1943 (age 82); Los Angeles, California, U.S.
- Education: University of Pennsylvania; Trinity College, Dublin; University of Arizona (BA)
- Occupations: Actor; screenwriter; businessman
- Years active: 1966–present
- Political party: Republican
- Spouse: Cynthia "Cindy" Davis (m. 1964; div. 1996)
- Children: 4, including Bentley Mitchum and Carrie Mitchum
- Father: Robert Mitchum
- Relatives: Julie Mitchum (aunt); John Mitchum (uncle); James Mitchum (brother); Casper Van Dien (ex son-in-law); Grace Van Dien (granddaughter)

Christopher Mitchum (born October 16, 1943) is an American film actor, screenwriter, and businessman. He was born in Los Angeles, California, the second son of film star Robert Mitchum and Dorothy Mitchum. He is the younger brother of actor James Mitchum.

== Film career ==
Mitchum appeared in more than 60 films in 14 countries. He appeared with John Wayne in the motion pictures Chisum (1970), Rio Lobo (1970), and Big Jake (1971). He was cited by Box Office magazine as one of the top five stars of the future and the recipient of Photoplay's Gold Medal Award for 1972. He won both The Golden Horse Award (1981) and The Golden Reel, Best Actor award (1988, Indonesia).

=== Affiliations ===
He has been a member of the Academy of Motion Picture Arts and Sciences since 1978. He was the Screen Actors Guild national first vice president, in 1987–89 and a member of the SAG board of directors, in 1983–89.

== Personal life ==
Mitchum married Cynthia "Cindy" Davis in 1964. Together, they had children Bentley, Carrie, Jennifer, and Kian before divorcing in 1996. For four years in the 1990s, Mitchum was father-in-law to Carrie's husband, Casper Van Dien. Mitchum is the grandfather of Cappy Van Dien, Grace Van Dien, Allexanne Mitchum, Carrington Mitchum, and Wyatt Mitchum Cardone.

Mitchum has resided in the Santa Barbara, California area (Central Coast) since 1984.

=== Politics ===
A Republican, he ran for the California State Assembly in 1998, losing the general election to Democrat Hannah-Beth Jackson. In 2012 and 2014, he ran unsuccessfully for the U.S. House of Representatives in the 24th Congressional District; he lost the primary in 2012 to former lieutenant governor Abel Maldonado, and the general in 2014 to 16-year Democratic incumbent Lois Capps.

== Filmography ==
- 1969 Young Billy Young (uncredited)
- 1969 The Good Guys and the Bad Guys as Minor Role (uncredited)
- 1970 Chisum as Tom O'Folliard
- 1970 Bigfoot as Rick
- 1970 Suppose They Gave a War and Nobody Came as Alturi
- 1970 Rio Lobo as Sergeant Tuscarora Phillips
- 1971 Cactus in the Snow as George
- 1971 Big Jake as Michael McCandles
- 1972 Summertime Killer as Raymond Sullivan Castor
- 1973 A Time for Love (TV Movie) as Mark
- 1973 Murder in a Blue World as David
- 1973 Ricco the Mean Machine as Ricco Aversi
- 1974 Once as Creation
- 1974 Cosa Nostra Asia
- 1974 Master Samurai (a.k.a. "The Agency") as James Peterson
- 1974 Bloody Sun (a.k.a. "Blue Jeans & Dynamite")
- 1975 H-Bomb (a.k.a. "Great Friday"; Thai name ตัดเลี่ยมเพชร [Dtàt lìam pét]) as Eddie Fulmer / Reddy
- 1975 Chinese Commandos (Was Never Finished / Made)
- 1976 The Last Hard Men as Hal Brickman
- 1977 Flight to Holocaust (TV Movie) as Mark Gates
- 1978 Stingray as Al
- 1978 One Man Jury as Sergeant Blake
- 1979 The Day Time Ended as Richard Williams
- 1980 Tusk as Richard Cairn
- 1980 A Rumor of War (TV Mini-Series) as Captain Peterson
- 1980 Desperate Target (a.k.a. "Escape from Russia")
- 1981 The One Armed Executioner
- 1981 Ritoru Champion (a.k.a. "My Champion") as Mike Gorman
- 1983 Commander Firefox
- 1984 Magnum P.I. (TV Series) as Eric DeForrest
- 1984 The Executioner, Part II as Lieutenant Roger O'Malley
- 1984 No Time to Die (a.k.a. "Hijacked to Hell") as Mr. Gull
- 1985 Rocky IV as Russian Guard (uncredited)
- 1985 Promises to Keep (TV Movie) as Tom Palmer
- 1985 The Serpent Warriors as Dr. Tim Muffett
- 1986 American Commandos as Dean Mitchell
- 1986 Final Score as Richard Brown
- 1987 Angel of Death (a.k.a. "Commando Mengele") as Wolfgang Von Backey
- 1987 SFX Retaliator as Steve Baker
- 1987 Death Feud (a.k.a. "Savage Harbor") as Bill
- 1988 Columbian Connection (a.k.a. "Dark Mission: Flowers of Evil) as Derek Carpenter
- 1988 Faceless (a.k.a. "Les Predatuers de la Nuit") as Sam Morgan
- 1988 American Hunter (a.k.a. Lethal Hunter) as Jake Carver
- 1989-1991 We Are Seven (TV Series) as Tommy Morgan
- 1989 Gummibärchen küßt man nicht as Johannes Thalberg / Josef Thalberg
- 1990 Aftershock as Colonel Slater
- 1993 Magic Kid as Dad
- 1993 Tombstone as Ranch Hand
- 1993 Jungle of Fear
- 1995 Biohazard: The Alien Force as Donald Brady
- 1995 Body Count as Captain Langston
- 1995 Lethal Cowboy as Maffia Hoodlum
- 1995 Striking Point as Colonel Ivan Romanov
- 1995 Bad Boys as Sergeant Copperfield
- 1996 Fugitive X: Innocent Target (TV Movie) as Nick
- 1996 Countdown to Disaster (a.k.a. "Lethal Orbit", TV Movie) as Gunter
- 1996 Jimi as Chris Chandler
- 1997 Lethal Seduction as Trent Jacobson
- 1997 Motorcycle Cheerleading Mommas as Himself
- 1998 Diamondbacks as Bill Jones
- 1998 Love and War II: The Final Showdown
- 1999 Lycanthrope as Jake Sutter
- 1999 Night of Terror
- 2006 Soul Searchers as Sheriff Traft
- 2009 The Ritual as Sheriff Traft
- 2011 Goy (never finished) as Harald Rosenberg
- 2012 Santa's Summer House as Pop

== State and federal office candidacies ==
Mitchum has run once for the California State Assembly (35th District), and twice for the U.S. House of Representatives (California's 24th District). Since January 1, 2011, under California law, candidates are voter-nominated for state and federal offices; political parties cannot nominate candidates for office.

=== California Assembly ===
In 1998, Mitchum was the Republican nominee in the general election for the California State Assembly in the 35th district, which included portions of Santa Barbara and Ventura Counties, where he served on the Republican Central Committee (1998–2000). His opponents were Democrat Hannah-Beth Jackson and Natural Law Party candidate Eric Dahl. Mitchum came in second behind Jackson with 44.5 percent of the vote to Jackson's 53 percent.

=== U.S. Congress ===
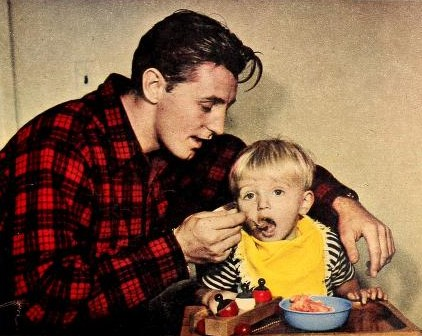
His father feeds Mitchum in 1946

In 2012, Mitchum ran for the U.S. House of Representatives as a Republican candidate in California's 24th district (San Luis Obispo, Santa Barbara, and part of Ventura counties), challenging incumbent Democratic Congresswoman Lois Capps. In the June 5, 2012 primary, he came in third, behind Republican Abel Maldonado and Capps, and ahead of Independent candidate Matt Boutté.

In 2014, Mitchum ran again for the U.S. congressional seat held by Representative Capps. He won the June 3, 2014, primary (running alongside four other Republicans, two additional Democrats, and an Independent candidate), coming in second behind Capps with 15.8 percent of the vote, and narrowly defeating Republican Justin Fareed by slightly over 600 votes. In the November 4 general election, Mitchum received 48.1 percent of the vote to Capps's 51.9 percent, in the closest race of Capps's entire congressional career.

Despite the close margin by which Mitchum lost to Capps, as well as the announcement that Capps would retire in 2016, Mitchum ultimately declined a third run for the same seat again, and instead endorsed Assemblyman Katcho Achadjian for the race to succeed Capps.

== Election statistics ==
California State Assembly, 35th District: 1998
Party	Candidate	Votes	%
Democratic	Hannah-Beth Jackson	67,224	53.03
Republican	Chris Mitchum	56,382	44.48
Natural Law	Eric Dahl	3,151	2.49
Invalid or blank votes		7,602	5.66
Total votes		135,359	100.00

U.S. House of Representatives, California, 24th District: 2012
Primary election
Party	Candidate	Votes	%
Democratic	Lois Capps (incumbent)	72,356	46.4
Republican	Abel Maldonado	46,295	29.7
Republican	Chris Mitchum	33,604	21.5
No party preference	Matt Boutté	3,832	2.5
Total votes		156,087	100.0
General election
Democratic	Lois Capps (incumbent)	156,749	55.1
Republican	Abel Maldonado	127,746	44.9
Total votes		284,495	100.0

U.S. House of Representatives, California, 24th District: 2014
Primary election
Party	Candidate	Votes	%
Democratic	Lois Capps (incumbent)	58,198	43.7
Republican	Chris Mitchum	21,059	15.8
Republican	Justin Donald Fareed	20,445	15.3
Republican	Dale Francisco	15,575	11.7
Republican	Bradley Allen	9,268	7.0
Democratic	Sandra Marshall	4,646	3.5
Democratic	Paul H. Coyne, Jr.	2,144	1.6
No party preference	Steve Isakson	1,249	0.9
Republican	Alexis Stuart	678	0.5
Total votes		133,263	100.0
General election
Democratic	Lois Capps (incumbent)	103,228	51.9
Republican	Chris Mitchum	95,566	48.1
Total votes		198,794	100.0

== Philanthropic positions ==
Mitchum has served on several organizations'boards of directors and has been a fundraiser for a number of charities.

- Hollywood Benefit Horse Show, advisory board, 1996–present
- ZONA SECA, Board of Director, 2011–present
- Community Outreach for Prevention and Education chairman and honorary chairman, 1998–present
- Liberty Program—gang-member rehabilitation program—board member, Santa Barbara, 1999–2001
- Criminal Advisory Board for Fighting Back, Santa Barbara, 1999–2004
- Public Policy Advisory Board for Fighting Back, Santa Barbara, 1999–2004
- Board of directors, Police Activities League, Santa Barbara, 1999–2001
- Juvenile Justice & Delinquency Prevention Commission, chairman, for the governor's Office, State of California, OCJP January 1999
- Autistic Treatment Center "Roundup of Autism": Honorary Advisory Council: 1994–2002
- North American Riding for the Handicapped Association Advisory Board: 1992–96
- Santa Barbara International Film Festival: Honorary Board 1988–92
- Santa Barbara International Film Festival, board of directors: one-year term, 1987
- Santa Barbara Civic Light Opera: founding chairman of the "Star Circle" fund-raiser, 1989
