= A Killer in the Family =

1983 television film directed by Richard T. Heffron

- DVD cover
- Genre: Crime; Drama; Thriller
- Written by: Robert Aller; Sue Grafton; Steve Humphrey
- Directed by: Richard T. Heffron
- Starring: Robert Mitchum; James Spader; Lance Kerwin; Eric Stoltz
- Theme music composer: Gerald Fried
- Country of origin: United States
- Original language: English

Production
- Executive producer: Stan Margulies
- Producers: Robert Aller; Gloria Aller
- Cinematography: Hanania Baer
- Editor: Michael Eliot
- Running time: 90 minutes
- Production companies: Stan Margulies Productions; Sunn Classic Pictures

Original release
- Network: ABC
- Release: October 30, 1983

A Killer in the Family is a 1983 American made-for-television crime film directed by Richard T. Heffron. The film is based on the Tison v. Arizona case, which took place in Arizona in 1978. Warner Home Video released the movie on DVD in 2010 after it first aired on ABC on October 30, 1983.

== Plot ==
Gary Tison is serving two consecutive life sentences for murder, while his three young adolescent sons try to move on with their lives. The oldest, Donny, is the only son making something of his life. He is a pre-law student and is in a loving relationship with his high school sweetheart, Carol. His younger brothers Ray, a farm laborer, and Ricky, who spend their days doing nothing, make the decision to free their father from prison after becoming convinced that a fellow prisoner is going to kill him. Donny, morally challenged, threatens to give them up to the police. Noticing their determination, he agrees to go along, convinced that they can never break Gary out without his help. The three young men drive up to the prison and Donny and Ricky use their guns to keep everyone hostage, while Ray breaks out Gary and his cellmate Randy Greenawalt.

Once outside, the gang grabs the car and drives off in the Arizona landscape. An immediate police announcement is made, warning the citizens that the men are armed and dangerous. Donny laughs off the situation, not believing that any of the fugitives could do anyone harm. However, things change when one night Gary decides to change cars to evade the cops. He hijacks a car and forces the people inside to step out. The driver John Lyons, his wife Dannelda, their young niece Teresa, and their baby are terrified of Gary, even though Donny tries to calm them down by promising they will not harm them. Despite John's promise to Gary that he will not call the cops, Gary fears that the man will betray him and decides to kill him and his family. Realizing that his sons will not allow him, he sends them away to get water for the couple and then shoots all four of them. The sons are shocked and appalled and realize their father may not be as innocent and loving as they thought.

The next morning, while in a gas station shop, Ray tells Donny that they could go to the police since they were not involved with the murders. Donny, however, silences him and explains that Gary will never let them go away. They go back to their father and go into hiding with a female friend of Randy. The gas station shop owner, meanwhile, has recognized the gang from the paper and warns the police. They have already fled, though, when they arrive to arrest them and leave the spot with a newly-bought car, heading out to Mexico.

In the end, the police ambush them. Donny is shot to death, and his brothers are arrested and sent to death row. Gary was able to flee the crime, but his body is found eleven days later.

== Cast ==
- Robert Mitchum as Gary Tison
- James Spader as Donald "Donny" Tison
- Lance Kerwin as Ray Tison
- Eric Stoltz as Ricky Tison
- Salome Jens as Alice Johansen
- Lynn Carlin as Dorothy Tison
- Stuart Margolin as Randy Greenawalt
- Arliss Howard as John Lyons
- Amanda Wyss as Dannelda Lyons
- Susan Swift as Teresa
- Catherine Mary Stewart as Carol
- Liam Duque as Alfan

== Production ==
Parts of the film were shot in St. George, Utah.

== See also ==
- Last Rampage, a 2017 film about Gary Tison
