= Edward H. Feldman =

American director and producer

- Born: Edward Henry Feldman; November 25, 1920; New York, U.S.
- Died: November 30, 1988 (aged 68); Santa Monica, California, U.S.
- Occupation(s): Television director, producer
- Spouse: Mary Feldman

Edward Henry Feldman (November 25, 1920 – November 30, 1988) was an American television director and producer. He was nominated for three Primetime Emmy Awards in the category Outstanding Comedy Series for his work on the television series Hogan's Heroes.

Feldman died on November 30, 1988, of heart disease in Santa Monica, California, at the age of 68.

== In popular culture ==
Feldman was portrayed by actor Bruce Solomon in the 2002 biographical drama film Auto Focus.
