= Forgive Me Father =

2022 video game

- Developer: Byte Barrel
- Publishers: 1C Entertainment; Fulqrum Publishing
- Composer: Tim Fialka
- Engine: Unreal Engine 4
- Platforms: Microsoft Windows; Nintendo Switch; PlayStation 4; Xbox One
- Release: Microsoft Windows; April 7, 2022; Switch, PS4, Xbox One; September 28, 2023
- Genre: First person shooter
- Mode: Single-player

Forgive Me Father is a 2022 first person shooter developed by Polish developer Byte Barrel for Microsoft Windows, Nintendo Switch, PlayStation 4 and Xbox One. As either a priest or journalist, the player fights off plague-ridden zombies and cultists in the strange town of Pestisville. The game was successful, and led to development of a sequel which launched in early access in 2023.

== Gameplay ==
The game leans strongly on the mechanics of early shooters such as Doom. Much of the environment consists of tight corridor environments. The player must seek out keys to unlock new areas. A skill tree mechanic allows the player to upgrade weapons, as well as passive and active abilities.

The player has a variety of weapons in their arsenal including conventional guns as well as supernatural items such as "a throwing knife infused with dark demonic tendrils". A madness mechanic is linked to certain special abilities, and rewards faster "run n gun" players. Madness is accrued by killing or drinking alcohol and can be spent on certain abilities, but madness also adds distracting visual effects which introduces a risk/reward consideration. The difficulty is at times quite high, as the player can become overwhelmed by the sheer number of enemies which are fairly damaging when they manage to land a hit.

Enemies have unique traits. For example, a zombie carrying a severed head can recover from a headshot by placing the severed head atop their own neck. Some enemies can also continue to crawl and represent a risk even after being heavily injured. There is also an enemy type which mimics an explosive barrel that can charge the player.

== Story ==
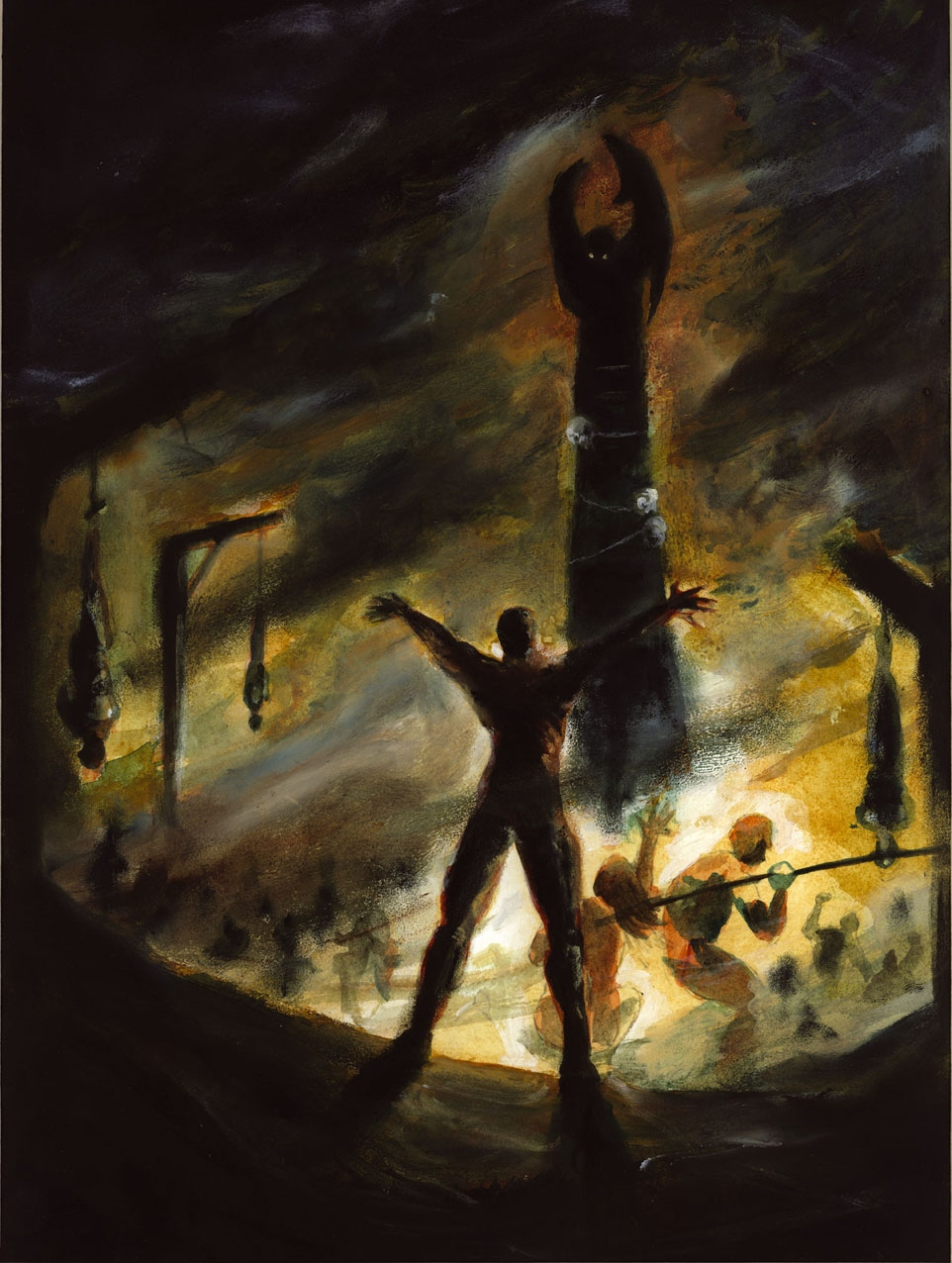
Forgive Me Father draws on imagery and themes from the Cthulhu Mythos.

The game takes place in and around Pestisville, a New England port town. The town has become overrun by a plague that has turned many locals into zombies, and a local cult is an additional danger. The narrative is largely conveyed through documents and photographs, which are scattered throughout the game with a "story" label above. These are optional to read. Playing as either the journalist or the priest, the player awakens in a house in town and travels through the neighbourhood taking on the zombies and cultists, culminating in a descent to the abyss and a battle against Cthulhu. After slaying Cthulhu, the player awakens in a mental hospital. They learn that they slaughtered the town while hallucinating.

== Development ==
Forgive Me Father was developed by the indie team Byte Barrel, which had a staff of nine people on the project. Byte Barrel was a fairly new studio, having been founded in 2017 with a MythBusters game being their first project. The group were inspired by retro shooters such as Doom and Marathon as well as newer games like Void Bastards, Bioshock, Dusk and Project Warlock.

The game makes use of a "2D/3D comic book style" composed of hand illustrated foes who move about in a 3D environment. The decision to use the 2D/3D approach came early, and the comic book visual style was then a natural choice for the format.

The game was released into early access on October 28, 2021, with a three level demo. An exclusive trailer was released by IGN in April 2022, ahead of the game's full release.

== Reception ==
=== Early Access version ===
The early access version was positively received by PC Gamer, which praised the visual style and animations. The publication favorably compared the art style to XIII. PC Gamer reviewed it again several months later and was critical on the story and the presence of many cameos and references to other intellectual properties, which they felt detracted from the Lovecraftian theme. However they were overall optimistic about the direction of the game and how it would be at launch. CBR was also positive during early access, particularly highlighting the madness mechanics. Kotaku noted that the difficulty decreased over the course of the Early Access version, as the player would become increasingly robust with perks and abilities.

=== Launch ===
Reception

Aggregate score
Aggregator	Score
OpenCritic	62% recommend

Destructoid reviewed the game at launch and gave it an "Alright" rating. Destructoid were positive about the gameplay, though found that the story pickups were at times distracting, lamented the lack of a quick melee kill, and found it repetitive in the long run. They gave a hedged recommendation, stating that "if you’re a diehard FPS fan, you should totally give it a try, but if not, this might be one to skip." Bloody Disgusting's review was likewise mixed, noting the visuals and the feel of the gunplay worked well while criticising voice work and imbalanced level design towards the second half.
