= Jason James Richter =

American actor (born 1980)

- Born: January 29, 1980 (age 46); Medford, Oregon
- Occupation: Actor
- Years active: 1992–present
- Notable work: Free Willy (1993); Free Willy 2: The Adventure Home (1995); Free Willy 3: The Rescue (1997)

Jason James Richter (born January 29, 1980) is an American actor, musician, producer, and director.

Originally from Medford, Oregon, Richter rose to fame as a child actor, starring in the Free Willy franchise. His career includes a wide range of roles in film and television, as well as work behind the camera. He has appeared in notable productions such as The Little Things (2021), Last Call (2021), and The NeverEnding Story III (1994). His television credits include guest roles on popular series like Bones, Sabrina, the Teenage Witch, and Criminal Minds: Suspect Behavior.

In recent years, Richter has expanded his career into producing and directing. He has produced several films, including Natty Knocks (2023) and The Last Rampage (2017). His directorial debut came with the short film The Quiet Loud in 2013, which he also wrote and produced. Throughout his career, Richter has received recognition for his performances, including a Young Artist Award for his role in Free Willy and nominations for MTV Movie Awards.

As of 2025, Richter continues to be active in the industry, with his most recent acting credit in Final Heist (2024).

== Early life ==
Richter was born on January 29, 1980.

== Career ==
Richter starred as Jesse in Free Willy (1993), a role for which he was chosen out of more than 4,000 candidates.

His other films include Cops & Robbersons, The NeverEnding Story III, Free Willy 2: The Adventure Home, Laserhawk, Free Willy 3: The Rescue, and The Setting Son. He also reprised his role as Jesse in the music video for Michael Jackson's "Childhood", which was featured in Free Willy 2: The Adventure Home. In 2021, he appeared in the thriller The Little Things, his first studio film since the Free Willy films. Between the Free Willy roles, he had TV guest roles on Sabrina, the Teenage Witch, Rugrats and The Client.

Following his appearance in Ricochet River, Richter took a decade long hiatus from acting where he was the bassist Fermata.

== Filmography ==
Film
Year	Title	Role	Notes
1993	Free Willy	Jesse Greenwood	
1994	Cops & Robbersons	Kevin Robberson	
1994	The NeverEnding Story III: Return to Fantasia	Bastian	
1995	Free Willy 2: The Adventure Home	Jesse Greenwood	
1997	Free Willy 3: The Rescue	Jesse Greenwood	
1997	The Setting Son	Big Bully	
1997	Laserhawk	Zach Raymond	
2001	Ricochet River	Wade	
2009	Tekken	Bonner's Associate	Also assistant director
2013	The Quiet Loud	Paul	Short film; also director, writer & producer
2014	Life's a Pitch	Jimmy	TV film
2016	Vicious	Jeff	Also producer
2017	Last Rampage	Brawley	Also associate producer
2017	3 Solitude	Elliot	
2017	High & Outside: A Baseball Noir	Johnny	
2018	Inhumane	Dr. Aaron Graybor	
2018	Remember the Sultana	Corporal Erastus Winters/ Corporal William Norton/ Private John Zazier (voice)	
2018	818	Alex	
2018	Driver	Alexander Hutchins	
2019	The Brawler	John Olson	
2019	Infidelity	Garret Walker	
2021	The Little Things	Detective Williams	
2021	Last Call	Saville	
2023	Natty Knocks	Leo	
2023	Nothing to See Here	Daniel	
2024	Final Heist	TBA	

Television
Year	Title	Role	Notes
1995	Movie Magic	Himself	Episode: "Aqua Animatronics"
1996	The Client	Chris Love	Episode: "The Morning After"
1997	Sabrina the Teenage Witch	Dante	Episode: "Dante's Inferno"
1997	Rugrats	Ringo the Bull	Episode: "He Saw, She Saw/Piggy's Pizza Palace"
2001	Mega Movie Magic	Himself (archive footage)	Episode: "Free Willy 2/Independence Day"
2009	Bones	Clown No. 2	Episode: "Double Trouble in the Panhandle"
2011	Criminal Minds: Suspect Behavior	Matthew Keane	Episode: "Nighthawk"

Music videos
Year	Title	Role	Artist	Director
1995	"Childhood"	Jesse	Michael Jackson	Nicholas Brandt
2018	"Pink Honey"	Tall Man	Houses	Brook Linder

== Awards and nominations ==
Award	Year	Category	Nominated work	Result	Ref.
Young Artist Awards	1994	Best Youth Actor Leading Role in a Motion Picture: Drama	Free Willy (shared with Edward Furlong for A Home of Our Own)	Won	
MTV Movie & TV Awards	1994	Breakthrough Performance	Free Willy	Nominated	
MTV Movie & TV Awards	1994	Best Kiss	Free Willy (shared with Keiko)	Nominated	
