= Randy Greenawalt =

American serial killer (1949–1997)

- Greenawalt in 1997
- Born: Randall Greenawalt; February 24, 1949; Hannibal, Missouri, U.S.
- Died: January 23, 1997 (aged 47); Florence State Prison, Florence, Arizona, U.S.
- Cause of death: Execution by lethal injection
- Other name: Randall Scott Braaten
- Convictions: Murder x5 Assault with a deadly weapon x17 Escape; Possession of deadly weapon by prisoner Theft of vehicle x2 Flight from law enforcement Robbery x2 Kidnapping x3
- Penalty: 25-years-to-life (First murders); Death (Second murders)

Details
- Victims: 7–9
- Span of crimes: 1974–1978
- Country: United States
- States: Arkansas, Arizona, Colorado
- Date apprehended: For the last time on August 11, 1978

Randall Greenawalt (February 24, 1949 – January 23, 1997) was an American serial killer and mass murderer. Originally sentenced to life imprisonment for two murders committed in 1974, Greenawalt later became notorious for escaping together with fellow murderer Gary Tison and his three sons from prison, embarking on a two-week killing spree through Arizona and Colorado that left six people dead in 1978. He was promptly sentenced to death and thereafter executed in 1997, with his case serving as the basis for the Supreme Court decision Tison v. Arizona.

== First murders and imprisonment ==
In early January 1974, Greenawalt went on a trip down to Miami, Florida, where he planned to exchange his car with a couple from Denver, Colorado. On January 12, the body of 42-year-old Henry A. Weber, a Global Van Lines truck driver who had been shot in the head, was found at a highway rest area in Mississippi County, Arkansas. Initially, nobody could be connected to the crime until four days later, when police officers in Tempe, Arizona detained brothers Randy and James Greenawalt, 25 and 23, respectively, for the January 15 murder of 36-year-old Stanley Edward Sandage at a rest area near Flagstaff. Like Weber, Sandage was a truck driver working for Whitfield Tank Lines who was found shot to death in his tank truck in an apparent robbery, as $42 had been stolen from his wallet.

The Greenawalts were arrested for trying to purchase stereo equipment using Sandage's MasterCharge card, and upon inspecting their vehicle, they found a .32-caliber pistol that was positively identified as the murder weapon, and a .243-caliber rifle that might have been the second murder weapon. A third man, 33-year-old George Sanders, an apparent acquaintance of the brothers, was also arrested for federal firearms violations and credit card fraud in relation to the case. Due to the similarity of the two cases, a sheriff from Arkansas was dispatched to question Randy in the earlier killing, but decided to wait until the case in Arizona went first. In a bid to avoid the death penalty, the elder Greenawalt pleaded guilty to the murder and was sentenced to life imprisonment, in exchange for testifying against his brother, who had pleaded innocent on all charges. During the trial, it was made apparent that in the Sandage murder, Randy had pre-emptively painted an "X" on the window of the truck before proceeding to open fire and kill his victim. Thanks to his testimony, James was also convicted and sentenced to life imprisonment, which he was to spend at the Florence State Prison. In the meantime, Randy was extradited to face charges in Arkansas, but despite his willing confession to both this and another murder committed in Colorado, the case fell through and he was returned to serve his sentence in Arizona.

== Escape and killing spree ==
During his time in prison, Greenawalt was considered a model inmate and granted a cushy job as an office clerk. Another inmate placed in the trustee unit with him was 43-year-old Gary Gene Tison, who was serving a life term for killing a prison guard, 65-year-old James Stiner, and had a history of escape attempts from the facility. On July 30, 1978, Tison's three sons (Donald, Ricky, and Raymond), who regularly visited their father in prison, entered the prison, ostensibly for another one of their visits. While Ricky was talking to his father, his brothers pulled out a sawn-off shotgun concealed in a cardboard box they had been carrying and ordered the guards to go into the booth. Greenawalt, who had been working in the booth, then cut the alarm and phone lines, and was provided with a pistol. After locking the remaining guards, visitors, and prisoners into a supply closet, all five men escaped in the Tisons' 1969 Ford Galaxie, with their planned final destination being a small ranch across the border in Sáric, Mexico, where Gary allegedly had connections with a drug smuggling network.

On the way towards Yuma, the gang changed their car with a black Lincoln Continental and drove on dirt roads to avoid roadblocks. The next day, the gang was near Quartzsite when their car blew a tire and they were left stranded by the roadside. The Tisons and Greenawalt then established a campsite in the area, where they were noticed by 24-year-old Marine Sgt. John Lyons, who was driving along the highway with his 23-year-old wife Donnelda, 22-month-old son Christopher, and 15-year-old niece Teresa-Jo Tyson. Lyons stopped and offered to help them out, but he and his family members were then forced at gunpoint into the Continental and driven out in the desert. There, both Gary and Greenawalt proceeded to shoot the Lyonses to death, while Tyson was left to bleed out, dying while attempting to crawl away from the car. The Lyonses' corpses were discovered on August 6, while Tyson's was found five days later.

In the meantime, the gang had stolen the family's orange Mazda and headed to Wenden, where they spray-painted it a silver color. After this, they headed towards Flagstaff, where they established a new campsite on the outskirts of town. While the other three rested, Greenawalt and Donald went to visit a female pen pal of Greenawalt's, who bought them a truck and ammunition. Shortly after, Gary arranged for a plane to fly them out of the United States from Clovis, New Mexico, but authorities had caught wind of their scheme and set up an ambush. Upon arriving at the airport however, the gang realized and instead headed towards southwestern Colorado. Along their way, they came across Texas newlyweds James Jr. and Margene Judge, 26 and 24, respectively, who were on their way to Denver to watch a football game. The gang killed them near Pagosa Springs on August 9, stole their van, and then buried their bodies, which were not found until months after their disappearance.

== Arrest, trial and sentence ==
After stealing the Judges' van, the gang headed to Casa Grande, Arizona, where they stayed with a relative of Gary's. After resting for a day, they continued their trip towards Mexico, unaware that by then, the police had set up roadblocks along every intersection of the roads. Along the way, the gang attempted to break into a gas station near Gila Bend, but were unsuccessful in doing so. On August 11, the van approached their first roadblock in rural Pinal County. The gang opened fire on the approaching officer, barely missing him, before they drove right through the blockade.

About six miles ahead, they faced another roadblock, but this time, the deputies opened fire on the van. 20-year-old Donald Tison, who was driving, was fatally hit in the head, causing the vehicle to careen off the road. After it halted, the remaining four fled towards the desert, with the deputies chasing after them. A helicopter was dispatched to illuminate the area, revealing that Greenawalt and the two living Tison brothers had been hiding in a ditch. While all three were armed, they surrendered peacefully to the authorities. Gary Tison remained on the run for 11 days, until his body was discovered by chemical worker Ray Thomas under a mesquite tree near his workplace. He had died of exposure, about a mile and a half from where the van had crashed.

Following their capture, Greenawalt and the Tison brothers were first arraigned on charges of prison escape and assault, for which they were speedily convicted in December 1978. Soon after, Greenawalt was charged with four counts of capital murder, three counts of kidnapping, two counts of armed robbery and one count of auto theft, while Ricky and Raymond, who claimed that they took no part in the killings, pleaded guilty to one count of murder as part of a plea bargain to testify against their accomplice. However, once they refused to do so, the judge declared a mistrial and reversed the verdict, allowing the brothers to be charged anew. On February 16, 1979, Greenawalt was convicted on all charges, showing no emotion when his verdict was read out. On March 26, he was officially sentenced to death for the four murders, as well as being given concurrent life terms for his other convictions. Justice Douglas Keddie later stated that he had no reason to be lenient with the convict, as he found no mitigating circumstances in the case and determined the killings to be cruel and unnecessary. The murder charges in Colorado were dropped following the Arizona convictions, and the case was officially closed.

== Execution ==
After spending two decades on Arizona's death row with unsuccessful attempts to have his sentence commuted, Greenawalt was executed via lethal injection at the Florence State Prison on January 23, 1997. His last meal consisted of two cheeseburgers, French fries, coffee, and milk from the prison cafeteria, and his final statement was the following: "I have prayed for you many times and the Lord is using you well. Don't worry about me. I'll be fine."

Ricky and Raymond Tison, who had also been sentenced to death for their roles in the murders, later had their sentences commuted to life imprisonment after the Arizona Supreme Court determined that they were not active participants in the shootings.

== See also ==
General:

- Capital punishment in Arizona
- Capital punishment in the United States
- List of people executed by lethal injection
- List of people executed in Arizona
- List of people executed in the United States in 1997
- List of serial killers in the United States

Supreme Court case:

- Tison v. Arizona

== In media and culture ==
- The events around the Tison Gang have been dramatized in two separate films: the 1983 made-for-television film A Killer in the Family, and 2017's Last Rampage.

== Bibliography ==
- James T. Clarke (September 1, 1999). Last Rampage: The Escape of Gary Tison. University of Arizona Press. ISBN 0816519676.
- Steven Carter and Franca Gerli (2004). The Nothing that is and the Nothing that is Not: On Death, Dying and Suffering. University Press of America. ISBN 0761830022.
- Evan J. Mandery (2005). Capital Punishment: A Balanced Examination. Jones & Bartlett Publishing. ISBN 0763733083.
- Louis J. Palmer, Jr. (May 7, 2014). Organ Transplants from Executed Prisoners: An Argument for Death Sentence Organ Removal Statutes. McFarland. ISBN 978-0786479900.
