= Mike Stone (karate) =

American martial artist

- Born: June 29, 1943 (age 83); Makawao, Maui, Territory of Hawaii US
- Height: 5 ft 11 in (1.80 m)
- Weight: 175 lb (79 kg; 12.5 st)
- Style: Shorin-ryu Karate
- Teacher: Herbert Peters
- Rank: 10th degree black belt

Mike Stone (born June 29, 1943) is an American martial artist, karate fighter, fight choreographer, stuntman, actor, author, and motivational speaker.

== Biography ==
Mike Stone was born in Makawao, Maui, Hawaii. Stone's first introduction to the martial arts was in Aikido while as a student Lahainaluna High School. After graduating Stone enlisted in the US Army in 1962. Stone began studying Shorin-ryu Karate earning his black belt in only six months under Herbert Peters while stationed at Fort Chaffee in Arkansas. Well known for his karate tournament success in the 1960s, Stone, known for his aggressiveness, was called "The Animal". He had 91 consecutive wins. In 1964, Stone won the sparring grand championship at the first International Karate Championships in Long Beach, California. Stone has written several books, including Mike Stone's Book of American Eclectic Karate.

== Karate career ==
In 1963, Stone won the Southwest Karate Championship in the black belt division. The promoter was Allen Steen, who held victories over Stone and Chuck Norris. At Ed Parker's 1964 Internationals Karate Championship, Stone defeated Harry Keolanui in the finals to become Grand Champion. In Chicago that same year, Stone scored victories over Ray Cooper and Mills Crenshaw to win the First World Karate Tournament. At the U.S. National Karate Championships in 1965, Stone won the championship by beating Walter Worthy. Also that year, Stone again won Ed Parker's International Karate Championship by defeating Art Pelela and Tony Tulleners. Three years later, Stone won the World Professional Karate Championship on November 24, 1968 by beating Bob Taiani by points decision. In 1969 at the U.S. National Karate Championship, Stone lost an upset decision to Victor Moore.

== Personal life ==
Stone met Elvis and Priscilla Presley in 1968 at the Mainland vs. Hawaii Karate Championships promoted by Elvis' longtime karate instructor Ed Parker. Stone had a young child and a pregnant wife. Stone had been working as a bodyguard for record producer Phil Spector. After the show, Elvis invited Stone back to the couple's penthouse suite where Elvis suggested that Priscilla train with Stone (according to Ed Parker, to Chuck Norris and to Mike Stone, Elvis never asked Stone to be his wife's karate instructor). Three weeks later Priscilla made the 45-minute drive to Stone's school in Huntington Beach. Because of the distance Priscilla opted to train with Chuck Norris who had a school in West Los Angeles, which was closer to the Presley home. Stone would make occasional trips to Norris's school to train Priscilla. The relationship soon turned romantic, contributing to Elvis and Priscilla's split in February 1972 and divorce in 1973. Stone and Priscilla would eventually split up because he sold a story to the Globe tabloid entitled "How I Stole Elvis Presley's Wife From Him". Priscilla said she split with Stone then, "because he went to the press".

Stone has been married three times. He met his first wife, Mary Ann Dobbs, while in the army stationed at Fort Chaffee. He met his second wife, Francine Doxey in Newport Beach where he was working as a bouncer. In 1985, Stone sold all his possessions and moved to an isolated island in the Philippines, where he and his third wife Taina live.
