= Bruce Solomon =

American actor (born 1943)

- Solomon as Rabbi David Small in Lanigan's Rabbi, 1977
- Born: August 12, 1943 (age 83)
- Occupation: Actor
- Years active: 1972–2002

Bruce Peter Solomon (born 12 August 1943), is an American film and television actor, best known for the roles of Sgt. Foley in the TV show Mary Hartman, Mary Hartman and Kenny Zuckerman in Beverly Hills, 90210.

== Career ==
=== Television and film ===
Solomon starred as the title character in the short-lived 1977 television series Lanigan's Rabbi, but is best known for his portrayal of Sgt. Foley on the TV show, Mary Hartman, Mary Hartman. His acting teacher, Joan Darling, one of the directors for Mary Hartman, Mary Hartman, chose him for that role, despite the fact that it was originally written as an older, middle-aged policeman. When Solomon was cast in the role it was rewritten as a young, handsome, "ever-on-the-make" police officer. He was also known for the role of Kenny Zuckerman in Beverly Hills, 90210.

In addition to his role of Rabbi David Small in Lanigan's Rabbi, he would also play a rabbi in the 2000 film, Harrison's Flowers.

Solomon was part of the cast of the comedy series E/R, which included Elliott Gould, Jason Alexander, and Mary McDonnell. His many guest star appearances in other series included Barney Miller and Resurrection Boulevard, and films including The Candidate and Foul Play. One of his earliest movies was Children Shouldn't Play with Dead Things, in 1972. He was also in the 1986 TV movie, Maricela, about the daughter of an affluent American family who resents the daughter of the live-in maid from El Salvador. The TV drama was produced for public television's WonderWorks series.

In one of his most recent movie appearances, Solomon plays Edward H. Feldman, the Executive Producer of the television series Hogan's Heroes, in the 2002 film Auto Focus, the story of actor Bob Crane. In that film, he has the well-known line to Crane, "Bob, don't try so hard. You're the hero of the show. It's named after you. Heroes don't try to be heroes. They simply are." Another of his famous lines—from the film Foul Play with Goldie Hawn—was "The dwarf...beware the dwarf."

=== Stage ===
In addition to his roles in film and television, Solomon has appeared on stage in a number of plays in the Los Angeles area, including a number of productions of the Elephant Theatre Company. Among the productions in which he has appeared were Search and Destroy, Dearboy's War, and Greystone. And, after playing a rabbi on television and film, he originated the role of Catholic priest Fr. Carney in the Hollywood Stella Adler Theatre world premiere of the play Friends of Frank, the story of the decision to cast Marlon Brando in On The Waterfront rather than Frank Sinatra. The play was produced in 2005.

== Personal life ==
Solomon married Stephanie Glass in December 1967. They divorced in December 1976.

Solomon married Pamela Kath, Chicago singer Terry Kath's first wife, on September 8, 1981. They have one child together.

== Filmography ==
=== Films ===
Year	Title	Role	Notes
1972	Children Shouldn't Play with Dead Things	Winns	
1978	Foul Play	Bob "Scotty" Scott	
1986	Night of the Creeps	Sgt. Raimi	
2001	Hunger	Mr. Christie	
2002	Auto Focus	Edward H. Feldman	

=== Television ===
Year	Title	Role	Notes
1973	The Streets of San Francisco	Doctor	Episode - "Winterkill"
1975	Harry O	Official	Episode - "Tender Killing Care"
1975	Barney Miller	Flag Salesman	Episode - "Horse Thief"
1976–77	Mary Hartman, Mary Hartman	Sgt. Dennis Foley	Main cast (104 episodes)
1977	Lanigan's Rabbi	Rabbi David Small	Main cast (4 episodes)
1978	The Love Boat	Bill Edwards	Episode - "Too Hot to Handle/Family Reunion/Cinderella Story"
1979	One Day at a Time	Dr. Grayson	Episode - "Between Mother and Daughter"
1979	Eight Is Enough	Andre	Episode - "Arrivals"
1983	The Fall Guy	Charlie Bester	Episode - "P.S. I Love You"
1984	The Facts of Life	Bill Simpson	Episode - "The Summer of '84"
1984–85	E/R	Michael Alexander	Recurring role (5 episodes)
1985	The A-Team	Jorge	Episode - "Uncle Buckle-Up"
1986	Fame	Dr. Lindstrom	Episode - "Choices"
1986	The Twilight Zone	Mr. Michaels	Episode - "Monsters!"
1986	Simon & Simon	Mitch Lewis	Episode - "For the People"
1986	Maricela	Sam Gannett	TV movie
1986	St. Elsewhere	Ehrlich's Patient	Episode - "Where There's Hope, There's Crosby"
1987	A Year in the Life	Ben	Episode - "Don't I Know You from Somewhere?"
1991	Knots Landing	Tony Gerald	Episodes - "1001 Nights of Anne Matheson", "Lost at Sea"
1994	Beverly Hills, 90210	Kenny Zuckerman	Episode - "Scared Very Straight"
