= Julio Oscar Mechoso =

Cuban actor (1955–2017)

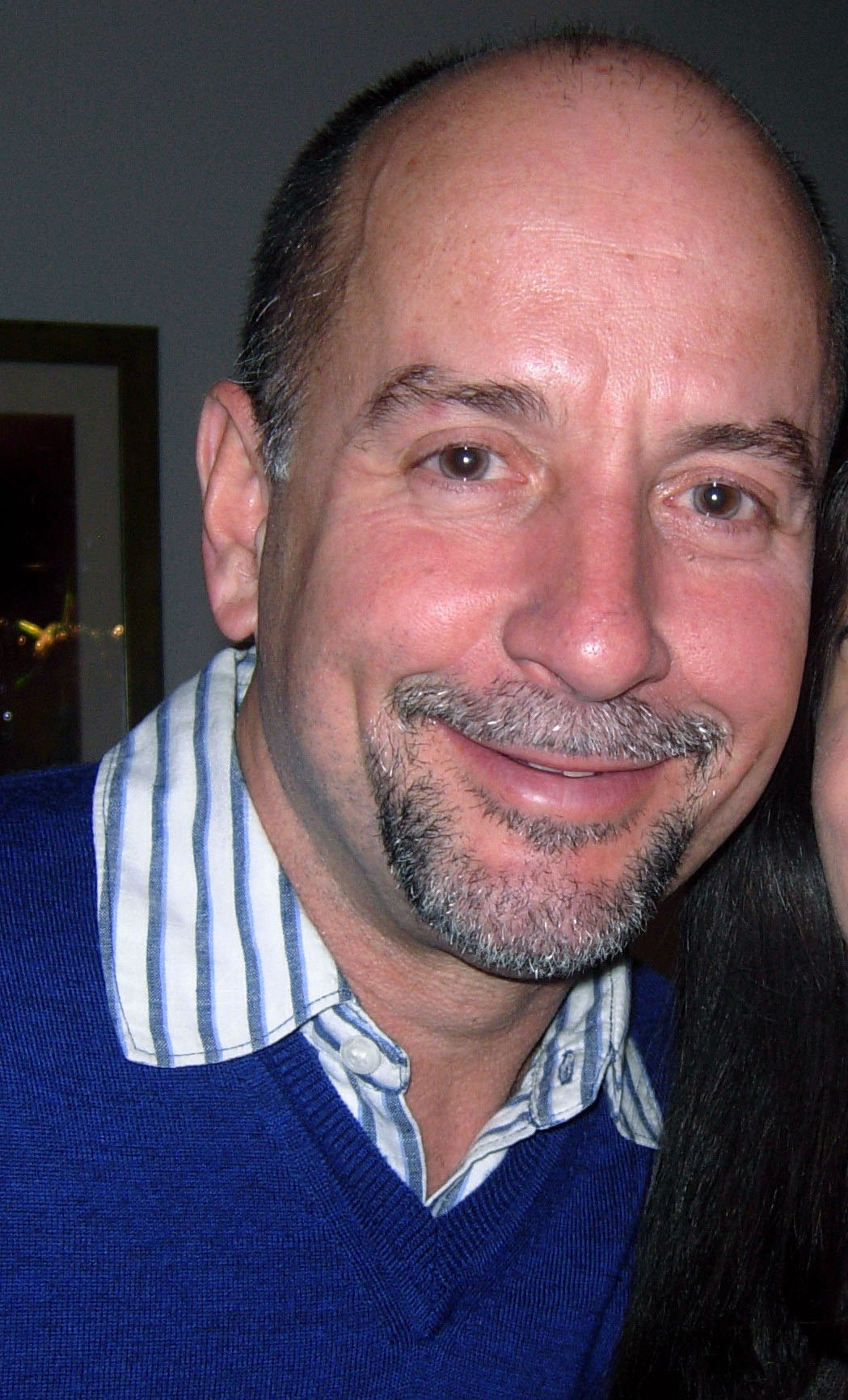
- Mechoso in 2009
- Born: May 31, 1955; Matanzas, Cuba
- Died: November 25, 2017 (aged 62); Burbank, California, U.S.
- Occupation: Actor
- Years active: 1979–2017

Julio Óscar Mechoso (May 31, 1955 – November 25, 2017) was a Cuban-American actor who played detective Ruiz in Bad Boys and appeared in such films as Blue Streak, Jurassic Park III, The Legend of Zorro, The Lost City, Little Miss Sunshine and Rules Don't Apply. He had over 120 well known films and TV roles.

== Biography ==
=== Career ===
Mechoso was a character actor in both television and film. He appeared in dozens of films, such as Grindhouse, Bad Boys, where he played Detective Ruiz, Blue Streak, Heartbreakers, Jurassic Park III, the controversial Ken Park, The Lost City, The Legend of Zorro, Little Miss Sunshine, Transpecos and Rules Don't Apply. His television credits include Miami Vice, Coach, Damon, Seinfeld, Grey's Anatomy, Cane, The Big Bang Theory, Miami Medical, Matador, where he played Javi Sandoval, and Greetings from Tucson, where he played Joaquin Tiant. He frequently collaborated with Andy Garcia and Robert Rodriguez.

== Death ==
Mechoso died of a heart attack at his home in Burbank, California, at the age of 62.

== Filmography ==
- 1979/80 - Que Pasa USA (First Bi-Lingual English Spanish Show on PBS Nationally). Played Disco Club cashier.
- 1983 Guaguasi as Ernestico
- 1984-1988 Miami Vice as Lester Kosko
- 1986 Flight of the Navigator as Hangar Guard #1
- 1988 Police Academy 5: Assignment Miami Beach as Shooting Range Cop
- 1990 Internal Affairs as Cousin Gregory
- 1990 The Take (TV Movie)
- 1990 Midnight Caller (TV Series) as Ozzie Minoso
- 1992 Live! From Death Row (TV Movie) as Reyes
- 1992 Deep Cover as Detective Hernandez
- 1992 Toys as Cortez
- 1994 Dead Connection as Linen Suit
- 1994 A Perry Mason Mystery: The Case of the Lethal Lifestyle (TV Movie)
- 1994 A Million to Juan as Corn Seller
- 1994 Menendez: A Killing in Beverly Hills (TV Movie) as Lieutenant Arguello
- 1994 The Glass Shield as Assistant District Attorney
- 1995 Seinfeld (TV Series) as Julio
- 1995 Bad Boys as Detective Ruiz
- 1995 A Pyromaniac's Love Story as Jerry
- 1996 White Squall as Girard Pascal
- 1997 Vegas Vacation as Limo Driver
- 1997 'Til There Was You as Mover
- 1997 Mad City as Air Force Sergeant
- 1997 Switchback as Jorge Martinez
- 1998 Krippendorf's Tribe as Professor Simon Alonso
- 1999 Tracey Takes On...
- 1999 Virus as "Squeaky"
- 1999 Molly as Baseball Fan
- 1999 Blue Streak as Detective Diaz
- 2000 For Love or Country: The Arturo Sandoval Story (TV Movie) as Jaime Arrondo
- 2000 All the Pretty Horses as Captain Raul
- 2001 Heartbreakers as Leo
- 2001 Tortilla Soup as Gomez
- 2001 Jurassic Park III as Enrique Cardoso
- 2002 Pumpkin as Dr. Frederico Cruz
- 2002 Ken Park as Peaches' Father
- 2002 Phone Booth as Medic
- 2002 Assassination Tango as Orlando
- 2003 Bookies as Martinez
- 2003 Once Upon a Time in Mexico as Nicholas, Presidential Advisor
- 2003 A Simple Choice (Short) as Gus
- 2005 Lords of Dogtown as Mr. Alva
- 2005 Wheelmen as Mario
- 2005 The Lost City as Colonel Candela
- 2005 The Legend of Zorro as Frey Felipe
- 2005 Ghost Whisperer (TV Series) as Gilbert de la Costa
- 2006 Little Miss Sunshine as The Mechanic
- 2006 Grey's Anatomy (TV Series) as Chuck Eaton
- 2006 The Virgin of Juarez as (Uncredited)
- 2006 Good Cop, Bad Cop as Ramirez
- 2007 The Go-Getter as Sergio Leone
- 2007 Grindhouse as Romy (segment "Planet Terror")
- 2007 Her Best Move as Umberto
- 2007 Rise: Blood Hunter as Arturo
- 2007 The Death and Life of Bobby Z as Detective Martinez
- 2007 Planet Terror as Romy
- 2008 Winged Creatures as Detective Cavalis
- 2009 Nip/Tuck (TV Series) as Dr. Hans
- 2009 Janky Promoters as John Glanville
- 2010 The Big Bang Theory (TV Series) as Police Officer
- 2010 Fire Bay as Agustino
- 2011 Magic City Memoirs as Alejandro Acosta
- 2011 Wizards of Waverly Place (TV Series) as DMV Instructor
- 2012 The Baytown Outlaws as "Padre"
- 2012 A Dark Truth as The Guide
- 2013 Machete Kills as Chepo
- 2014 Last Weekend as Hector Castillo
- 2014 Cake as Dr. Mata
- 2014 The Forger as Raul Carlos
- 2016 Transpecos as Miguel Herandez
- 2016 Rules Don't Apply as President Anastasio Somoza Debayle
- 2017 Inheritance as Teddy's Father (final film role)

== See also ==
- List of people from Miami
