= Bobby Z =

Bobby Z may refer to:

== People ==
- Bob Dylan (born 1941), American musician, born Robert Zimmerman
- Robert Zemeckis (born 1952), American director, occasionally nicknamed "Bobbie Z"
- Bobby Z. (born 1956), American musician
- Bobby Zamora (born 1981), English footballer
- Bobby Z (wrestler) (born 1991), Mexican professional wrestler

== Film ==
- The Death and Life of Bobby Z, a 2007 action film
