= Ghost Team One =

- Film poster
- Directed by: Ben Peyser
- Written by: Andrew Knauer
- Produced by: Adam Mutchler
- Starring: Carlos Santos; J. R. Villarreal; Fernanda Romero
- Cinematography: Ben Peyser
- Edited by: John DeJesus
- Music by: Mike Plas
- Production company: Hermany Perla Films
- Distributed by: Paramount Home Media
- Release dates: January 20, 2013 (Slamdance); October 11, 2013
- Running time: 84 minutes
- Country: United States
- Language: English

Ghost Team One is a 2013 independent comedy horror film directed by Scott Rutherford and Ben Peyser, and starring Carlos Santos and J. R. Villarreal as two roommates who try to prove their house is haunted in order to impress a beautiful girl played by Fernanda Romero. The film premiered at the 2013 Slamdance Film Festival and was released in theaters on October 11, 2013.

== Characters ==
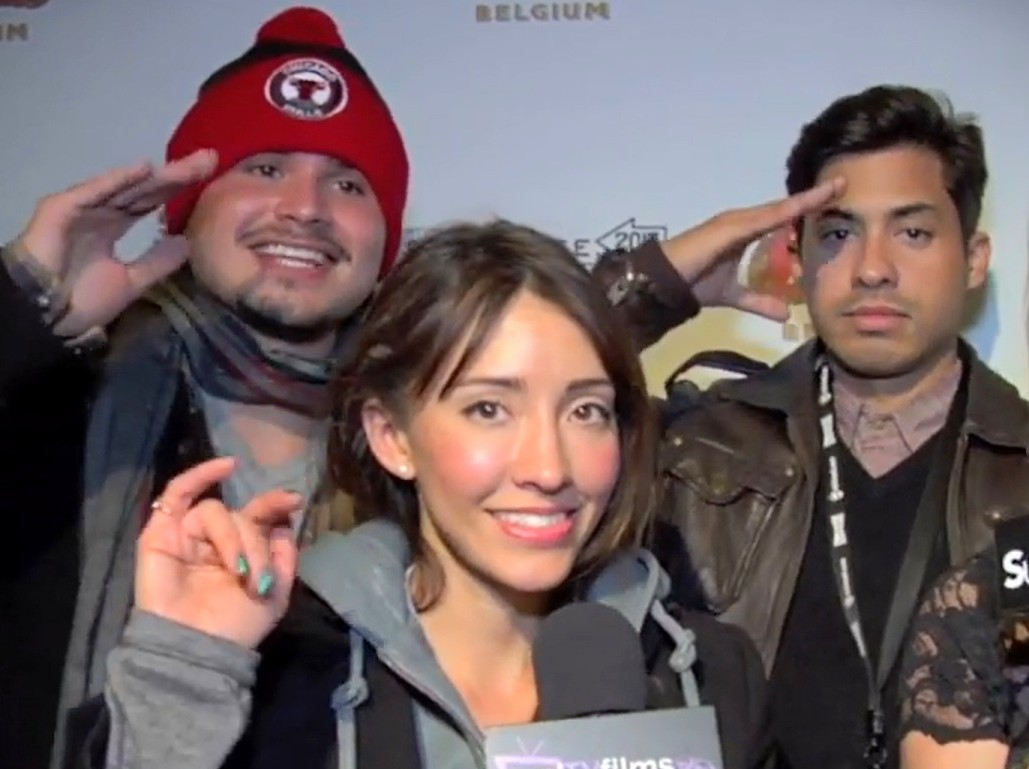
Cast of film. Left to right: J. R. Villareal, Fernanda Romero, Carlos Santos

- Carlos Santos as Sergio
- J. R. Villarreal as Brad
- Fernanda Romero as Fernanda
- Tony Cavalero as Chuck
- Meghan Falcone as Becky
- James Babson as JW Menapace
- Scott MacArthur as Elder Kent
- Craig Stott as Elder Ammon
- Damien Boisseau as Sergio

== Reception ==
Ghost Team One was released theatrically nationwide by Paramount Studios on October 11, 2013. The film received mixed reviews, with a 36% approval rating on Rotten Tomatoes. Andy Webster of The New York Times credited the success of the film to "... the improvisational energy of Mr. Santos and Mr. Villarreal, whose ease, chemistry and humor never flag".

Jeff Shannon of The Seattle Times wrote "Destined to be a streaming-video hit with truant frat boys everywhere".

Rob Staeger of The Village Voice commented "Thanks to the shakiest of shaky-cams, you don't know whether to wince or lose your lunch".

According to Inkoo Kang of the Los Angeles Times, "The scariest thing about Ghost Team One is the horror-comedy's blatant racial minstrelsy".

Writing for The Philadelphia Inquirer, Tirdad Derakhshani called a film "A terrible yet lovable take on the haunted-house yarn".
