= Detective Pikachu (film) =

2019 film directed by Rob Letterman

Pokémon Detective Pikachu
- Theatrical release poster
- Directed by: Rob Letterman
- Screenplay by: Dan Hernandez Benji Samit; Rob Letterman; Derek Connolly
- Story by: Dan Hernandez; Benji Samit; Nicole Perlman
- Based on: Detective Pikachu by Creatures Inc. (Note: Detective Pikachu was developed by Creatures Inc., directed by Naoki Miyashita, written by Tomokazu Ohara and Haruka Utsui, and published by Nintendo and The Pokémon Company; The Pokémon Company is owned by Nintendo, Game Freak, and Creatures Inc.)
- Produced by: Mary Parent; Cale Boyter; Hidenaga Katakami; Don McGowan
- Starring: Ryan Reynolds; Justice Smith; Kathryn Newton; Suki Waterhouse; Omar Chaparro; Chris Geere; Ken Watanabe; Bill Nighy
- Cinematography: John Mathieson
- Edited by: Mark Sanger; James Thomas
- Music by: Henry Jackman
- Production companies: Legendary Pictures; The Pokémon Company
- Distributed by: Warner Bros. Pictures (Worldwide); Toho Co., Ltd. (Japan)
- Release dates: May 3, 2019 (Japan); May 10, 2019 (United States)
- Running time: 104 minutes
- Countries: United States; Japan
- Language: English
- Budget: $150 million
- Box office: $433 million

Pokémon Detective Pikachu (Note: Known simply as Detective Pikachu, and released as Great Detective Pikachu (Japanese: 名探偵ピカチュウ, Hepburn: Meitantei Pikachū) in Japan after the original game's title in the respective region.) is a 2019 urban fantasy mystery film and the first live-action film based on the Pokémon franchise. It is loosely based on the 2016 video game Detective Pikachu. Directed by Rob Letterman, who co-wrote it with Derek Connolly, Dan Hernandez and Benji Samit. The film stars Ryan Reynolds as the voice and motion capture of Pikachu, with Justice Smith, Kathryn Newton, Suki Waterhouse, Omar Chaparro, Chris Geere, Ken Watanabe and Bill Nighy in live-action roles. The plot follows Detective Pikachu and his partner Tim Goodman as they attempt to solve the mysterious disappearance of Tim's father, Harry. Filming took place from January to May 2018 in Colorado, England, and Scotland.

Detective Pikachu was released in Japan on May 3, 2019, and in the United States on May 10, by Warner Bros. Pictures. The film received generally positive reviews from critics and grossed $433 million against a $150 million budget, becoming the fifth-highest grossing video game film adaptation of all time.

== Plot ==
Tim Goodman gave up his dream of being a Pokémon Trainer following the death of his mother and his estrangement from his father Harry, a police detective who moved to Ryme City, where humans and Pokémon live together side by side, while participating in Pokémon battles, being a Trainer and having Poké Balls are illegal. Tim is informed by Harry's friend, Lieutenant Hideo Yoshida, that Harry died in a car accident. Tim travels to Ryme City and goes to Harry's apartment to sort things out, being surprised by Harry's Pokémon partner, a deerstalker-clad amnesiac Pikachu, whom only Tim can understand. Tim accidentally releases a purple gas known as "R" from a vial he finds in Harry's office; they are attacked by a group of Aipom (Note: The name Pokémon is identical in the singular and plural, as is each individual species name; it is grammatically correct to say 'one Pokémon' and 'many Pokémon', as well as 'one Pikachu" and 'many Pikachu'.") who became aggressive under the gas' influence.

Pikachu believes that Harry survived the crash, as the police never found his body. They meet an informant of Harry's, a Mr. Mime, who directs them to an illegal underground Pokémon battle arena. The arena is raided by police and Tim and Pikachu are arrested. They are brought to Yoshida, who reveals footage of Harry's crash, explaining that Harry having survived would have been impossible.

Tim and Pikachu are contacted by Howard Clifford, the founder and former chairman of Clifford Industries and of Ryme City. He uses advanced holographic imagery to show them the crash; the hologram was recreated from police footage and allows them to see what police officers cannot or do not want them to see. The hologram reveals that Harry was abducted by a genetically engineered Pokémon called Mewtwo, who seemingly caused the crash and erased Pikachu's memory of the incident. Howard reveals that his son, the current chairman of Clifford Enterprises, Roger Clifford, is the mastermind of the R gas. Tim and Pikachu recruit junior reporter Lucy Stevens and her Psyduck, and travel to the abandoned genetics laboratory Harry was investigating. Through advanced holographic imagery, Tim and Pikachu discover that Mewtwo's DNA was used to create the R gas and Harry was tasked with capturing him. Roger releases power-enhanced Greninja that attack them. They manage to escape and survive a field of growth-enhanced Torterra, but Pikachu becomes severely injured. A Bulbasaur leads Tim and Pikachu to Mewtwo, who heals Pikachu. Mewtwo begins to reveal how Pikachu helped him escape from the lab, only to be abducted by Roger. Believing that he betrayed Harry, Pikachu leaves Tim.

Pikachu soon comes across the scene of the crash and finds a water shuriken. He deduces that the Greninja were sent to cause the crash and Mewtwo was trying to protect him and Harry from them. Remembering that Howard's hologram included the specific angle of the Greninja attack, which was a detail that police reports lacked, Pikachu realizes that Howard is the true mastermind behind the R gas. Back at Ryme City, Tim goes to Howard's office where Howard reveals his true nature. He uses a neural link headband to transfer his consciousness from his body into Mewtwo. He explains how Mewtwo can fuse humans with Pokémon when they are in a crazed state. He believes that merging humans and Pokémon is the key to future prosperity. He additionally reveals he arranged for Harry to be killed when he learned too much about his plot.

Howard unleashes the gas on the city from parade balloons and starts fusing humans with Pokémon, including Lucy and Yoshida. Pikachu arrives and fights Mewtwo, while Tim discovers that Roger, who appeared to be working in tandem with his father, is actually Howard's Pokémon partner, a Ditto; the real Roger was tied up and gagged because he additionally disapproved of his father's plot. Tim manages to defeat Howard by removing his headset, freeing Mewtwo, who separates the people from their Pokémon. As Howard is arrested, Roger vows to undo his father's misdeeds and tasks Lucy with spearheading the media coverage.

Mewtwo explains that Harry had tried to save him from Howard and helped him escape, but was attacked by the Greninja. He decided to heal Harry's wounded body, which was when Pikachu volunteered to have his consciousness fused with Harry's in order to continue their investigation. As a result, the experience erased both Harry's and Pikachu's memories. Mewtwo separates the two and Tim reunites with his father in his human body. Tim then decides to stay in Ryme City to become a detective and spend more time with Harry and Pikachu.

== Cast ==
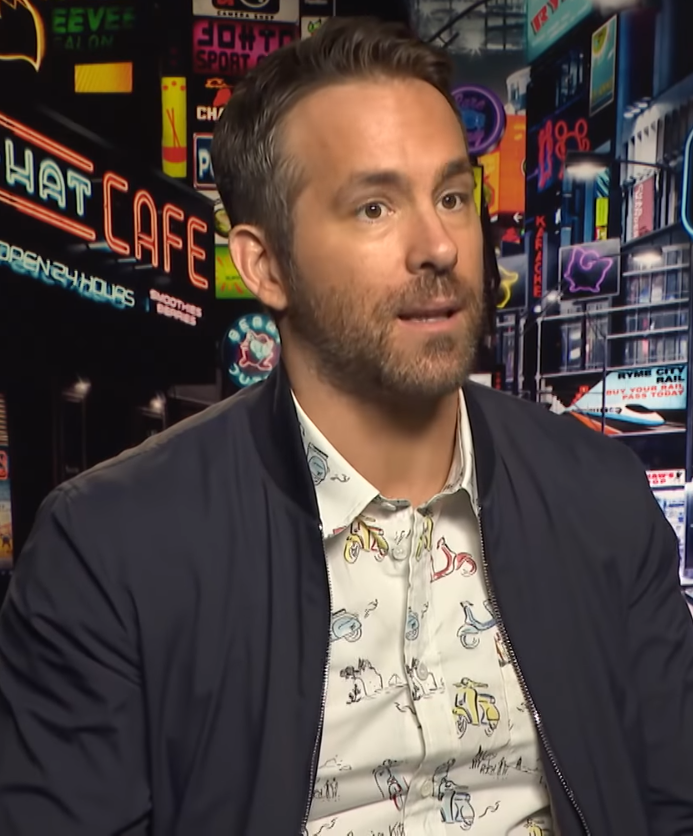
Ryan Reynolds (pictured in 2019) provides the voice and motion capture of Detective Pikachu.

- Ryan Reynolds as:
  - Detective Pikachu, a world-class detective and exceptionally intelligent talking Pikachu that only Tim can understand. Reynolds provided both the voice and motion capture for the character.
    - Ikue Ōtani provides Detective Pikachu's normal voice as heard by the citizens of Ryme City other than Tim. Ōtani reprises her role from the Pokémon anime and video games.
  - Harry Goodman, Tim's missing widowed father and a Ryme City police detective.
- Justice Smith as Tim Goodman, a former aspiring Pokémon Trainer and insurance agent looking for his missing father. He is additionally Detective Pikachu's partner and the only person capable of hearing him speak.
  - Max Fincham additionally portrayed the character's younger self in a flashback.
- Kathryn Newton as Lucy Stevens, a junior reporter who is accompanied by her Psyduck.
- Suki Waterhouse as Ms. Norman, a female bodyguard for Howard Clifford who is actually his genetically modified Ditto.
- Omar Chaparro as Sebastian, a Pokémon Trainer who runs a secret Ryme City Pokémon battle arena and is accompanied by his Charizard.
- Chris Geere as Roger Clifford, Howard's son who is president of CMN and Clifford Industries.
- Ken Watanabe as Lieutenant Hideo Yoshida, a veteran Ryme City police lieutenant and friend of Harry who is accompanied by his Snubbull. Watanabe additionally provided his own lines in the Japanese version.
- Bill Nighy as Howard Clifford, Roger's disabled father and the visionary behind Ryme City and founder of Clifford Industries.
- Rita Ora as Doctor Ann Laurent, a scientist for Clifford Enterprises experimenting on Mewtwo.
- Karan Soni as Jack, Tim's friend who is a Pokémon Trainer and encourages him to catch a Cubone.
- Josette Simon as "Grams", Tim's grandmother who took care of him after the death of her daughter, Tim's mother.
- Kadiff Kirwan as Ryme City's unnamed mayor.
- Rina Hoshino and Kotaro Watanabe as Mewtwo (vocal performance/motion capture), a human-made Pokémon that is targeted by Howard Clifford for its abilities.
- Rachael Lillis as Jigglypuff (via archival recordings).

Additionally, Diplo appears as the disk jockey who performs at Sebastian's Pokémon arena while serving as its master of ceremonies. Abbie Murphy appears as Cynthia McMaster. Simone Ashley and Edward Davis appear as a couple whom Tim attempts to convince he has a talking Pikachu to. Ryoma Takeuchi, who provides the Japanese dubbed voice of Tim, has a cameo as a Pokémon Trainer in a video Tim watches. In a deleted scene, Rob Delaney appears as a co-worker of Tim at the insurance company. Ralph Foody and Michael Guido respectively appear as Johnny and Snakes, characters from Home Alone's film within a film Angels with Filthy Souls, via archive footage from the former film.

== Production ==
=== Development ===
Following a bidding war in April 2016 which resulted in Legendary Entertainment's acquisition of the film rights to Pokémon in, a live-action adaptation of Detective Pikachu was announced in July that same year, as a collaboration between Legendary and the Pokémon Company. The Pokémon Company and Rob Letterman wanted to adapt Detective Pikachu because of their interest in making a film that focused on another character besides Ash Ketchum, the protagonist of the Pokémon animated TV series. On the premise, Letterman stated, "The Pokémon Company, they've already made many, many movies of Ash, and they came to Legendary with this idea of using a new character. So when I came onboard, I was pitched this character of Detective Pikachu, and I fell in love with the story behind it." The idea of talking Pokémon originated from an early concept for the 1990s TV series, but was scrapped when the original game developer, Game Freak, was unsatisfied with the concept. The idea was revived for the 2016 Detective Pikachu spin-off game. Letterman said that they "spent a year designing all the characters ahead of shooting so that we could get it all right".

On November 30, 2016, Letterman was officially hired to direct the film, and the studio fast-tracked production to start in 2017. Earlier, on August 16, 2016, Nicole Perlman and Alex Hirsch were in negotiations with Legendary to write the screenplay. Later revisions were provided by Eric Pearson, Thomas McCarthy, Derek Connolly, Dan Hernandez, Benji Samit and Letterman. Ultimately, Hernandez, Samit, Letterman, and Connolly received screenplay credit, while Hernandez, Samit and Perlman received "story by" billing.

=== Casting ===
In November 2017, Justice Smith was cast in the lead human role, with Kathryn Newton added to costar after an intense session of reading and testing actresses opposite Smith. Newton beat out Natalia Dyer, Haley Lu Richardson, and Katherine Langford for the role. In December 2017, Ryan Reynolds was cast in the title role, portrayed via motion-capture and voice over. Other actors considered for the role of Pikachu were Danny DeVito, Dwayne Johnson, Mark Wahlberg and Hugh Jackman. In January 2018, with production commencing, Ken Watanabe, Bill Nighy and Chris Geere joined the cast, followed by Suki Waterhouse and Rita Ora in February and Omar Chaparro in April. In January 2019, Rob Delaney had previously stated that he had a role, but he does not appear in the final cut of the film.

The German-language dub was produced by FFS Film- & Fernseh-Synchron in Berlin, with Marco Eßer voicing Tim Goodman, played by Justice Smith. Eßer said that the German dialogue underwent several rounds of review to ensure consistency with Pokémon names and pronunciation, and that his portrayal followed Smith's original performance closely.

=== Filming ===
Principal production began on January 15, 2018, in London, England and Denver, Colorado. Nine days later, Legendary announced that principal photography had officially begun. Much of the on set interaction was provided in the form of puppetry performed by Mikey Brett with on set vocal reference performed by Cornelius Geaney Jr. via in-ear devices, enabling both Justice Smith and the Pikachu puppeteer to hear the dialogue without it being picked up by microphones on set. Some additional temporary vocals for Pikachu were filled in by Jon Bailey. However, all of this temporary dialogue was dubbed over by Ryan Reynolds. Principal photography concluded on May 1, 2018. Some filming took place at Shepperton Studios, Warner Bros. Studios, Leavesden, and Minley Woods in Hampshire, rural areas of Colorado, just outside Denver and Colorado Springs; and Scotland. Filming also took place on Anchor Wharf at the Chatham Historic Dockyard in Kent.

The film's cinematographer, John Mathieson, noted that, like his other films, Detective Pikachu was shot on traditional film, in contrast to most other contemporary films which are shot digitally. He said the use of traditional film helps make it "look more realistic".

=== Visual effects ===
The film's visual effects were provided by the Moving Picture Company (MPC), Framestore, Image Engine, Rodeo FX, and Instinctual VFX. Much of the visual effects were provided by the same team behind The Jungle Book, Fantastic Beasts and Where to Find Them, and The Lion King. Letterman compared the visual effects to the character of Rocket Raccoon from Guardians of the Galaxy: "They're technically, some of the most high-end visual effects in the world... It's completely photo-realistic, like they are alive and in the movie." Additional audio recording of a fight between Detective Pikachu and Charizard was recorded during the 2018 Pokémon World Championships.

== Music ==
Henry Jackman, who previously collaborated with Letterman on Monsters vs. Aliens (2009) and Gulliver's Travels (2010), provided the score for the film and arranged Junichi Masuda's "Red & Blue Theme" for the film's end credits. Kygo and Rita Ora released a standalone single for the film, titled "Carry On". The song and the music video were released on April 19, 2019. Honest Boyz also collaborated with Lil Uzi Vert to make another song for the film, titled "Electricity" and produced by Pharrell Williams, which also plays over the end credits.

== Marketing ==
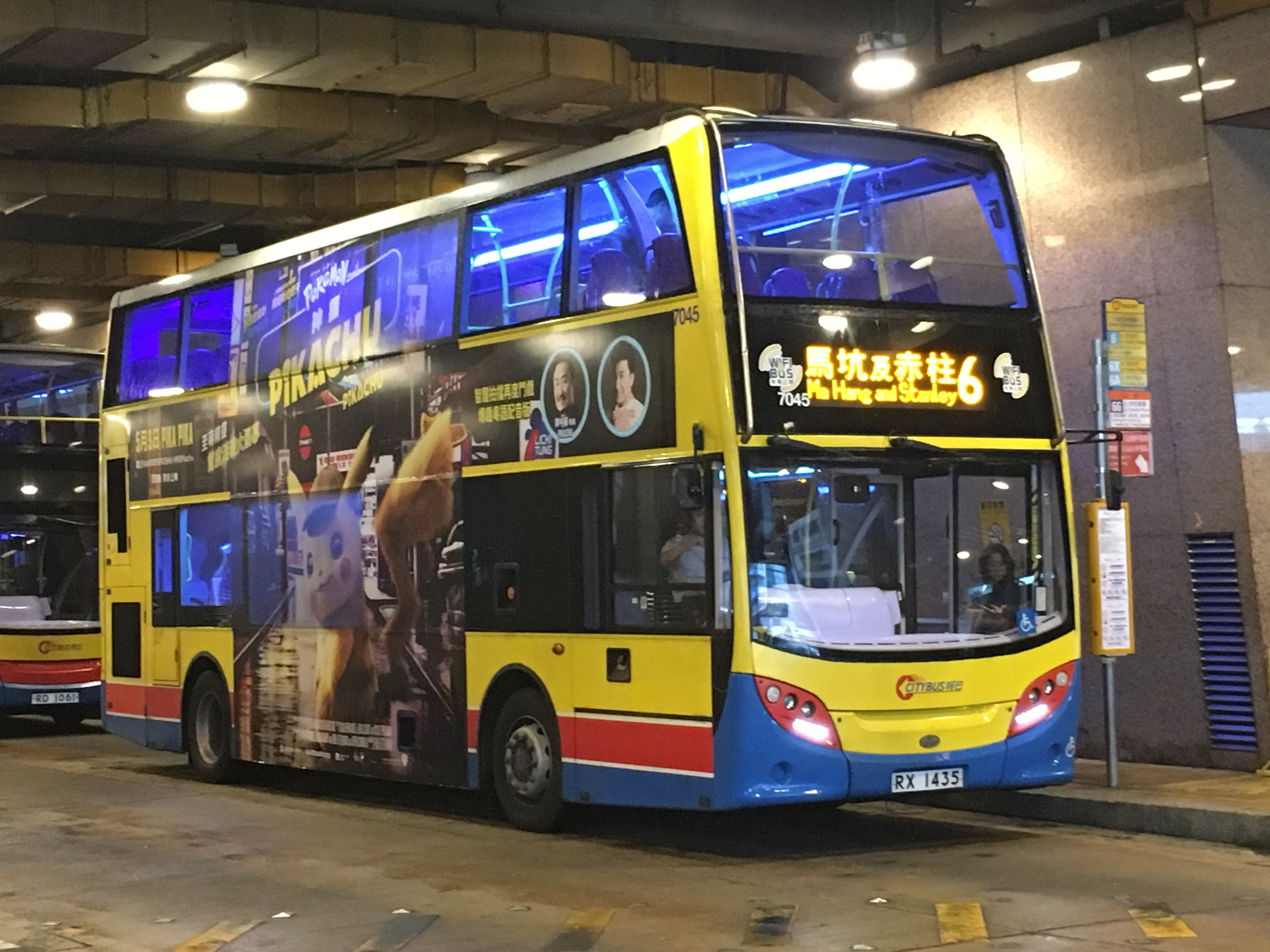
Bus promoting the film in Hong Kong

In early November 2018, with the film in the post-production phase, a screen test was held for an incomplete version of the film, which drew positive reactions from the test audience.

The film's first official trailer was released on November 12, 2018. Warner Bros. revealed versions of the trailer in English along with dubbed versions in Spanish, French, Italian and German. It soon became the top trending video on YouTube, and a top trending topic on Twitter, while inspiring numerous internet memes and reaction videos. Within 24 hours, the high-concept trailer amassed more than 100 million views across multiple online and social media platforms. On YouTube, the English-language trailer garnered over 1 million likes within two days, and 1.22 million likes within five days. On Twitter, it set a new record of over 400,000 mentions on the day of the trailer reveal. The film was supported by a $100 million marketing budget.

On November 30, 2018, Letterman, Smith, and Newton appeared on stage during the Tokyo Comic-Con event.

On May 7, 2019, a Warner Bros. YouTube channel named "Inspector Pikachu" uploaded a video purporting to be a bootleg recording of the film. Spanning nearly 1.75 hours in length, the opening minute shows the production logo sequences followed by a scene from the film featuring Tim Goodman, before spending the remainder of its runtime depicting Pikachu performing aerobics to an upbeat, 1980s-inspired synthwave tune. Reynolds aided in the prank, posting on Twitter as if he was alerting Warner Bros. and the film's official accounts about the alleged bootleg. The video, which Paul Tassi of Forbes described as "brilliant", received 4.2 million views in less than a day.

=== Merchandise and other tie-ins ===
On March 15, 2019, it was revealed that Legendary will release a graphic novel based on the film. Niantic Labs promoted the film through the Pokémon Go app, by featuring, among other things, select Pokémon from the movie appear in the game, including a limited edition "detective" version of Pikachu. The Pokémon Company released a series of trading cards featuring images from the film, including a limited edition Detective Pikachu character card only available the first weekend of the film's release. Along with TCG booster pack sets, they produced a limited edition Detective Pikachu Cafe Figure Collection bundle. A set of six Detective Pikachu toys were also sold at Burger King. Wicked Cool Toys, the current toy partner for the franchise, released figures and plush toys for retail as well.

== Release ==
=== Theatrical ===
==== Japan ====
Initially, Universal Pictures was due to handle distribution outside Japan, while Toho would handle the Japanese distribution. On July 25, 2018, Warner Bros. Pictures announced they had taken over worldwide distribution duties (except in Japan and China) from Universal, with the release date unchanged. Warner Bros. also got the film rights for the Pokémon franchise for 30 years. The film received a PG rating from the MPAA, being the first Pokémon film released in the United States not to receive a G rating.

When the film's Japanese release was announced on November 29, 2018, Ryoma Takeuchi was confirmed to voice Tim Goodman in the Japanese version. Takeuchi also has a brief cameo appearance in the film itself as a Pokémon trainer. On March 20, 2019, it was confirmed that Marie Iitoyo would voice Lucy Stevens and Ken Watanabe would reprise his role as Detective Yoshida, in the Japanese dub. When the film premiered in Japan on May 3, 2019, Hidetoshi Nishijima was confirmed to have voiced Detective Pikachu in the Japanese dub.

==== International ====
The US premiere was held on May 3, 2019, in New York and featured a yellow carpet.

Detective Pikachu was released in Europe on May 8, 2019, in South Korea, Hong Kong, Singapore, New Zealand, and Australia on May 9, 2019, and May 10, 2019, in China, the UK, Ireland, Canada and the US.

=== Home media ===
Detective Pikachu was released on Digital HD on July 23, 2019, and was released on Ultra HD Blu-ray, Blu-ray and DVD on August 6, 2019.

The film debuted at the DVD and Blu-ray charts upon the week of its release, and was the second top-selling home video title in August 2019 (after Avengers: Endgame). As of August 2020, the DVD and Blu-ray releases of Detective Pikachu have earned more than $30 million in the United States.

== Reception ==
=== Box office ===
Detective Pikachu grossed $144 million in the United States and Canada, and $289 million in other territories, for a worldwide total of $433 million, against a production budget of $150 million.

In the United States and Canada, the film was released alongside Tolkien, Poms and The Hustle, and was projected to gross $50–70 million from 4,202 theaters. The film made $20.7 million on its first day, including $5.7 million from Thursday night previews, both records for a film based on a video game. Detective Pikachu went on to debut to $54.4 million, finishing second at the weekend box office behind holdover Avengers: Endgame, though it did top the Friday box office on its opening day. At the time, it was the best-ever opening for a video game film, (the record was broken the following year by Sonic the Hedgehog with $58 million) and was also the sixth-highest total for a film that did not debut number one at the box office. In its second weekend, the film made $24.8 million, finishing third behind John Wick: Chapter 3 – Parabellum and Avengers: Endgame, and then made $13.3 million in its third weekend, finishing fourth.

In other territories, the film was projected to debut to $90–120 million from 62 countries, including $40–60 million in China. Prior to its worldwide release, the film grossed $21 million from openings and previews in several international markets, including Japan, through Thursday. The film had an international opening weekend debut of $103 million (and a five-day debut of $112.4 million), dethroning Avengers: Endgame at the top of the international box office. Detective Pikachu topped the international box office again in its second weekend. Despite breaking records, the film fell below expectations due to the high budget.

In Japan, the film opened at number three (behind Detective Conan: The Fist of Blue Sapphire and Avengers: Endgame), grossing ¥948 million ($8.6 million) in its opening weekend, before topping the box office in its second weekend, with a cumulative ¥1,465,395,700 ($13,327,837). In China, Detective Pikachu had an opening day gross of $16.4 million, and topped the box office with a weekend debut of $40.8 million. It topped the Chinese box office again in its second week, with a cumulative $69.3 million. In the United Kingdom, it topped the box office with a £4.9 million ($6.6 million) debut. As of May 26, 2019, the film's largest international markets are China ($84.4 million), Japan ($21.2 million), the United Kingdom ($13.6 million), Mexico ($10.4 million), and Germany ($9.5 million).

=== Critical response ===
The design of Detective Pikachu and Ryan Reynolds's portrayal of the character received critical praise.

On Rotten Tomatoes, the film has an approval rating of 68% based on 316 reviews and an average rating of 6/10. The website's critical consensus reads, "Pokémon Detective Pikachu may not take its wonderfully bizarre premise as far as it could have, but this offbeat adaptation should catch most – if not all – of the franchise's fans." It was the first international theatrical live-action video game adaptation to maintain a "fresh" rating and it was the highest rated video game adaptation on the site, until it was surpassed by The Angry Birds Movie 2. On Metacritic, it has a weighted average score of 53 out of 100, based on reviews from 48 critics, indicating "mixed or average reviews". Audiences polled by CinemaScore gave the film an average grade of "A−" on an A+ to F scale, and general audiences polled by PostTrak gave it 4 out of 5 stars.

Scott Mendelson of Forbes called the film "the best video game movie ever" and wrote, "Detective Pikachu works because it's a good movie first and a promising franchise-starter or a brand cash-in second. It's a real film, rooted in character arcs and narrative twists with just enough raw emotion and personal stakes to make the significant special effects moments matter beyond spectacle." CNET's Sean Keane called it the best film ever based on a video game, saying it achieves the balance of appealing to existing fans as well as potential new audiences. Keane praised Reynolds performance and called the film "an entertaining romp with plenty of heart". Clarisse Loughrey of The Independent gave the film 3/5 stars, noting the film's similarities to Who Framed Roger Rabbit and that it did not attempt to familiarize viewers with the franchise, but stated that it "feels more intriguing than it does derivative, and it's a delight for fans to see how immersive this world actually feels." Simran Hans of The Observer gave the film 4/5 stars, writing: "What's clever is the way this live-action spinoff exploits nostalgia for the family-friendly blockbusters of the late 1980s and the 1990s... rather than the Japanese "Pocket Monsters" themselves."

Writing for The Hollywood Reporter, Michael Rechtshaffen said, "Although the script ... tends to compartmentalize the comedy, action and emotional bits rather than organically blending them all together, Letterman's energetic direction manages to hold everything aloft." Alonso Duralde's mixed review for TheWrap describes the film as feeling "both ambitious and lazy, frenzied and sluggish". Peter Debruge of Variety was critical of the plot and the special effects: "Though consistent with the games ... the story of Detective Pikachu doesn't allow nearly enough Pokémon-related action, while the quality of the computer animation ... falls far short of the basic level of competency audiences have come to expect from effects movies." Debruge was also critical of the central pairing of Pikachu and Tim Goodman, saying the relationship lacks chemistry. Kate Erbland of Indiewire gave the film a mixed review, praising the "awe-inspiring" visuals but criticizing the messy plot, saying that "no amount of technical polish can detract from a thin narrative that confuses far more than it amuses", and complaining that many of the best jokes were in the trailer.

=== Accolades ===
Award	Date of ceremony	Category	Recipient(s)	Result	Ref(s)
Teen Choice Awards	August 11, 2019	Choice Comedy Movie	Detective Pikachu	Nominated	
Teen Choice Awards	August 11, 2019	Choice Comedy Movie Actor	Ryan Reynolds	Nominated	
Teen Choice Awards	August 11, 2019	Choice Movie Song	Kygo and Rita Ora for "Carry On"	Nominated	
People's Choice Awards	November 10, 2019	Family Movie of 2019	Detective Pikachu	Nominated	
People's Choice Awards	November 10, 2019	Favorite Animated Movie Star	Ryan Reynolds	Nominated	
Hollywood Post Alliance	November 21, 2019	Outstanding Visual Effects – Feature Film	Detective Pikachu	Nominated	
Hollywood Critics Association	January 9, 2020	Best Visual Effects or Animated Performance	Ryan Reynolds	Nominated	
Annie Awards	January 25, 2020	Outstanding Achievement for Character Animation in a Live Action Production	Dale Newton, Waiyin Mendoza, Rochelle Flynn, Leila Gaed and Paul Jones	Nominated	

== Future ==
In January 2019, months ahead of the release of Detective Pikachu, Legendary announced that a sequel was already in development, with Oren Uziel signed on as screenwriter. However, on May 3, 2021, Justice Smith said regarding a potential sequel: "I think we have to just kind of bury our hopes. I don't think it's going to happen. I really hope so though". In February 2023, a representative from Legendary Entertainment said that a sequel is still "in active development". In March 2023, it was reported that Jonathan Krisel would direct the sequel and that Chris Galletta would write the screenplay.

By 2024, journalists concluded that the sequel had gotten stuck in development hell. In January of that year, Justice Smith stated that he had not received any calls or updates from the studio. In August 2024, Game Freak suffered a data breach resulting in the theft of employees' personal data, as well as info regarding upcoming games. The leaked files also included major plot details for the sequel, titled The Great Detective Pikachu, and revealed that Jordan Vogt-Roberts was set to direct it. The studio had scheduled a release for 2024, but for unknown reasons, the movie did not materialize. Logan Moore of ComicBook.com concluded this suggested "the film fell apart internally and is no longer happening, or it could simply be on hold".

== See also ==
- List of films based on video games
- List of Pokémon films
