= Magic City Memoirs =

- Theatrical release poster
- Directed by: Aaron J. Salgado
- Written by: Aaron J. Salgado
- Story by: Aaron J. Salgado; Jose Daniel Freixas
- Produced by: Jose Daniel Freixas
- Starring: Natalie Martinez; Dominik Garcia-Lorido; Nestor Serrano; Julio Oscar Mechoso; J. R. Villarreal; Michael Cardelle
- Cinematography: Gustavo Penna
- Edited by: Aaron J. Salgado; Jokes Yanes
- Production companies: 3-Star Entertainment; Cinderbugz Productions; CineSon Entertainment
- Release dates: March 11, 2011 (Miami); November 2, 2015 (Netflix)
- Country: United States
- Language: English

Magic City Memoirs is a 2011 American coming of age drama film directed by Aaron J. Salgado, and stars Natalie Martinez, Dominik Garcia-Lorido, Nestor Serrano, Julio Oscar Mechoso, J. R. Villarreal and Michael Cardelle. The film is based on the true stories from Salgado's adolescence.

The film takes place in Miami, Florida, and follows the story of three lifelong friends, from very different backgrounds, who are on the verge of high school graduation who indulge in reckless behavior that finds them on the brink of either their graduation or their mortality.

== Synopsis ==
Magic City Memoirs follows the lives of three lifelong friends: Mikey Acosta, Angel and Stok. Mikey Acosta is a star high school baseball prospect, while Angel is a whiz of a student as well as the son of a prominent Miami politician. Stok is the son of an incarcerated drug lord. These three best friends attempt to navigate through their senior year amongst the pressures and temptations of the city.

== Cast ==
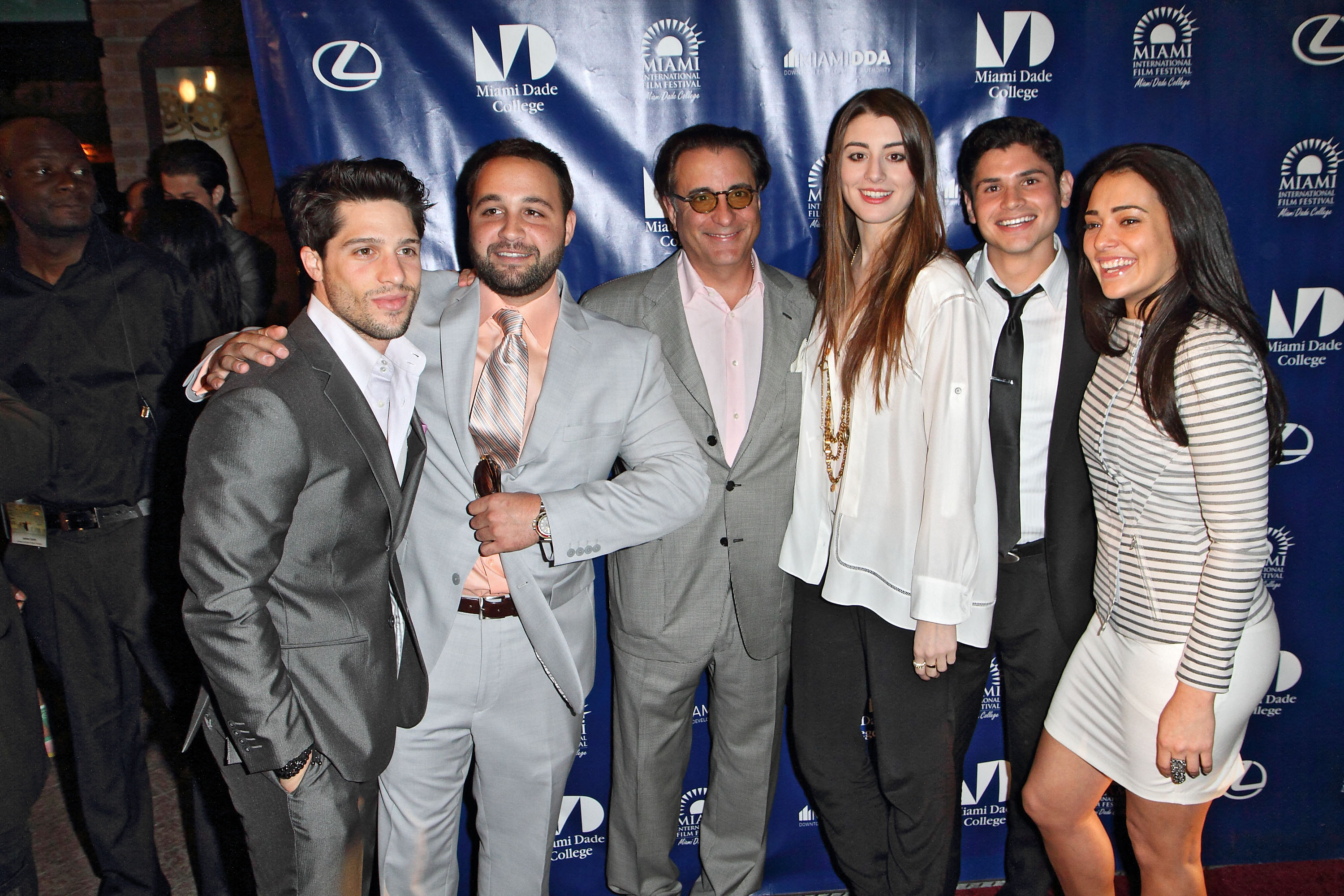
The cast of Cast of Magic City Memoirs at the World Premiere of the film at the 2011 Miami International Film Festival. From left: Michael Francis Cardelle, Andres Dominguez, Andy Garcia, Dominik Garcia-Lorido, J. R. Villarreal, Natalie Martinez

- Natalie Martinez as Mari
- Dominik Garcia-Lorido as Veronica Suarez
- Nestor Serrano as Angel Suarez Sr.
- Julio Oscar Mechoso as Alejandro Acosta
- J. R. Villarreal as Mikey Acosta
- Michael Cardelle as Angel Suarez Jr.
- Andres Dominguez as Stok
- Jordi Vilasuso as Eric
- Granville Adams as Scout

== Release ==
The film premiered at the Miami International Film Festival, where it won the Pursuit of Perfection Award.

== Accolades ==
List of awards and nominations
Award	Category	Recipients and nominees	Result
Miami International Film Festival	Pursuit of Perfection Award	Aaron J. Salgado; Andy García	Won
