= J. R. Villarreal =

Mexican-American actor and producer (born 1992)

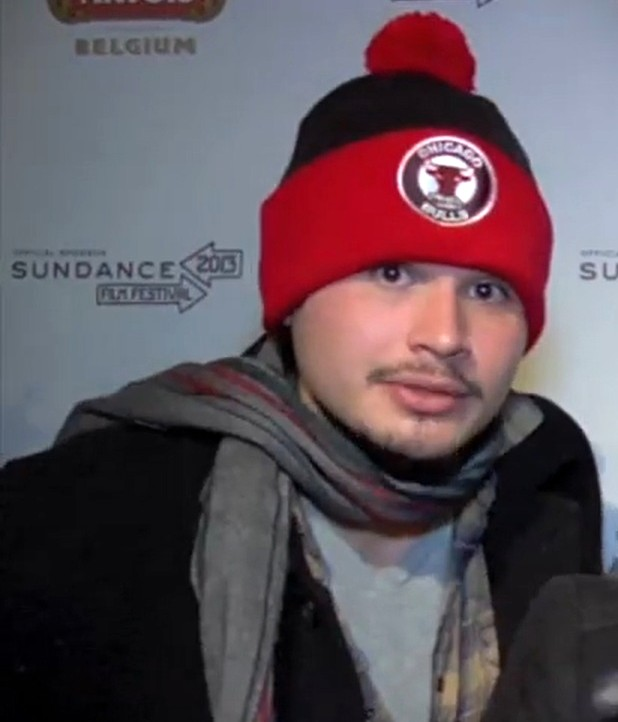
- Villareal in 2013
- Born: September 28, 1992 (age 34); Houston, Texas, United States
- Other name: Juan Villarreal Jr.
- Occupations: Actor; producer; assistant director

J. R. Villarreal (born September 28, 1992) is a American actor, producer, and second-line director, best known for his roles as Javier in the 2006 film Akeelah and the Bee, Black Scorpion on the Disney Channel action-comedy series Ultra Violet & Black Scorpion, and Azul on Paramount+ Yellowstone-spinoff series Dutton Ranch.

== Career ==
=== Early career: Akeelah and the Bee ===
Inspired by early-2000s teen sitcoms That's So Raven, Boy Meets World, Even Stevens, and Smart Guy, Villarreal began acting at 10 years old, appearing in network procedurals Without a Trace, Cold Case, and House, among others. In 2006, he received acclaim for his role as Javier Mendez, a talented 12-year-old Mexican-American contestant from upscale LA suburb Woodland Hills who competes in the Scripps National Spelling Bee alongside actress Keke Palmer in Akeelah and the Bee, eventually becoming her friend (and subsequent love interest) in the film after extending an invitation to both his birthday party and middle school spelling club.

=== 2007–2014: Transition to adult roles ===
In 2007, Villarreal appeared on procedural CSI: Miami before reuniting with Akeelah star Laurence Fishburne in the film adaptation of Don Winslow's 1997 novel The Death and Life of Bobby Z, appearing as the title character's son, Kit. In 2011, Villarreal starred in film Magic City Memoirs as Mikey Acosta, a star high school baseball prospect in his senior year trying to navigate amongst the pressures and temptations of Miami. The film premiered at the Miami International Film Festival, winning the Pursuit of Perfection Award, before later premiering on streaming service Netflix in 2015. In 2013, Villarreal appeared in independent horror-comedy Ghost Team One as Brad, a college-aged roommate in a house thought to be haunted.

=== 2015–2024: Sitcoms, Black Scorpion, Freeridge & Landman ===
While moving to behind-the-scenes roles as a producer on film projects such as An American in Texas and Scumbags, Villarreal recurred on multiple television series: High & Mighty, Netflix' Medal of Honor, and ABC family sitcom United We Fall, which lasted for one season.

In 2022, Villarreal was cast in the lead role as Black Scorpion / Cruz de la Vega on Disney Channel program Ultra Violet & Black Scorpion, a show recognized by critics for its meaningful celebration of cultural heritage and the customs of the Mexican American community. The show remained on the network for 16 episodes. He would next recur as comedic relief Tio Tonio on Netflix' short-lived On My Block spin-off Freeridge. Villarreal also appeared as Juan "Cinco" Lopez, the underworld-dealing second husband of Latin vocalist Jenni Rivera in Jenni, a 2024 biopic about Rivera's life.

In 2024, Villarreal received acclaim for his recurring arc as antagonist Manuel Lopez on Taylor Sheridan television drama Landman set in the Texas Oil fields.

=== 2025–present: Dutton Ranch ===
In October 2025, Villarreal was announced as series regular Azul in Sheridan Yellowstone spin-off series Dutton Ranch (which debuted in 2026 on streaming service Paramount+), and the series has since been renewed for a second season.

In 2026, Villarreal appeared as Chino in 2026 thriller film The Low-End Theory (renamed The Sweetest Kill) and will appear in an undisclosed role in sci-fi film Sky Valley.

== Filmography ==
=== Film ===
Key
| X | Denotes works that have not yet been released |

| Year | Title | Role | Notes |
|---|---|---|---|
| 2003 | Senor White | | |
| 2005 | Harvest of Redemption | Young Oscar | |
| 2006 | Akeelah and the Bee | Javier Mendez | |
| 2007 | The Death and Life of Bobby Z | Kit | |
| 2011 | Magic City Memoirs | Mikey Acosta | |
| 2013 | Ghost Team One | Brad | |
| 2015 | Spare Parts | Hector | |
| 2017 | An American in Texas | Paul Villarreal | Co-Producer |
| 2017 | Whiteblood | Rico | |
| 2022 | Scumbags | | Exec-Producer |
| 2023 | The Uncanny | Terrence | |
| 2024 | Jenni | Juan 'Cinco' Lopez | |
| 2026 | The Sweetest Kill | Chino | |
| Upcoming | Sky Valley | | Post-Production |

=== Television ===
| Year | Title | Role | Notes |
|---|---|---|---|
| 2003 | Without a Trace | Nelson Rodriguez | Episode: "A Tree Falls" |
| 2004 | Cold Case | Boy #2 | Episode: "The Plan" |
| 2005 | Strong Medicine | Marcos Garcia | Episode: "Promising Treatment" |
| 2005 | House | Manny | Episode: "Humpty Dumpty" |
| 2005 | Ghost Whisperer | Joseph Borgia | Episode: "On the Wings of a Dove" |
| 2007 | CSI: Miami | Ben Tavez | Episode: "No Man's Land" |
| 2013 | Chamacas | | Episode: "Bikini Line" |
| 2013 | The Bridge | Mando | Episode: "The Beast" |
| 2014 | Nights with Platanito | Himself | Guest Appearance (2 episodes) |
| 2017 | High & Mighty | Hugo | 7 episodes |
| 2018 | Medal of Honor | Justin Gallegos / Gallegos | 2 episodes |
| 2020 | United We Fall | Felix Rodriguez | 3 episodes |
| 2022 | Ultra Violet & Black Scorpion | Black Scorpion / Cruz de la Vega | 16 episodes |
| 2023 | Freeridge | Tio Tonio | 7 episodes |
| 2024 | Landman | Manuel Lopez | 4 episodes |
| 2026 | Dutton Ranch | Azul | 9 episodes |
