= Rob Letterman =

American film director

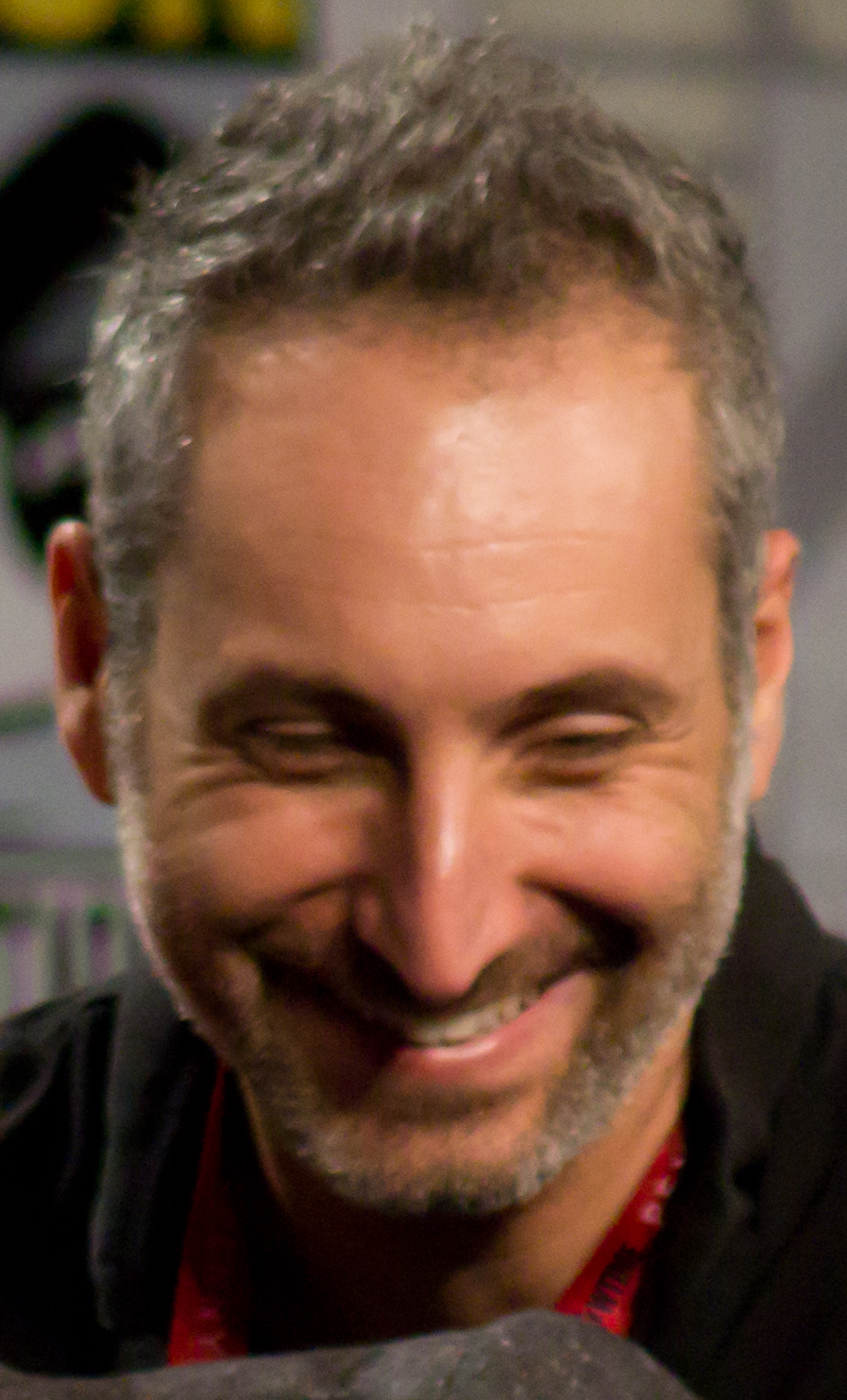
- Letterman at San Diego Comic-Con 2014
- Born: Robert Thomas Letterman; October 31, 1970 (age 56); Honolulu, Hawaii, U.S.
- Education: University of Southern California
- Occupations: Film director; screenwriter
- Years active: 1999–present
- Children: 2

Robert Thomas Letterman (born October 31, 1970) is an American film director and screenwriter. He made his directorial debut as co-director of the animated comedy film Shark Tale (2004), for which he received a nomination at the 32nd Annie Awards. He then co-directed the animated science fiction comedy film Monsters vs. Aliens (2009).

Letterman has since transitioned into live-action filmmaking, directing the fantasy comedy film Gulliver's Travels (2010), the horror comedy film Goosebumps (2015), and the fantasy mystery film Pokémon Detective Pikachu (2019).

== Early life ==
Letterman was born in Hawaii and attended Mid-Pacific Institute and USC.

== Career ==
Prior to joining DreamWorks Animation, Letterman directed the short film Los Gringos, which was accepted at 2000's Sundance Film Festival.

In 2002, Vicky Jenson and Eric "Bibo" Bergeron invited him as a screenwriter (then as co-director) in the making of Shark Tale. In 2010, Letterman directed the live-action film Gulliver's Travels, starring Jack Black in the lead role. He also directed the live-action/CGI film Pokémon Detective Pikachu, based on the Pokémon videogame franchise. The film was released on May 10, 2019, grossed $433 million at the box office, and attained the then-highest percentage of positive reviews on Rotten Tomatoes for a film adaptation of a video game.

In 2020, Netflix announced Letterman as director for an upcoming live-action animated film adaptation of Ubisoft's Beyond Good & Evil video game. No further updates have been given for the film since the announcement.

In 2026, Letterman was announced to direct and write a live-action/animated film adaptation of The Magic School Bus starring Elizabeth Banks as Ms. Frizzle.

== Personal life ==
Letterman is married to Beth Pontrelli and has two children.

== Filmography ==
Short film

Year	Title	Director	Producer	Writer	Notes
1996	Shrek – I Feel Good	No	Yes	No	Animation test
1999	Los Gringos	Yes	No	Yes	
2005	Club Oscar	Yes	No	No	

Feature film

Year	Title	Director	Writer	Notes
2004	Shark Tale	Yes	Yes	Co-directed with Vicky Jenson and Bibo Bergeron; Co-written with Michael J. Wilson
2009	Monsters vs. Aliens	Yes	Yes	Co-directed with Conrad Vernon; Screenplay co-written with Maya Forbes, Wallace Wolodarsky, Jonathan Aibel and Glenn Berger; Story co-written with Conrad Vernon
2010	Gulliver's Travels	Yes	No	
2015	Goosebumps	Yes	No	
2019	Detective Pikachu	Yes	Yes	Screenplay co-written with Dan Hernandez, Benji Samit and Derek Connolly

Television

Year	Title	Director	Writer	Executive producer	Creator	Notes
2023–2025	Goosebumps	Yes	Yes	Yes	Yes	Directed 4 episodes Written 4 episodes

Other credits

Year	Title	Role
1999	Lake Placid	Color and lighting supervisor: Digital Domain
2001	Shrek	Propellerhead: Los Angeles pre-production
2009	Monsters vs. Aliens	Also voiced Secret Service Man #1
2017	Captain Underpants: The First Epic Movie	Executive producer
