= Nicole Perlman =

American screenwriter (born 1981)

- Born: December 10, 1981 (age 44); Boulder, Colorado, U.S.
- Education: New York University
- Occupation: Screenwriter
- Years active: 2009–present

Nicole Perlman (born December 10, 1981) is an American screenwriter, best known for co-writing the Marvel Cinematic Universe film Guardians of the Galaxy (2014), and the story for Marvel's Captain Marvel (2019), and for Pokémon Detective Pikachu (2019).

== Early life ==
Perlman was born in Boulder, Colorado, the daughter of Penny and Michael Perlman, a physician. She was raised Jewish. She grew up in Boulder, where she attended Boulder High School. She studied film and dramatic writing at New York University's Tisch School of the Arts, where she graduated with a BFA in 2003. She won the Tribeca Film Festival's Sloan Grant for Science in Film for her screenplay Challenger.

== Career ==
She was enrolled in Marvel's screenwriting program in 2009, during which time she was offered several of their lesser-known properties on which to base a screenplay. Out of those, Perlman chose Dan Abnett and Andy Lanning's Guardians of the Galaxy, due to her interest in space and science fiction. "I can’t tell you what the other titles were that [Marvel] were offering up on the table, but I can tell you that one of them was a little bit more appropriate for me, just based on gender," she says. "I think they were a little taken aback when I chose Guardians, because there were ones that would make a lot more sense if you were a romantic-comedy writer or something like that." Perlman spent two years writing a draft, immersing herself in the Guardians universe. In late 2011, Perlman was asked to create another draft, and in early 2012, American writer and director James Gunn was brought in to contribute to the script, and direct the film. Gunn eventually rewrote the script entirely because "it didn't work" for him.

Perlman made her directorial debut in 2018 with The Slows, a short film which made its world premiere at Fantastic Fest and played at the New York Film Festival. It is adapted from a short story by Gail Hareven first published in The New Yorker. The film stars Annet Mahendru and Breeda Wool.

Perlman co-received a "story by" credit on Captain Marvel (2019).

She co-wrote an early script for the film Pokémon Detective Pikachu, with Gravity Falls creator Alex Hirsch. Eventually, she received a "story by" credit with Benji Samit and Dan Hernandez, while Hirsch was not credited.

In January 2016, Perlman announced that she is writing a sequel to Labyrinth alongside Fede Álvarez and Jay Basu. By October 2016, Warner Bros., Village Roadshow and Team Downey had put together a writers' room for the third of the Guy Ritchie Sherlock Holmes films, with Perlman, Justin Malen, Gary Whitta, Geneva Robertson-Dworet, and Kieran Fitzgerald included.

In 2018, Perlman has founded a production company, called Known Universe, together with Lindsey Beer and Geneva Robertson-Dworet. Known Universe has so far announced that it is going to help produce the new adaptation of William Golding's Lord of the Flies. It will also executive produce a Hello Kitty animation/live-action hybrid movie.

== Filmography ==
=== Films ===
Year	Title	Writer	Notes
2011	Thor	Consultant	Uncredited, contributed dialogue
2014	Guardians of the Galaxy	Yes	Co-writer with James Gunn
2019	Captain Marvel	Story	Story co-written with Meg LeFauve, Geneva Robertson-Dworet, Anna Boden and Ryan Fleck
2019	Pokémon Detective Pikachu	Story	Story co-written with Benji Samit and Dan Hernandez
2024	Godzilla x Kong: The New Empire	Story	Additional literary material credit along with Michael Dougherty, Zach Shields, James Ashcroft and Eli Kent
2025	KPop Demon Hunters	Production Consultant	Story consultant, contributed to character and story

=== Short films ===
Year	Title	Writer	Producer	Notes
2017	Raising a Rukus	Yes	Executive	
2018	The Slows	Yes	No	Also director

=== Films attached to with no release date ===
- Untitled Labyrinth sequel
- M.A.S.K.: Mobile Armored Strike Kommand
- Visionaries: Knights of the Magical Light
- Untitled Fast & Furious spin-off
