= Super Fun Night =

American sitcom

- Genre: Sitcom
- Created by: Rebel Wilson
- Starring: Rebel Wilson; Liza Lapira; Lauren Ash; Kate Jenkinson; Kevin Bishop
- Opening theme: "Don't Stop Me Now", performed by the cast
- Composers: Liz Phair; Evan Frankfort
- Country of origin: United States
- Original language: English
- No. of seasons: 1
- No. of episodes: 17

Production
- Executive producers: Conan O'Brien; Jeff Ross; John Riggi; David Kissinger; Rebel Wilson; Andrew Reich; Ted Cohen
- Producers: Steve Burgess; Peter Schindler
- Editors: Jamie Pedroza; Richie Edelson; Christian Hoffman
- Camera setup: Single-camera
- Running time: 22 minutes
- Production companies: Conaco; Bonanza Productions; Warner Bros. Television (episodes 1–17); ABC Studios (episodes 10–17)

Original release
- Network: ABC
- Release: October 2, 2013 – February 19, 2014

Super Fun Night is an American television sitcom that aired on ABC from October 2, 2013, to February 19, 2014. The series was broadcast during the 2013–14 television season on ABC in the Wednesday night 9:30 pm (ET/PT) slot after Modern Family. The series stars and was created by Rebel Wilson; it was green-lit by ABC for a series order pick-up on May 10, 2013. On May 9, 2014, ABC canceled the series after one season.

== Premise ==
For the past 13 years, three single women have set aside every Friday night as "Friday Fun Night". That is, until one of the women, Kimmie Boubier, decides it is time to take this party to the next level after befriending a fellow attorney.

== Cast and characters ==
=== Main ===
- Rebel Wilson as Kimberley "Kimmie" Boubier, a young attorney who is slightly childish, but when it comes down to it, she can be professional. She is in love with Richard, although for the first half of the season, he seems to just see her as a friend.
- Liza Lapira as Helen-Alice, Kimmie's OCD and germophobic actuary friend. She has trouble developing her relationship with Benji as she lacks confidence in her romantic endeavours.
- Lauren Ash as Marika, Kimmie's friend and a tennis instructor. She later comes out as a lesbian.
- Kate Jenkinson as Kendall Quinn, Kimmie's antagonistic co-worker who briefly dates Richard
- Kevin Bishop as Richard Royce, Kimmie's co-worker whom she has a crush on

=== Recurring ===
- Ashley Tisdale as Jazmine Boubier, Kimmie's sister
- Dan Ahdoot as Ruby, Kimmie, Marika and Helen-Alice's neighbor who lives with Dan and Benji
- John Gemberling as Dan, Kimmie, Marika and Helen-Alice's neighbor who lives with Ruby and Benji
- Paul Rust as Benji, Kimmie, Marika and Helen-Alice's neighbor who lives with Dan and Ruby
- Nate Torrence as James, Richard's friend and Kimmie's boyfriend
- Hana Mae Lee as Frankie, Marika's girlfriend
- Brando Marler as Danny, Kimmie's cousin
- Anastasia Pimenov as young Kimmie
- Matt Lucas as Derrick, Kimmie's co-worker
- Amy Vorpahl as Snarling Hannah, Kimmie's co-worker
- Darin Brooks as Jason, Jazmine's boyfriend

== Production ==
=== Development ===
Super Fun Night was originally planned for CBS as a possible pilot for the 2012–13 season. After the network passed on the project, Warner Bros. took it over to ABC. It became a fast track to greenlight status, resulting in the series receiving a pick-up for the 2013–14 season. The series original pilot was filmed in multi-camera but was changed by ABC to single-camera. The series premiered with the intended second episode instead of the pilot. This caused the Halloween episode to air over two weeks before Halloween. The pilot would later air as the eighth episode.

=== Casting ===
In the CBS pilot, the lead roles were to star Wilson, Jenny Slate, and Edi Patterson, but after ABC picked up the project, both Slate and Patterson were dropped from the cast, and the show was retooled, with Lauren Ash and Liza Lapira landing the co-leads. Other casting changes from the pilot include Jazmine Boubier (played by Deborah Baker Jr., later recast to Ashley Tisdale), Jason, Jazmine's boyfriend (played by Alan Ritchson, later recast to Darin Brooks), and Felicity Vanderstone, played by Kelen Coleman. In the case of Vanderstone, the character was recast and renamed Kendall Quinn (played by Kate Jenkinson).

== Episodes ==
No.	Title	Directed by	Written by	Original release date	Prod. code	U.S. viewers (millions)
1	"Anything for Love"	Alex Hardcastle	John Riggi	October 2, 2013	2J6952	8.23
Kimmie's eagerness to try new things flags.
2	"Three Men and a Boubier"	Jeffrey Walker	Brent Forrester	October 9, 2013	2J6953	6.64
Kimmie, Marika, and Helen-Alice try online dating. When they don't get matches, Kimmie secretly embellishes their profiles.
3	"Chick or Treat"	Stuart McDonald	Rebel Wilson	October 16, 2013	2J6955	5.95
Kimmie plans to make a move on Richard at the office Halloween party. Kendall gets there first.
4	"Engagement Party"	John Riggi	Robin Schiff	October 23, 2013	2J6956	5.79
Kimmie's mother (Jacki Weaver) arrives in town and takes over planning the engagement party of her sister Jazmine (Ashley Tisdale), giving it a luau theme with a bathing suit dress code.
5	"Go with Glorg"	Rodman Flender	Hannah Friedman	October 30, 2013	2J6958	5.17
Kimmie spends time with Quinn, while Marika and Helen-Alice visit an autograph session held by television action star Alison Lockridge (Brooke Shields).
6	"The Love Lioness"	Stuart McDonald	Jen Braeden	November 13, 2013	2J6957	5.84
Kimmie, Marika and Helen-Alice attend a seminar given by a relationship guru (played by Molly Shannon).
7	"The Set Up"	Ken Marino	Christina Lee & Michael Showalter	November 20, 2013	2J6960	5.52
Kimmie is on a blind date with one of Richard's nerdy friends, James, who instantly falls for her.
8	"Pilot"	John Riggi	Rebel Wilson	December 4, 2013	296838	4.77
Kimmie, a junior attorney, gets a big promotion at work. There she meets Richard, the son of the firm's senior partner, and is convinced that he is attracted to her. Kimmie starts to believe that life is starting to go her way, causing her friends Helen-Alice and Marika to worry that she may leave them behind.
9	"Merry Super Fun Christmas"	Christine Gernon	Steve Rubinshteyn	December 11, 2013	2J6959	5.37
Richard drives Kimmie, Marika, and Helen-Alice, to a cut-your-own Christmas tree lot. Kendall spends an evening with her discouraging and cold alcoholic parents (Mo Gaffney and Alan Ruck).
10	"Li'l Big Kim"	Eyal Gordin	Dan Hernandez & Benji Samit	January 8, 2014	2J6961	4.87
Kimmie befriends a rapper, "Miss T" who hates lawyers but takes a shine to Kimmie while the law firm tries to woo her to sign with the firm. "Miss T" invites Kimmie to join her as a VIP at a club performance and Kimmie is given the task of trying to get "Miss T" to sign with the firm even though nobody believes she can do it. Kendall tries to make Richard jealous with an old friend.
11	"Dinner Party"	Fred Savage	Jen Braeden	January 8, 2014	2J6962	4.68
Kimmie invites James over for a dinner party, which turns out horrible after the guys across the hall cater the event and Jazmine shows up drunk. Kendall brings Richard to a fancy party, saying it's a "fundraiser", which results in them getting into a fight.
12	"Hostile Makeover"	Elliott Hegarty	John Riggi	January 15, 2014	2J6963	4.44
Her breakup with Richard official, Kendall blames Kimmie and begins to torture her at work. Marika and Helen-Alice decide to update their looks.
13	"Let the Games Begin"	Jamie Babbit	Brent Forrester	January 22, 2014	2J6964	4.83
After losing her virginity to James and later getting in an argument with the girls, Kimmie blows off game night. Marika and Helen-Alice are surprisingly joined by Kendall, who has decided to chuck it all and take to boozing and pigging out.
14	"Lucindervention"	Stuart McDonald	Christina Lee & Michael Showalter	January 29, 2014	2J6965	3.82
Richard is visited by his manipulative ex-fiancee from back home, Lucinda. When he shows signs that he wants to rekindle their relationship, Kimmie and Kendall team up to convince Richard that Lucinda will only break his heart again. Elsewhere, Marika meets a woman at a gallery opening who seems to be interested in "more than friendship", while Helen-Alice asks Benji out after discovering that he wanted to ask her but was too shy.
15	"Cookie Prom"	Joe Nussbaum	Dan Hernandez & Ben Samit	February 5, 2014	2J6954	4.60
To commemorate their high school prom, the girls gather once a year to pig out on cookies, as they did on the original night after things went badly for all of them. But with Kimmie trying to be more mature at work, she questions whether they still need this pity party.
16	"Lesbihonest"	Ken Marino	Rebel Wilson	February 12, 2014	2J6966	3.42
At a party, Marika is hit on by Frankie, the woman she met at the gallery, who assumes she is gay. After Marika at first denies it, the two later kiss, and Marika is shocked by the realization that she likes women. Meanwhile, Kimmie is happy to finally have a date for Valentine's Day (James), but James gets called in to work the dinner rush at the restaurant which turns out to last longer than expected. Kimmie later gets confused when Richard drops clues that he may finally want to be more than friends.
17	"...Till the Fat Lady Sings"	Stuart McDonald	John Riggi	February 19, 2014	2J6967	2.67
Marika tells Kimmie and Helen-Alice about Frankie, first saying she's her tennis client, but later admitting Frankie is her girlfriend. To her bewilderment, Marika's friends do not act the least bit shocked even mentioning that they both long suspected that she was gay. Helen-Alice finally has sex with Benji, despite the fact that he is severely allergic to her. Kimmie, still processing what happened with Richard, tells James that she and Richard kissed, causing James to break up with her. Later, Richard accepts a promotion when his father visits town, but the job is in Berlin and Richard chooses to go. Kimmie rushes to the airport to tell Richard how she truly feels, but upon arriving she can only wish him luck. She returns to James and says she made a mistake and really wants to be with him.

== International broadcast ==
In Canada, City TV simulcasted the ABC broadcast. In Wilson's native Australia, the series premiered on the Nine Network on October 15, 2013. In the Philippines, it began airing on ETC starting October 8, 2013. In Latin America, the series premiered on October 14, 2013, and it aired on the Warner Channel. In Ireland, the show was broadcast beginning on March 10, 2014.

== Reception ==
=== Critical response ===
Super Fun Night received mixed-to-negative reviews. Review aggregator Rotten Tomatoes gives the series a score of 32% based on 44 reviews, with an average rating of 5.1/10 and the consensus reads: "Despite the presence of the funny and talented Rebel Wilson, Super Fun Night is overreliant on tired, clichéd weight jokes."

David Hinckley of The New York Daily News gave the show a 2 stars out of 5 and said that it was "not all that much fun". Brian Lowry of Variety gave the show a negative review, calling Wilson's American accent "uncomfortable" and the material "slight". Matt Webb Mitovich of TVLine lamented that the show had replaced Happy Endings, saying that even after watching Super Fun Night a second time to make sure he hadn't "missed" something, it still disappointed. A "live-action cartoon", he particularly disliked the lead characters. Verne Gay of Newsday gave the show a B− and called Rebel Wilson the show's "glimmer of hope". Robert Bianco of USA Today gave the show a 3 out of 4 stars. Tim Goodman of The Hollywood Reporter gave the show a negative review.

=== Awards and nominations ===
Year	Award	Category	Recipients and nominees	Outcome
2014	People's Choice Awards	Favorite New TV Comedy	Super Fun Night	Won
2014	People's Choice Awards	Favorite New TV Actress	Rebel Wilson	Nominated
2014	POPrepublic.tv Awards	Favorite International TV Show	Super Fun Night	Nominated
