= Scarlett Estevez =

American actress (born 2007)

- Born: Scarlett Madeline Estevez; December 4, 2007 (age 18); Los Angeles, California, U.S.
- Occupation: Actress
- Years active: 2013–present
- Relatives: Liza Weil (aunt)

External image
- Scarlett Estevez IMDb photo

Scarlett Madeline Estevez (born December 4, 2007) is an American actress. She began her career as a child actress playing Megan in the films Daddy's Home (2015) and its sequel Daddy's Home 2 (2017). Estevez went on to play Trixie on the television series Lucifer from 2016 to 2021, and Gwen on the fourth season of the Disney Channel television series Bunk'd in 2019. She starred as Violet Rodriguez / Ultra Violet in the Disney Channel series Ultra Violet & Black Scorpion in 2022.

== Early life ==
Estevez was born Scarlett Madeline Estevez on December 4, 2007 in Los Angeles, California to Anthony and Samantha (née Weil) Estevez. Estevez was three years old when she was booked for her first national commercial. She is the niece of actress Liza Weil through her mother Samantha.

== Career ==
Estevez's first film role was playing Ashley in the 2013 short film The Magic Bracelet, produced for the Make a Film Foundation. Later she appeared in the 2013 film And Then There Was You, and in the 2015 Nickelodeon television film The Massively Mixed-Up Middle School Mystery.

In 2015, she starred in Daddy's Home playing Megan, a role she reprised for the film's 2017 sequel Daddy's Home 2. The Hartford Courant noted of her appearance in Daddy's Home that "it has to be said that the child actors playing the kids, Megan (Scarlett Estevez) and Dylan (Owen Vaccaro) actually give real comic performances", and The Austin Chronicle review of Daddy's Home 2 singled out Estevez among the child actors in the film, noting that "while the children are mainly used as pawns in the larger power struggle, there are a couple of scenes in which Estevez has a chance to deliver some lines that are actually funny".

In March 2015, she was cast as Trixie Espinoza in the Fox television series Lucifer. She continued in the role after the show was canceled by FOX and picked up by Netflix. In 2019, she was also cast in the fourth season of the Disney Channel television comedy series Bunk'd, playing the role of Gwen, a character "who has spent her entire life living off the grid". In June 2020, it was confirmed that Lucifer would be renewed for a sixth and final season on Netflix, but Estevez appeared in a more limited capacity, as she was cast in January 2021 in the lead role of Violet Rodriguez / Ultra Violet in the Disney Channel series Ultra Violet & Black Scorpion. That series premiered on June 3, 2022. In February 2024, she was cast as a voice actor for the character "Kara" in the Nicktoons show The Loud House.

== Filmography ==
Film roles
Year	Title	Role	Notes
2013	And Then There Was You	Abigail	
2015	Daddy's Home	Megan Mayron	
2017	Daddy's Home 2	Megan Mayron	
2018	The Grinch	Izzy (voice)	
2026	Don't Say Good Luck	Carolyn Morales	
2027	Wings of Freedom	Leaf (voice)	Post-production
TBA	American Afterlife	Cielo	

Television roles
Year	Title	Role	Notes
2013	Redeeming Dave	Cute Girl	Episode: "Holy Sh*t"
2015	The Massively Mixed-Up Middle School Mystery	Young Elena Mendoza	Television film
2015–2021	If You Give a Mouse a Cookie	Esme Louise (voice)	Recurring role
2016–2021	Lucifer	Beatrice "Trixie" Espinoza	Main role (season 1–4); recurring role (season 5–6)
2019–2021, 2024	Bunk'd	Gwen Flores	Main role (season 4); guest (season 5 and 7)
2020	Raven's Home	Gwen Flores	Episode: "Raven About Bunk'd"
2021	Christmas...Again?!	Rowena Clybourne	Television film
2022	Ultra Violet & Black Scorpion	Violet Rodriguez / Ultra Violet	Main role
2023	Dew Drop Diaries	Eden Lily (voice)	Main role
2024–2026	The Loud House	Kara (voice)	Recurring role (season 7–9)
