= Christmas...Again?! =

2021 film directed by Andy Fickman

- Promotional poster
- Genre: Christmas; Family; Comedy
- Written by: Doan La
- Directed by: Andy Fickman
- Starring: Scarlett Estevez; Alexis Carra; Beth Lacke; Ashlyn Jade Lopez; Priscilla Lopez; Tony Amendola; Gabriel Ruiz; Sean Parris; Daniel Sunjata; Gary Anthony Williams
- Composer: Nathan Wang
- Country of origin: United States
- Original language: English

Production
- Executive producers: Andy Fickman; Betsy Sullenger
- Running time: 95 minutes
- Production companies: Oops Doughnuts Productions; Hop Skip Jump Productions; GWave Productions

Original release
- Network: Disney Channel
- Release: December 3, 2021

Christmas...Again?! is an American Christmas family comedy television film directed by Andy Fickman and written by Doan La. The film stars Scarlett Estevez, Alexis Carra, Beth Lacke, Ashlyn Jade Lopez, Priscilla Lopez, Tony Amendola, Gabriel Ruiz, Sean Parris, Daniel Sunjata, and Gary Anthony Williams. It premiered on December 3, 2021, on Disney Channel.

== Plot ==
Twelve year old Rowena Clybourne lives with her older sister Gabriella and divorced mother, and is about to celebrate her first Christmas since her parents were divorced with her father, his girlfriend Diane and her son Louie, uncles Gerry and Bruce, and grandparents coming over.

During Christmas, Louie scares her out of bed when he and her father arrive, and many things go wrong like Rowena's father playing catch with Louie while her uncle's dog Olive peed on her baseball glove, Uncle Bruce slips on used wrapping paper that she left on the ground while opening up presents and breaks his neck, and after Louie keeps turning off the TV to keep her from watching an Elves vs Santa's hockey game, she has an argument with her family and storms out.

While outside, she meets a tall Santa Claus and tells him she feels bad about how her Christmas is going and wishes to start over and he grants her wish and her mom doesn't believe her when she tells her Santa was there and she brings her back in to apologize. The next morning, Rowena realizes that her wish came true and the entire Christmas Day repeats itself.

She then starts to realize that Christmas keeps repeating itself everyday and she decides that she can do whatever she wants while the day keeps repeating itself. She orders a limo driven by Tall Santa to take her places and spends her days going sledding, going to a winter carnival, going to the Elves vs Santa hockey game and even plays one game dressed as a Santa. She also goes to a Christmas Exhibit at the museum, and many other things. She also gets back at Louie for scaring her out of bed, predicts all the presents that her family got for her and asks personal questions to her relatives and remembering everything they said the previous day.

One day, she meets Tall Santa at a hockey game and tells him about her reliving her favorite Christmas memories and tells him about her family changing and being too busy for her, and he tells her that they could still be together on Christmas, despite the changes and tells her to create new memories and realize that her parents will always love her, even while divorced and Rowena decides to get her parents back together.

Her parents tell her the story of their first Christmas and she decides to recreate their first Christmas together and she gets rid of some distractions like making Diane sneeze from cat fur from a local lost cat and making her sick, letting Olive loose and sending her uncles out to find her, and keeping Louie occupied with a laptop in the bathroom.

She then shuts the power off and leaves her parents alone sipping hot chocolate to recreate their first Christmas and giving them mistletoe for them to kiss and Rowena gets caught. She then clogs up their sink so her dad can fix it when her mom mentions that he's handy and puts makeup on her mom and Rowena and Gabriella play music and have a little dance party in the living room and Rowena plays their wedding song to make them slow dance and turns on the fan to blow in her mom's face and she gives them mistletoe again and they get caught again and Rowena gets upset that they're not falling in love again and Gabriella tells her that their dad is getting remarried and kept the news from Rowena to keep it from ruining her Christmas and Rowena says she misses how their family used to be, and her mom tells her that they still love her and they'll be even more people that love her too, but Rowena says she doesn't want that.

Rowena then starts to get tired of Christmas and keeps trying to destroy her alarm clock to cancel out the wish, only for it to reset itself every time and announces to her family that Christmas is overrated and she tries to tell Santa to end her wish. Gabriella confesses to her that she misses how their family used to be too and that their parents used to fight, and are much happier divorced. And Gabriella tells Rowena about her being born changing everything and Gabriella didn't like it, but she decided to give her a chance, and is happy that they're sisters and Rowena decides to give all the changes a chance.

Rowena then spends the next Christmases getting a Mariachi Band to perform for the family, learning Judo to fight a local bully stealing charity money from kids, keeping a marriage proposal from ending in disaster, collecting money for charity, reuniting the lost cat to its family, cleaning up used wrapping paper to keep Uncle Bruce from tripping on it and listens to Uncle Gerry telling jokes. Then everybody that Rowena helped came by food and to thank her for everything she's done for them and Rowena gives Gabriella a tablet that she spent her savings on. Rowena then thanks her family and tells them that Christmas is about spending time with family that you care about, rather than tradition and they all sing Christmas Carol's together. She later tells her mom what she learned from reading A Christmas Carol and tells her that she's no longer afraid of letting new people in and that she had a great Christmas, even if her mom won't remember it the next day.

The next day, Louie wakes her up and Rowena realizes that Christmas is finally over and she goes outside to say goodbye to her Dad, Diane, and Louie and Tall Santa arrives in his limo and shows her the naughty list (which he calls a Second Chance list) and her name disappears and the limo turns into a sleigh and takes off into the sky and Rowena says goodbye.

== Cast ==
- Scarlett Estevez as Rowena Clybourne
- Alexis Carra as Carolina, Rowena's divorced mother
- Beth Lacke as Diane, Mike's fiancée and Rowena's future stepmother
- Ashlyn Jade Lopez as Gabby Clybourne, Rowena's older sister
- Priscilla Lopez as Abuela Sofia, Rowena's maternal grandmother
- Tony Amendola as Abuelo Hector, Rowena's maternal grandfather
- Gabriel Ruiz as Gerry, Rowena's maternal uncle
- Sean Parris as Bruce, Rowena's maternal uncle
- Daniel Sunjata as Mike, Rowena's divorced father
- Gary Anthony Williams as Santa Claus
- James McCracken as Louie, Diane's son and Rowena's future younger stepbrother
- Alize Lee as Gretchen, a bully who keeps stealing money from charity
- Kenny Rasmussen as Wyatt, a boy who was trying to raise money for charity
- Layla Abdullah as Holly, a girl who was also trying to raise money for charity
- Charlie Farrell as Henry, Holly and Wyatt's single father and Carolina's new love interest
- Matt DeCaro as Mr. Brown

== Production ==
On November 10, 2020, it was announced that Disney Channel had begun production in Chicago on the Disney Channel Original Movie, Christmas...Again?!. Scarlett Estevez was cast in the lead role, with Daniel Sunjata, Alexis Carra, Priscilla Lopez, Ashlyn Jade Lopez, Beth Lacke, Tony Amendola and Gary Anthony Williams also rounding out the cast. Andy Fickman was set to direct the film, with Doan La serving as the writer. Fickman and Betsy Sullenger were set to executive produce the film.

On November 25, 2020, it was announced that Nathan Wang was set to compose the score for the film.

== Release ==
Christmas...Again?! premiered on December 3, 2021, on Disney Channel. The film was added to Disney+ on that same day.

== See also ==
- List of Christmas films
- List of films featuring time loops
- Santa Claus in film
