= Ultra Violet & Black Scorpion =

2022 American superhero comedy television series

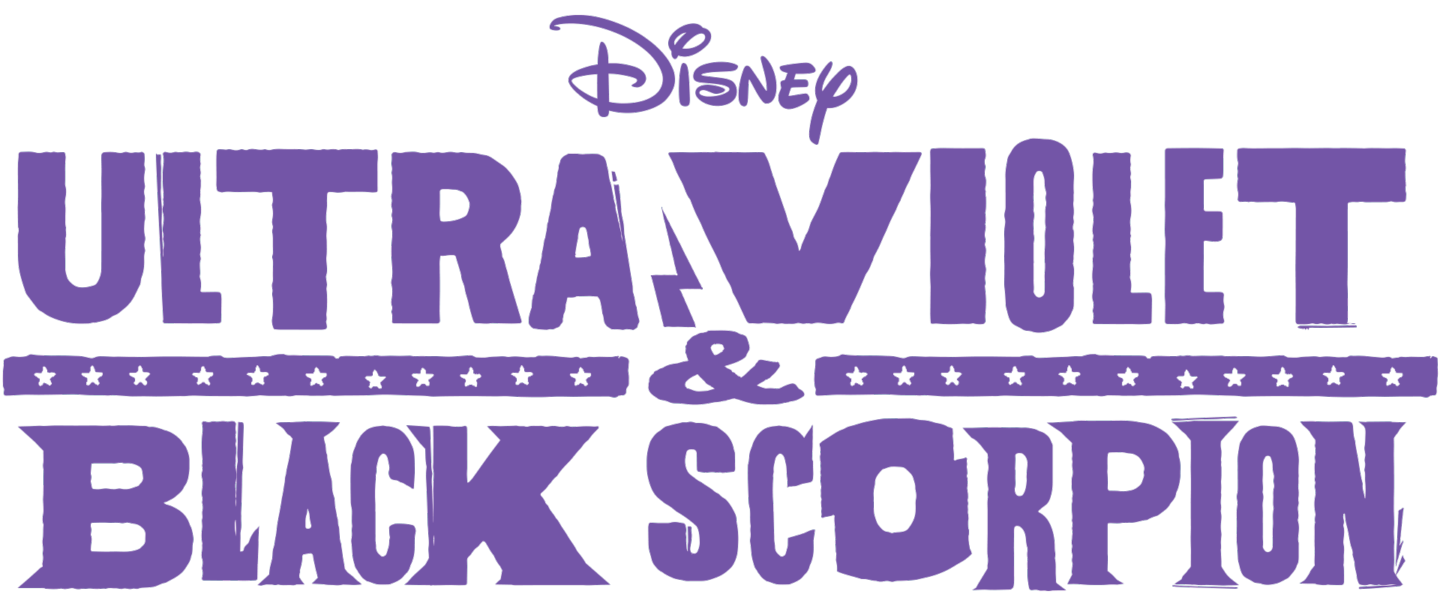
- Genre: Superhero; Coming-of-age; Action-comedy
- Created by: Dan Hernandez & Benji Samit
- Developed by: Leo Chu & Eric S. Garcia
- Starring: Scarlett Estevez; J. R. Villarreal; Marianna Burelli; Juan Alfonso; Brandon Rossel; Zelia Ankrum; Bryan Blanco
- Country of origin: United States
- Original language: English
- No. of seasons: 1
- No. of episodes: 16

Production
- Executive producers: Leo Chu & Eric S. Garcia; Joe Nussbaum; Dan Hernandez & Benji Samit
- Producers: Ray Lancon; Ian Watermeier
- Cinematography: Rafael Leyva
- Camera setup: Single-camera
- Running time: 22–25 minutes
- Production company: Gwave Productions

Original release
- Network: Disney Channel
- Release: June 3 – November 11, 2022

Ultra Violet & Black Scorpion is an American superhero coming-of-age action-comedy television series developed by Leo Chu and Eric S. Garcia and created by Dan Hernandez and Benji Samit that aired on Disney Channel from June 3 to November 11, 2022. The series stars Scarlett Estevez, J. R. Villarreal, Marianna Burelli, Juan Alfonso, Brandon Rossel, Zelia Ankrum, and Bryan Blanco.

== Plot ==
The series centers on 13-year-old Violet Rodriguez who is constantly overshadowed by her brother Santiago Rodriguez. One day, she is chosen by a magical Luchador mask to be its wearer. When she puts it on, Violet becomes a superhero that possesses super-speed. In need of a collaboration, she trails the Luchador superhero Black Scorpion and discovers that he is Violet's uncle Cruz. With both of them knowing each other's secrets, Cruz agrees to train Violet and have her follow in his footsteps.

== Cast ==
=== Main ===
- Scarlett Estevez as Violet Rodriguez / Ultra Violet, a 13-year-old girl who gets chosen by a magical Luchador mask that transforms her into a superhero with super-speed
- J. R. Villarreal as Cruz de la Vega / Black Scorpion, Violet's maternal uncle and superhero mentor who owns a wrestling gym and fights crime in secret where he possesses super-strength and the ability to teleport through shadows
- Marianna Burelli as Nina Rodriguez, Violet's mother and Cruz's sister who is the principal of Dolores Huerta Middle School
- Juan Alfonso as Juan Carlos Rodriguez, Violet's father who is a big lucha libre fan
- Brandon Rossel as Santiago "Tiago" Rodriguez, Violet's over-achieving elder brother
- Zelia Ankrum as Maya Miller-Martinez, Violet's best friend and confidante to whom Violet tells about the mask and secret identity
- Bryan Blanco as Luis León, an antisocial hall monitor at Dolores Huerta Middle School and a gossip blogger who wants to unmask Ultra Violet

=== Recurring ===
- Lorena Jorge as Catalina Rivera, a school counselor at Dolores Huerta Middle School and Cruz's love interest who is secretly the matter-phasing masked antihero known as Cascada

== Episodes ==
| No. | Title | Directed by | Written by | Original release date | Prod. code | U.S. viewers (millions) |
|---|---|---|---|---|---|---|
| 1 | "The Violet Behind the Ultra" | Adam Stein & Zach Lipovsky | Teleplay by : Leo Chu & Eric S. Garcia; Story by : Dan Hernandez & Benji Samit | June 3, 2022 | 101 | 0.27 |
Violet, a young girl who has been living in the shadow of her overachieving brother, finds a magical Luchador mask that transforms her into a superhero with super speed. She tells her best friend, Maya, about it and they start a channel to livestream her using her powers, under her "Ultra Violet" codename. To increase viewership, Violet reaches out to a superhero named Black Scorpion but he says that he wants to fight crime from the shadows. Violet follows him and when he takes off his mask, she is shocked to find that Black Scorpion is her uncle, Cruz, who runs a local gym. Cruz tells Violet that the mask chose her and he volunteers to be her superhero mentor and trainer. Violet wants to livestream them fighting crime and unmask herself for views. Cruz stops her from unmasking herself and warns her against being tempted by the mask. Absent: Bryan Blanco as Luis León
| 2 | "You Like Me! You Really Like Me!" | Alberto Belli | Ray Lancon | June 3, 2022 | 102 | 0.24 |
Violet and Cruz have a disagreement because, instead of training, Violet is impatient and wants online popularity. She and Maya come up with a plan for Maya to film her fighting crime and then hold an Ultra Violet meet-and-greet for her fans. However, when she miscalculates the situation during the fight and ends up being rescued by Black Scorpion, Violet is embarrassed and throws away the mask. The next day, Ultra Violet's fans are disappointed when Violet fails to show up at the meet-and-greet. One of them asks Violet and Maya to help find her little girl. After searching for the girl with no success, the mask comes back and Violet puts it back on. She uses the super speed to easily find and reunite the girl with her mother. Realizing that helping people is more fulfilling than internet popularity, Violet agrees to let Cruz train her. Absent: Bryan Blanco as Luis León
| 3 | "Lucha Royale" | Nancy Hower | Stephen Reyes | June 10, 2022 (Note: This episode was first released on Disney+ on June 8, 2022.) | 103 | 0.21 |
The Rodriguez family attends a wrestling match to celebrate Nina's promotion to principal. Violet invites Uncle Cruz. Despite the family's doubts, he comes to the match. On arrival, Cruz is ambushed by someone in a fake Snow Leopard costume. Violet rescues him and they discover that the attacker is part of a Rudos group trying to steal the prize money from the ring. Violet is torn between spending time with her family and fighting crime. Black Scorpion goes into the ring to stop them. When the Rudos overpower him, Ultra Violet jumps into the ring to help him. To make up for missing a family jumbotron photo, Violet and Cruz convince their favorite wrestler Gigante to take a photo with the whole family. Meanwhile, Tiago flirts with a girl. When he finds out she is a Rudo and confronts her, she kicks him and leaves. Guest star: Armando L. Leduc as Al Dorado Absent: Zelia Ankrum as Maya Miller-Martinez, Bryan Blanco as Luis León
| 4 | "Sleepover Showdown" | Nancy Hower | Desirée Proctor & Erica Harrell | June 17, 2022 | 104 | N/A |
Maya gets Violet invited to a sleepover at Evita's house. Before the sleepover, Ultra Violet and Black Scorpion try to stop Miradora, a thief with electrokinesis, from stealing a device used for stealing money from banks. Miradora escapes but drops the device's verification key, which Violet grabs and turns into a necklace. At the sleepover, Violet gets upset after discovering that Evita only invited her because Maya asked her to. She becomes insecure and tries to impress the other girls which leads to a fight between her and Maya. Miradora comes to get the key from Violet, but Black Scorpion stops her from getting into Evita's house. After making up with Maya, Ultra Violet goes outside to help Black Scorpion defeat Miradora using the sprinklers while Maya distracts the other girls. Meanwhile, Nina becomes irrationally worried about Violet spending the night away from home for the first time. Guest star: Bevin Bru as Miradora
| 5 | "The Legend of the Twelve Masks" | Joe Lynch | Nelson Soler | June 24, 2022 | 105 | 0.13 |
Violet fails to make the volleyball team, adding to her long list of failures and being compared to her overachieving brother Tiago. After running into Duplico, another masked vigilante with duplication abilities, Violet learns from Cruz that there are twelve masks in total. She convinces herself that Tiago must have a mask too since he excels at everything. She searches his room and after finding a mask and costume sketches, she forces him to put it on but it turns out to be a regular mask. Tiago shows her his sketches and opens up about his interest in fashion, but Violet becomes jealous that he is better than her in fashion. She later apologizes and Tiago helps her practice volleyball. Meanwhile, Nina tries to use her power as the principal to get Coach Park to put Violet in the team. She gives up after it turns into a chain of favors and bribes. Guest stars: Jaylen Moore as Duplico, Jinny Chung as Coach Evelyn Park
| 6 | "¡Chisme! ¡Chisme! Read All About It!" | Joe Lynch | Zoe Kanters & Daniel Weingarten | July 1, 2022 | 106 | 0.22 |
A gossip blogger in Violet's school starts exposing people's secrets. When Violet, Maya, and their friends become victims of the blogger, Violet becomes determined to end it. During a surveillance session, Ultra Violet asks Black Scorpion for a password cracker device to help figure out the gossip blogger. He refuses because blogging is not a crime. She steals the device anyway and reviews the school security footage with Maya where they narrow their list of suspects to two. When the next post exposes Violet's mother for secretly getting kicked out of Teacher Tuesdays by the other teachers, they realize that their suspects couldn't have known that. They later figure out that the blogger is the hall monitor Luis whom everyone ignores. Ultra Violet visits Luis and forces him to stop blogging. A disappointed Luis joins the school newspaper and vows to unmask Ultra Violet.
| 7 | "Ultra Matchmaker" | Leslie Kolins Small | Lisa Kyonga Parsons | July 8, 2022 | 107 | 0.14 |
Ultra Violet and Black Scorpion save a woman who turns out to be Cruz's ex-girlfriend Lily. After learning from her family that Cruz was heartbroken over losing Lily, Violet decides to help her uncle find love again. Since Cruz is always cranky, Violet wants to set him up with the grumpy Coach Park. So she convinces Nina to hire Cruz as the substitute gym teacher to make it easier for Violet to play matchmaker. While every attempt to set him up with Coach Park fails, Cruz is approached by the school counselor Catalina Rivera and they easily connect. However, their blossoming romance is almost ruined when Violet unknowingly sends flowers to Coach Park on Cruz's behalf. Violet explains the mix-up to Catalina who agrees to give Cruz another chance. Meanwhile, Maya develops a crush on a boy named Alex who turns out to be gay. Guest stars: Lorena Jorge as Catalina Rivera, Jinny Chung as Coach Evelyn Park Absent: Bryan Blanco as Luis León
| 8 | "Ultra Violet Unmasked" | Leslie Kolins Small | Desirée Proctor & Erica Harrell | July 15, 2022 | 108 | 0.13 |
Luis catches Ultra Violet on camera taking her mask off and announces at school that he would unmask her the following day after his computer fixes the blurry photo. To destroy the photo, Violet and Maya visit Luis' house and while Maya works on it, Violet distracts Luis by playing with him. Luis opens up to Violet about his loneliness and they bond over shared love for wrestling. With the photo destroyed, Luis is humiliated as a liar. Feeling bad for him, Ultra Violet reaches out to Luis to help him see that she is a good person who helps people. She also gives him super speed rides, which he enjoys. However, the next day, Luis wears a cast to school, claiming that Ultra Violet is a menace who hurt him. He vows to never rest until he reveals her real identity. Meanwhile, Cruz goes on a date with Catalina and is forced to leave in the middle to stop a bank robbery. Guest star: Lorena Jorge as Catalina Rivera
| 9 | "Cascada" | Joe Nussbaum | Ray Lancon | July 22, 2022 | 109 | 0.19 |
Ultra Violet and Black Scorpion run into another masked vigilante known as Cascada who has the ability to phase through solid. Cascada helps a thief escape and says that it is okay to break the rules to help those in need. Despite Cruz's disapproval, Violet is impressed by Cascada's rebellious nature. Maya asks Ultra Violet to appear at a fundraiser to help increase turnout but Cruz forbids her from using her superhero status as a celebrity. Inspired by Cascada, Violet defies Cruz's rules and sneaks out of a competitive family dinner with their pretentious cousins to attend Maya's fundraiser event where she helps raise a lot of money. Seeing how much good she did by defying Cruz and lying to her family, Violet becomes conflicted about choosing between right and wrong. Later with no one looking, Cascada takes off her mask, revealing that she is Catalina. Guest stars: Lorena Jorge as Catalina Rivera, David Delao as Pablo Absent: Bryan Blanco as Luis León
| 10 | "Lucha Rules!" | Joe Nussbaum | Desirée Proctor & Erica Harrell | July 29, 2022 | 110 | 0.10 |
Impatient with Black Scorpion's training, Ultra Violet starts secretly training with Cascada who allows her to stay up late and take risks. When Cascada offers to let her stop a criminal by herself, Violet lies to get out of teaming up with Black Scorpion but they all run into each other at the crime scene. Cruz is disappointed with Violet for despising his warning that Cascada is dangerous. Following Cascada's advice, Violet tries to stop the criminal alone but gets hurt. Black Scorpion teams up with Cascada to stop the criminal before taking Violet home. After getting better, Violet apologizes and Cruz promises to stop being overprotective. Meanwhile, while visiting Cruz's gym, Tiago helps the dispirited fighter Anónimo find his confidence by designing a new costume that truly expresses his identity, leading him to his first victory. Back at home, Tiago starts to become suspicious when Violet lies that she was at the gym. Guest stars: Lorena Jorge as Catalina Rivera, Jesse Gallegos as Anónimo Absent: Bryan Blanco as Luis León
| 11 | "Ultra Friend, Ultra Flake" | Daniella Eisman | Zoe Kanters & Daniel Weingarten | October 7, 2022 | 111 | 0.10 |
Both Violet and Cruz struggle with their relationships with Maya and Catalina, respectively, due to their busy superhero lives. When Maya gets accepted into an esports tournament, Violet promises to help her practice but misses it while trying to stop prisoners from escaping. Violet apologizes but when she misses the actual tournament as well, Maya becomes upset that Violet chooses being a superhero over their friendship. Maya asks Violet for space. Cruz sets up a two month anniversary dinner with Catalina, but she cancels on him at the last minute because she is also secretly moonlighting as the vigilante, Cascada. As Cruz and Violet reflect on their lost relationships, Cruz explains that balancing relationships and saving the city is one of the challenges of being superheroes. Meanwhile, Tiago continues to suspect that Violet is hiding something. Guest star: Lorena Jorge as Catalina Rivera / Cascada
| 12 | "Forgive Me Not" | Daniella Eisman | Ray Lancon | October 14, 2022 (Note: This episode was first released on Disney+ on October 12, 2022.) | 112 | N/A |
Following their fight, Violet tries to win Maya back but Maya asks for space. After learning from Cruz that Violet and Maya had a fallout, Tiago checks in on her and advises her to give Maya time to remember their friendship. However, Violet tricks Maya into hanging out with her by asking their teacher to pair them together for an assignment. Realizing that Violet is using the project to win her back, Maya switches partners with Luis. Ultra Violet goes to Cascada for advice but accidentally injures Cascada's hand. Their talk helps Catalina decide to give Cruz another chance. While working with Luis, Violet realizes that she has been acting like him by refusing to respect Maya's boundaries. She gives Maya space, and eventually, Maya comes around and forgives her. Later, when Violet notices Catalina's hand with the same injury as Cascada's, she figures out that Catalina is Cascada. Guest star: Lorena Jorge as Catalina Rivera / Cascada
| 13 | "Highkey Anxiety" | Nimisha Mukerji | Stephen Reyes | October 21, 2022 | 113 | N/A |
After learning that Catalina is Cascada, Violet starts suffering from anxiety and having nightmares due to the pressure of keeping the secret. In the first nightmare, Black Scorpion unmasks Cascada as Catalina on public television because Violet refused to tell him in advance. When Tiago runs away from home, causing the family to fall apart, Violet's parents blame her for it. In the second nightmare, when Cruz tells Violet that he and Catalina are engaged, Violet asks Catalina to tell him that she is Cascada. Cruz overhears the conversation and blames Violet for keeping the secret from him. Cascada gets revenge by going after Violet's family and threatening to unmask her. In the third nightmare, Violet is trapped in the ring where she is being controlled by Luis who eventually unmasks her, putting her family in danger. After the nightmares, Violet decides to tell Cruz about Catalina. Guest stars: Lorena Jorge as Catalina Rivera / Cascada
| 14 | "Luis León Won't Go Home" | Nimisha Mukerji | Zoe Kanters & Daniel Weingarten | October 28, 2022 | 114 | N/A |
Luis tells Violet and Maya that he is close to unmasking Ultra Violet by using her social media posts to pinpoint where she lives. So, when Luis comes to her house, Violet becomes paranoid that he is digging for clues to confirm she is Ultra Violet. Despite Violet's subtle attempts, Luis refuses to leave and starts bonding with her parents and Tiago. Unable to take it anymore, she says out loud that she does not want Luis in their house, forcing him to leave. Nina and Juan help Violet understand that Luis wanted to stay because he is not lucky to have a family like she does. Violet apologizes to Luis and invites him back. Meanwhile, Cruz worries that Catalina might have the bad traits he hates about Cascada. After seeing Cascada help a thief in need by giving him money, he starts to understand her. However, they break up after disagreeing over whether being in need justifies stealing. Guest star: Lorena Jorge as Catalina Rivera / Cascada
| 15 | "Unleash the Cape" "Cape Night" | Marvin Lemus | Leo Chu & Eric S. Garcia | November 4, 2022 | 115 | 0.18 |
Black Scorpion starts wearing a cape but Violet mocks it as embarrassing. The cape becomes a liability when it gets caught, causing them to fall during a fight. While confronting Cruz about the cape, Violet accidentally tears it apart. An upset Cruz tells her that while the cape might seem silly to her, it is important to him because he used to wear one when he was a wrestler before the mask complicated everything. He opens up, saying that he needed to feel that way again following his break up with Catalina. After this, Violet gets him a new, better cape and gets herself one as well. Meanwhile, the city becomes divided about whether superheroes should wear capes. At first, Luis is against capes but switches sides after Tiago designs one for him. Elsewhere, Nina unsuccessfully tries to get both Cruz and Catalina to open up to her about their break up. Guest star: Lorena Jorge as Catalina Rivera / Cascada
| 16 | "Ultra Violet vs. Black Scorpion" | Joe Nussbaum | Nelson Soler & Lisa Kyonga Parsons and Sandra Hamada & Nathan Frizzell & Timothy K. Papciak | November 11, 2022 | 116 | N/A |
When Black Scorpion is caught on camera stealing equipment, Violet confronts Cruz about it but he does not remember. Going undercover, Violet and Maya discover that Black Scorpion is being mind-controlled by a masked villain called Hypnotico who intends to use the stolen equipment to control the entire city. Unable to stop him alone, Violet enlists Duplico and Cascada's help but Black Scorpion defeats them. Left with no choice, Violet helps Cruz break free by unmasking herself and reminding him that he is her uncle. As a result, Cascada learns Ultra Violet and Black Scorpion's identities. Free from his control, Black Scorpion easily defeats Hypnotico. Meanwhile, with encouragement from Violet, Tiago tells his parents that he wants to become a fashion designer. Nina is against it but Juan convinces her to let him pursue his passion. Later, Tiago finds Ultra Violet's mask in Violet's closet and asks her to put it on. Guest stars: Lorena Jorge as Catalina Rivera / Cascada, Jonathan Medina as Hypnotico, Jaylen Moore as Duplico

== Production ==
On January 21, 2020, Disney Channel gave Ultra Violet & Blue Demon a cast-contingent pilot order. Dan Hernandez and Benji Samit serve as executive producers. Blue Demon Jr. was also set to be an executive producer. Dan Hernandez and Benji Samit serve as writers.

On March 11, 2020, it was announced that Juan Alfonso joined the series. Marianna Burelli, Brandon Rossel, Zelia Ankrum, and Bryan Blanco were also announced to star in the series. The first episode was set to be directed by Alejandro Damiani.

On August 2, 2021, it was announced that J. R. Villarreal had joined the series, now titled Ultra Violet & Black Scorpion. Eric Garcia and Leo Chu serve as showrunners and additional executive producers. Blue Demon Jr. no longer has any involvement with the series. The series is filmed using single-camera. It was filmed in New Orleans.

On April 28, 2022, it was announced that the series would premiere on June 3, 2022. The first ten episodes were released on Disney+ on June 8, 2022. On November 18, 2022, it was reported that the series was canceled after one season.

== Reception ==
=== Critical response ===
Alex Reif of Laughing Place wrote, "Ultra Violet & Black Scorpion has a lot of fun with a premise that has proved popular recently with shows like Miraculous: Tales of Ladybug and Cat Noir. At its core, it's a Disney Channel comedy, but it has a lot to say about remaining true to yourself and celebrating your cultural heritage. There's a meaningful and relatable message for all viewers, but particularly those in the Mexican American community." Thomas West of Screen Rant stated that Ultra Violet & Black Scorpion "manages to set itself apart from many of the other superhero series that have occupied so much of the popular culture sphere."

Diondra Brown of Common Sense Media gave Ultra Violet & Black Scorpion a grade of three out of five stars, complimented the depiction of positive messages and role models, citing the dynamic between the characters of Violet and Black Scorpion, and took notice of the diverse representations across the characters, while calling the series a "funny action show." Andrew McGrotty of MovieWeb included in their "Best TV Series Coming to Disney+ in October 2022" list, asserting, "The series has been a hit with viewers."

=== Ratings ===
Viewership and ratings per season of Ultra Violet & Black Scorpion
| Season | Episodes | First aired | | Last aired | | Avg. viewers (millions) |
| Season | Episodes | Date | Viewers (millions) | Date | Viewers (millions) | Avg. viewers (millions) |
|---|---|---|---|---|---|---|
| 1 | 11 | June 3, 2022 | 0.27 | November 11, 2022 | TBD | 0.17 |

=== Accolades ===
| Year | Award | Category | Nominee(s) | Result | Ref. |
|---|---|---|---|---|---|
| 2023 | Imagen Foundation Awards | Best Youth Programming | Ultra Violet & Black Scorpion | Nominated | |
| 2023 | Children's & Family Emmy Awards | Outstanding Casting for a Live Action Program | Ultra Violet & Black Scorpion | Nominated | |
| 2023 | Children's & Family Emmy Awards | Outstanding Stunt Coordination for a Live Action Program | Ultra Violet & Black Scorpion | Nominated | |
| 2024 | Kidscreen Awards | Kids Programming – Best Inclusivity | Ultra Violet & Black Scorpion | Won | |
