= Los Gringos =

- Directed by: Rob Letterman
- Story by: Anders J. L. Beer; Rob Letterman
- Produced by: Brian Brenton
- Starring: Pat Morita; Charles Napier
- Narrated by: John Leader
- Edited by: John Coniglio
- Music by: Michael Giacchino
- Distributed by: Bonk Pictures
- Release date: 1999
- Running time: 6 minutes
- Country: United States
- Language: English

Los Gringos is a 1999 animated short film created and written by Anders J. L. Beer & Rob Letterman, the latter of whom also directed the short. It was an official selection for the 2000 Sundance Film Festival.

== Cast ==
- John Leader as Narrator
- Pat Morita as Samurai
- Charles Napier as Gringo Cowboy
