= Dan Hernandez and Benji Samit =

American film-making duo

Dan Hernandez
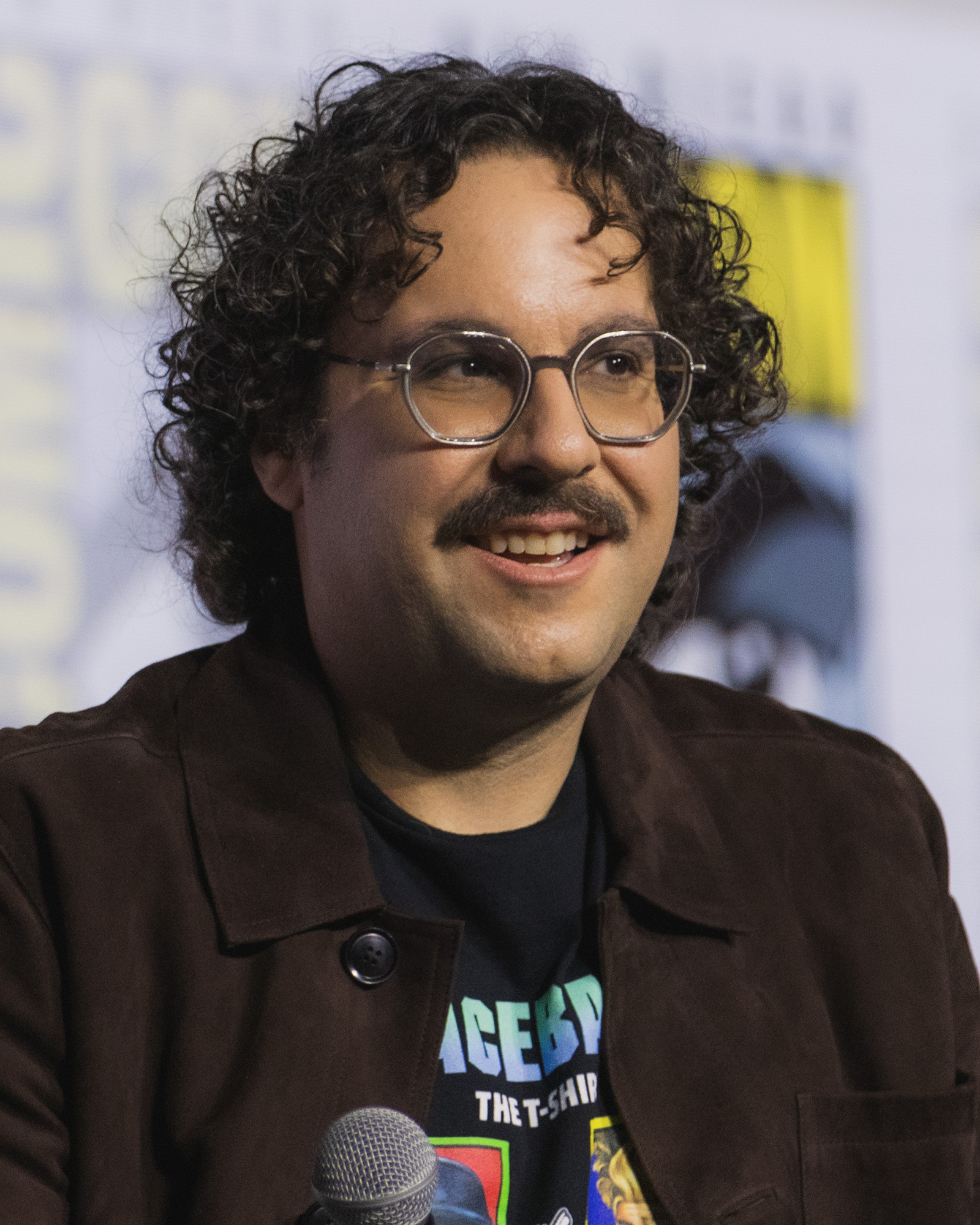
- Hernandez in 2026
- Born: Daniel Jacob Hernandez; November 20, 1983 (age 42); Fort Lauderdale, Florida, U.S.
- Education: Brown University
- Occupations: Film and television writer; producer
- Years active: 2013–present

Benji Samit
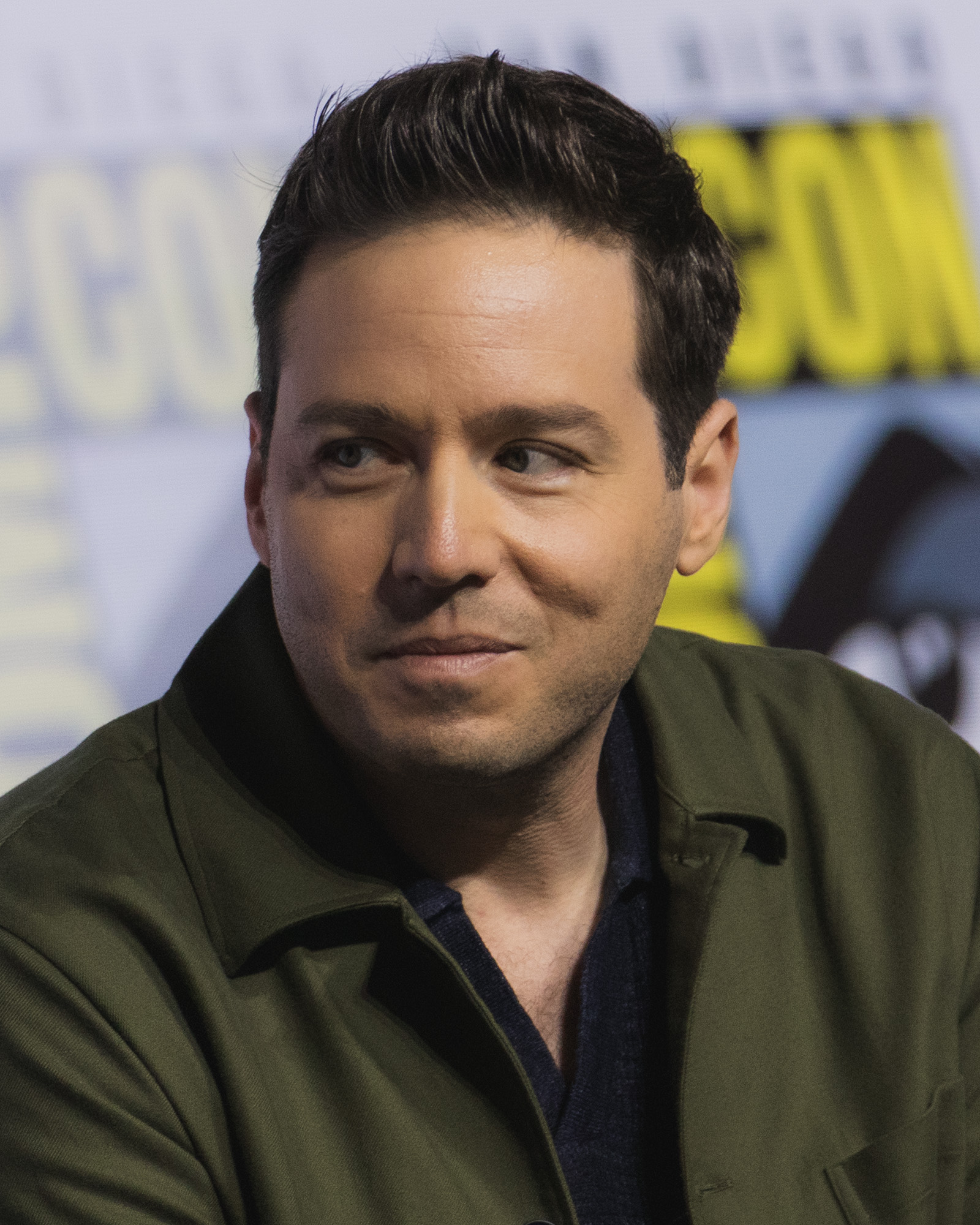
- Samit in 2026
- Born: Benjamin Adam Samit; July 21, 1984 (age 42); Los Angeles, California, U.S.
- Education: Brown University
- Occupations: Film and television writer; producer
- Years active: 2013–present

Daniel Jacob Hernandez (born November 20, 1983) and Benjamin Adam Samit (born July 21, 1984) are an American film and television writer and producer duo. They are most notable for writing Pokémon Detective Pikachu, which they co-wrote with Rob Letterman, Derek Connolly, and Nicole Perlman.

On television, Hernandez and Samit have written for One Day at a Time, The Tick, Super Fun Night, and 1600 Penn. They were named in Paste Magazine's list of the top 28 comedy writers of 2018. In 2019, Samit and Hernandez signed a long-term deal with 20th Television to develop, write, and produce animated and live-action series.

The two first met during their junior year at Brown University.

== Filmography ==
=== Film ===
Year	Title	Writer(s)	Producer(s)
2019	Pokémon Detective Pikachu	Yes	No
2021	The Addams Family 2	Yes	No
2023	Teenage Mutant Ninja Turtles: Mutant Mayhem	Yes	No
2027	Spaceballs: The New One	Yes	Yes

=== Television ===
Year(s)	Title	Credit(s)
2012-2013	1600 Penn	Staff writer, written by
2014	Super Fun Night	Story editor, written by
2017-2020	One Day at a Time	Co-executive producer, supervising producer, producer, written by
2016-2019	The Tick	Consulting producer, written by
2020	The George Lucas Talk Show	May the AR Be LI$$ You (Arli$$ marathon fundraiser); The George Lucas Holiday Special
2020-2022	Central Park	Consulting producer, written by
2022	Ultra Violet & Black Scorpion	Creator, executive producer
2023	Koala Man	Developed by, executive producer, written by
2024-2025	Lego Star Wars: Rebuild the Galaxy	Developed by, executive producer, written by

== Selected Accolades ==
Year	Award	Nominated Work	Result
2024	Annie Award for Outstanding Achievement for Writing in a Feature Production	Teenage Mutant Ninja Turtles: Mutant Mayhem	Nominated
2026	Producers Guild of America Award for Outstanding Children's Program	Lego Star Wars: Rebuild the Galaxy - Pieces of the Past	Nominated
