= Fernanda Romero =

Mexican actress, model and singer (born 1983)

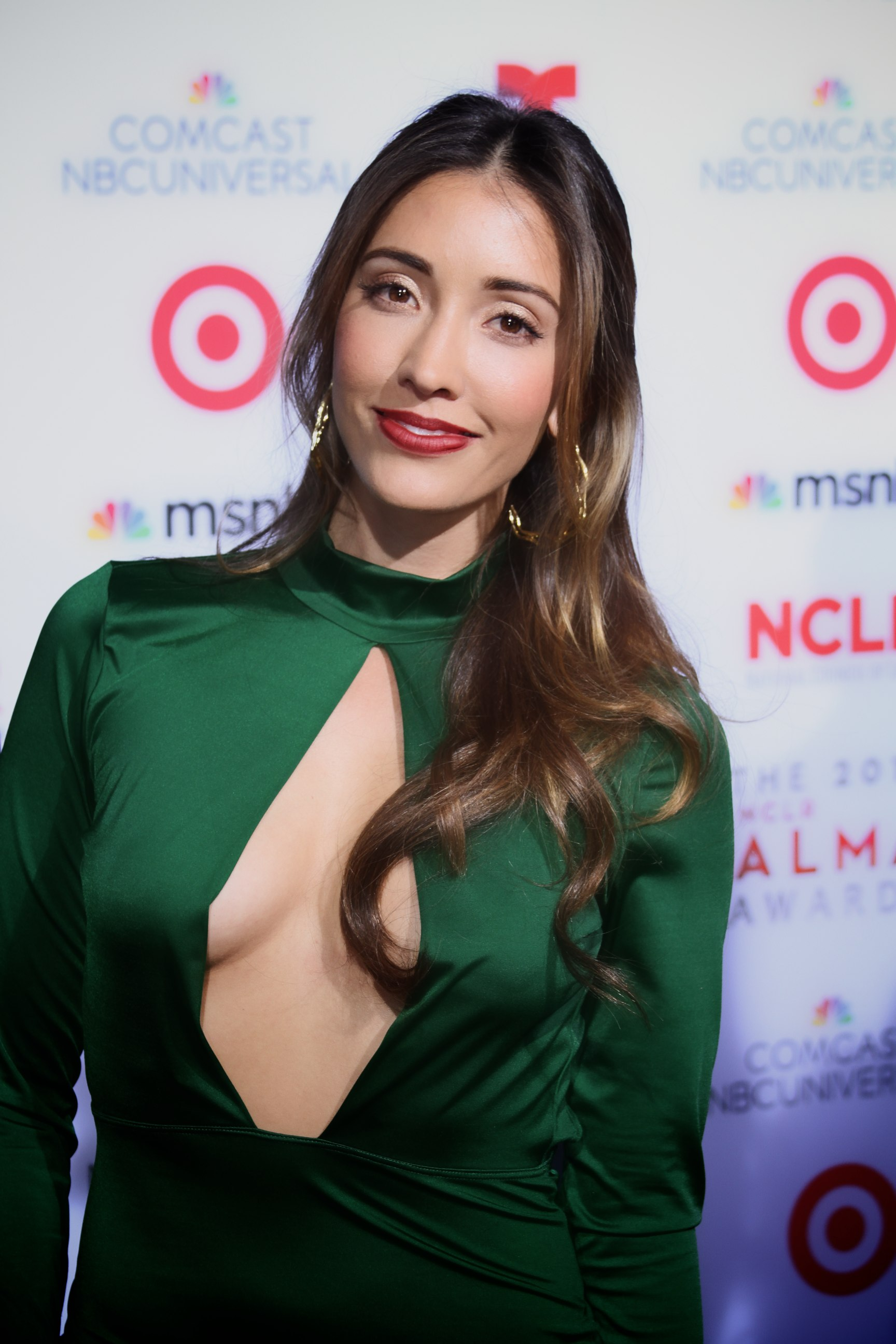
- Romero at the 2013 Alma Awards
- Born: María Fernanda Romero Martínez; October 4, 1983 (age 42); Mexico City, Distrito Federal, Mexico
- Occupations: Actress; model; singer

Fernanda Romero (born as María Fernanda Romero Martínez on October 4, 1983) is a Mexican actress, model and singer. She is most noted for her starring role in the Mexican telenovela Eternamente tuya and her supporting role in the American film The Eye.

== Biography ==
Romero began her singing career when she joined BMG's recording ensemble group, Frizzby, who began touring Central America to promote their two top ten singles. They performed for Pope John Paul II at the famous Estadio Azteca in Mexico City.

By the time Romero reached eighteen she was in ad campaigns for brands like Rock and Republic, Clean & Clear, Pepsi, Apple, and J.C. Penney. She also appeared in magazines such as GQ Mexico, OK Magazine Espanol, Reforma and ELLE Mexico.

Romero began her acting career as host of the Univision television show Control, followed shortly by an appearance on the Telemundo telenovela La Ley del Silencio. These led to her first film offer, a role in the film Creature of Darkness, and several more small roles.

Romero's breakout role occurred in the film The Eye. This exposure to American audiences led to more Hollywood films, including The Burning Plain, Drag Me to Hell and Red Canvas.

In 2009, Fernanda Romero returned to Mexico to star in the soap opera Eternamente tuya.

== Immigration issues ==
In 2010, Romero was arrested on charges of immigration fraud, accused of entering into a sham marriage to obtain legal immigrant status in the United States. She and her husband, a musician, were arrested in their separate homes, and put on trial, where she was accused of paying her groom $5000 for the marriage. She wasn't found guilty by a jury, but reached a deal and pleaded guilty to a lesser count, and was ordered to serve 30 days in jail. Although such a conviction is generally followed by deportation, as of June 2012, the United States Immigration and Naturalization Service had not taken any action to deport Romero.

== Filmography ==
=== Film ===
Year	Title	Role	Notes
2005	Pit Fighter	Conchita	
2006	Alex & Rita	Rita	Short
2007	Carts	Maria	
2008	The Eye	Ana Cristina Martínez	
2008	The Burning Plain	Sophie	
2009	Creature of Darkness	Heather	
2009	2 Dudes and a Dream	Opening Hot Girl	
2009	Drag Me to Hell	Female Mortgage Customer	
2009	April Showers	Sylvia	
2009	Ready or Not	Puri	
2009	Love: Quit or Die	Giovana	Short
2010	Once Fallen	Willow	
2010	Kill Katie Malone	Misty	
2010	Standing 8	Gloria	Short
2010	Las Angeles	Maria	
2011	Sold	Maya	Short
2011	Tamale Lesson	Lupita	Short
2011	Without Men	Ubaldina	
2011	Malaventura	Trixie	
2011	Silver Case	Lola	
2012	Art of Submission	Natania Sanchez	
2012	The Fantastic World of Juan Orol	Dinora	
2013	Ghost Team One	Fernanda	
2013	Mission Park	Gina	
2013	Geezers!	Tiffany	
2013	Coyote	Lilly	
2013	Caveman	Rosa	
2013	Pendejo	Jenny	
2013	The Negro Academy	Studying Abroad Latina Girl	Short
2013	Strike	Woman in Black	Short
2014	40 Love	Maria	Short
2014	Number Runner	Ebony	Video
2015	Honeyglue	Misty	
2015	400 Days	Zia	
2016	Is That a Gun in Your Pocket?	Connie	
2016	SinVerguenzas	LaFenix	
2016	Anamnesis	Celine	Short
2016	Tesla: Drive the Future	Girl #2	Short
2016	El Hotel	Alex	
2016	Spin	-	Short
2017	Moco	Blanca	Short
2017	Espionage Tonight	Valeria	
2018	Corbin Nash	Macy	
2018	¡He matado a mi marido!	Paloma Grande	
2018	Blood Stains	Isa	Short
2019	Possession Diaries	Detective #2	
2019	The Mortuary Collection	Rosa	
2019	Witchin'	Angelica	Short
2019	Faking Death	Teresa	Short
2020	Heavenquest: A Pilgrim's Progress	Fateen	
2021	Single Mother by Choice	Hypno Classmate	
2021	L.U.N.A.	Lillian Romero	Short
2022	Wild Hearts	Barbara	Short
2022	Wolf Mountain	Lexi	
2022	1660 Vine'	1660 Wine Girl Two	
2024	Karma: Death at Latigo Springs	Sylvia Jones	
2024	A Christmas Gamble	Lisa	
2024	The Containment'	Sister Esperanza	
2026	Getting Caught Using a Calculator	Mom	Short
2026	Just Like the Others	Dr. Raven Ellis	Short
2026	Cutthroat'	Vega	

=== Television ===
Year	Title	Role	Notes
2003	El alma herida	Clarita	Episode: "Episode #1.1"
2005	La ley del silencio	Virginia	Episode: "Episode #1.1"
2009	Eternamente tuya	Antonia	Main Cast
2011	RPM Miami	Luisa	Main Cast
2013	Chamacas	-	Recurring Cast
2015	Real Rob	Sara	Episode: "What's My Thing?"
2022	Undone	Patient	Episode: "Reflections"

=== Music videos ===
Year	Song	Artist	Role
2007	"She Builds Quick Machines"	Velvet Revolver	Angel Libertad
2011	"And I Had You There"	Frankie J	Main Girl
