= The Death and Life of Bobby Z =

- Theatrical release poster
- Directed by: John Herzfeld
- Written by: Bob Krakower; Allen Lawrence
- Based on: The Death and Life of Bobby Z by Don Winslow
- Produced by: Keith Samples; Matt Luber; Peter Schlessel
- Starring: Paul Walker; Laurence Fishburne; Olivia Wilde; Jason Flemyng; Keith Carradine; Joaquim de Almeida; Jason Lewis; J. R. Villarreal; Jacob Vargas
- Cinematography: John Bailey
- Edited by: Bruce Cannon; Alain Jakubowicz
- Music by: Tim Jones
- Production company: Millennium Films
- Distributed by: Sony Pictures Worldwide Acquisitions Group
- Release date: September 4, 2007 (United States)
- Running time: 97 minutes
- Countries: United States; Germany
- Languages: English; German
- Budget: $8 million
- Box office: $413,454

The Death and Life of Bobby Z, also known as Bobby Z and Let's Kill Bobby Z, is a 2007 American-German action film, directed by John Herzfeld, starring Paul Walker, Laurence Fishburne, Olivia Wilde and Joaquim de Almeida.

Sony Pictures Worldwide Acquisitions Group released the film direct-to-video in the United States.

Don Winslow, who wrote the 1997 novel on which the film is based, acknowledged that the screen adaptation was not successful, even though his novel was positively reviewed by several newspapers.

== Plot ==
Tim Kearney is a prison inmate who is recruited by federal agent Tad Gruzsa to impersonate drug dealer Bobby Z, so that Tim can be exchanged for Tad's colleague held hostage by drug kingpin Don Huertero. But at the exchange, just as Tim walks towards Huertero, Tad shoots at Tim and misses. Realizing that he was never expected to make it out of the exchange alive, Tim escapes.

Passing off as Bobby Z, Tim is taken to Brian's hacienda, where he meets Elizabeth. She says the boy Kit under her care is Bobby's son with Huertero's daughter, and that Huertero plans to kill Bobby for abandoning his daughter. Tim therefore decides to run away from Brian's place, but Kit tags along believing Tim to be his father Bobby Z. The duo are chased by Brian's men, but manage to flee to a neighboring town.

Huertero kills Brian since he allowed Bobby Z to escape, but lets Elizabeth and Brian's aide Johnson leave on the condition that they bring Bobby Z alive to Huertero within 3 days. Meanwhile, Tad hires hitmen for $20,000 to kill Tim.

At the new town, Tim, pretending to be Bobby Z, calls Monk for a passport and cash. When Tim returns to his hideout, Johnson is waiting for him. However, a bomb explodes killing Johnson, and Tim leaves with Kit to attend a party at Monk's place. He sees Elizabeth there, and she takes unsuspecting Tim to a beach house, where Huertero is waiting for him. Huertero angrily says that Bobby Z used his daughter and then dumped her, causing her to commit suicide. Elizabeth reveals that Kit is actually Huertero's grandson, when a fight ensues and Huertero is shot by Elizabeth while Tim kills the henchmen.

Monk meets up with Elizabeth in his boat, but Tim appears with a gun and steals both the boat and a bag of cash. Suddenly, the hitmen hired by Tad show up to kill Tim, but he runs away from the boat onto a bridge. Just before the hitmen shoot at Tim, Tad arrives at the spot with the real Bobby Z, and Tim points to Bobby Z and says he is Tim. The hitmen are confused as to who the real Tim is, when Kit and Elizabeth ride the boat to the bridge, and Kit calls Tim his dad. Aware that Tim Kearney does not have a child, the hitmen shoot down Bobby Z presuming him to be Tim. Both Bobby Z and Tad are killed in the shoot out, while Tim joins Elizabeth and Kit on a boat ride into the sea.

== Cast ==
- Paul Walker as Tim Kearney
- Laurence Fishburne as Tad Gruzsa
- Olivia Wilde as Elizabeth
- Jason Flemyng as Brian
- Keith Carradine as Johnson
- Joaquim de Almeida as Don Huertero
- J. R. Villarreal as Kit
- Jason Lewis as Bobby Z
- Jacob Vargas as Jorge Escobar
- Michael Bowen as Duke
- M. C. Gainey as "Boom-Boom"
- Josh Stewart as "Monk"
- Margo Martindale as Macy
- Chuck Liddell as "Maddog"
- Bruce Dern as Hippy Narrator (uncredited)

== See also ==
- Don (film series), earlier Indian film franchise with similar premise
