= O22 =

O22 or O-22 may refer to:

- Columbia Airport (California)
- Douglas O-22, an observation aircraft of the United States Army Air Corps
- HNLMS O 22, a submarine of the Royal Netherlands Navy
- Otoyol 22, a motorway in Turkey
- Oxygen-22, an isotope of oxygen
