= History of firefighting =

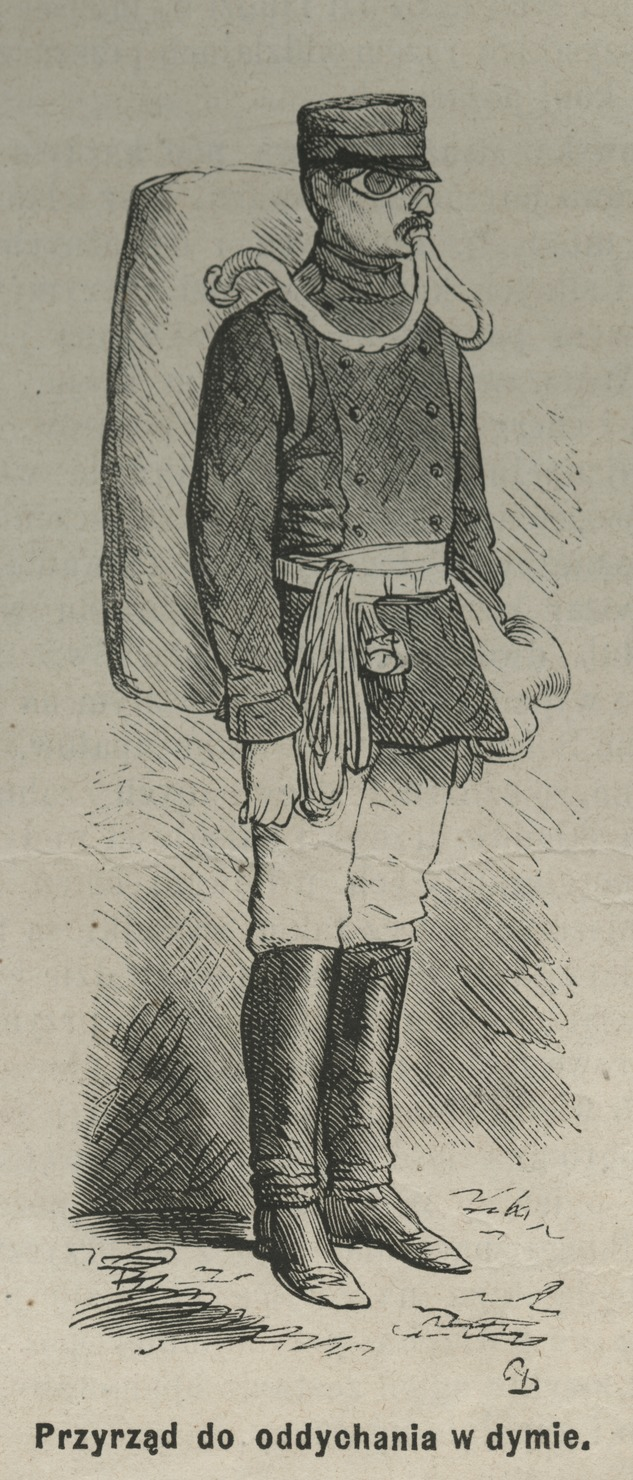
Firefighter from Warsaw wearing equipment for breathing in smoke ca. 1870. Polish caption reads "Przyrząd do oddychania w dymie."—"Smoke breathing device."

The history of organized firefighting began in ancient Rome while under the rule of the first Roman Emperor Augustus. Prior to that, Ctesibius, a Greek citizen of Alexandria, developed the first fire pump in the third century BC, which was later improved upon in a design by Hero of Alexandria in the first century BC.

== Ancient Rome ==
Roman Emperor Augustus formed a group of slaves, Vigiles, in AD 6 to combat fires using bucket brigades and pumps, as well as poles, hooks and even ballistae to tear down buildings in advance of the flames. The Corps Vigiles patrolled the streets of Rome to watch for fires and served as a police force. The later brigades consisted of hundreds of volunteers, all ready for action. When there was a fire, the men would line up to the nearest water source and pass buckets hand in hand to the fire.

Ancient Rome, known for its architectural marvels and sophisticated infrastructure, was also one of the first civilizations to implement organized firefighting efforts. Under the rule of Emperor Augustus, who reigned from 27 BC to 14 AD, Rome established a rudimentary firefighting force tasked with combating fires that frequently ravaged the city's densely populated neighborhoods.

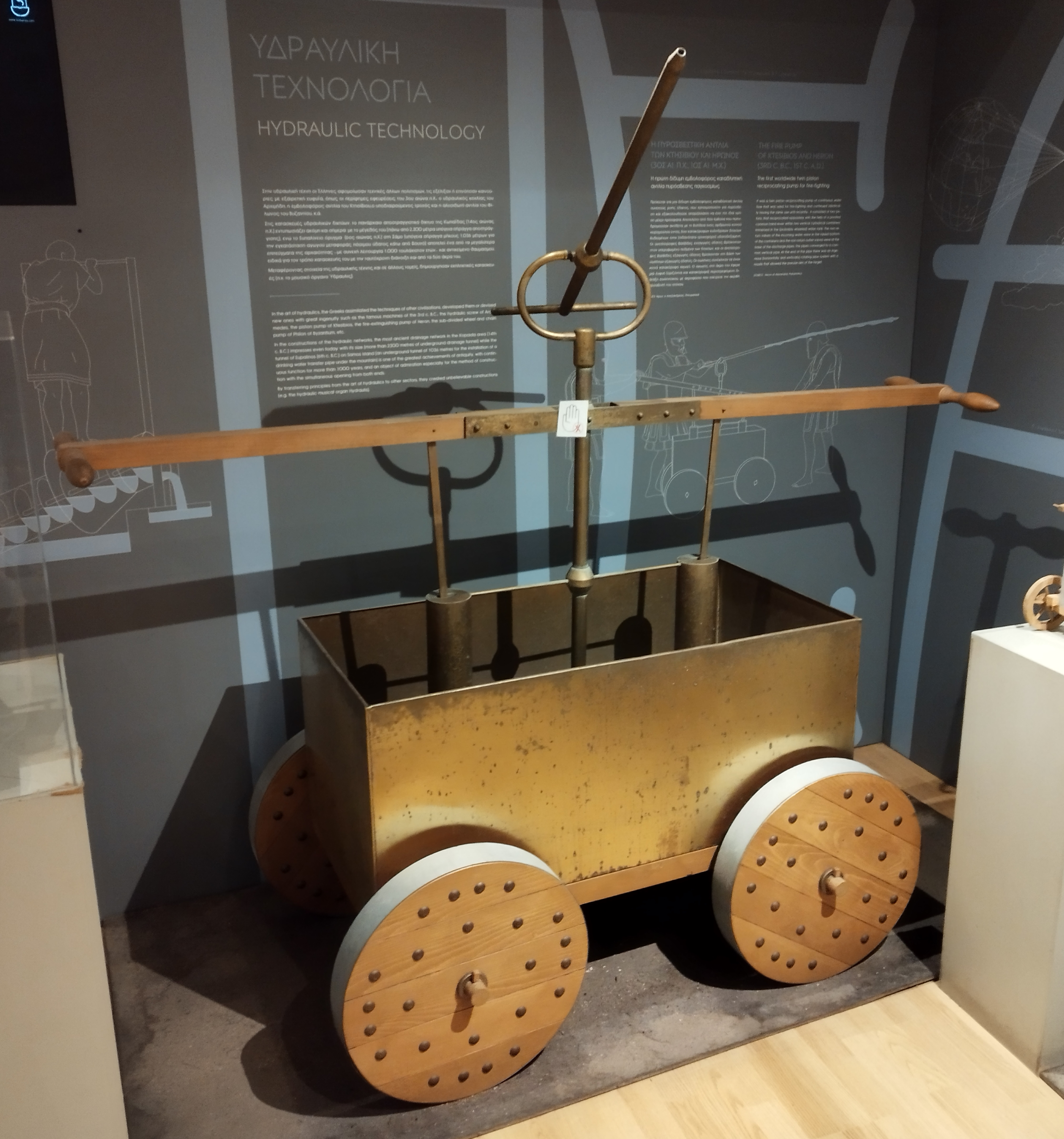
A hypothetical reconstruction of Ctesibius' and Heron's first fire pump at Kotsanas Museum of Ancient Greek Technology, in Athens, Greece.

Prior to the institutionalization of firefighting in Rome, Greek ingenuity contributed significantly to the development of early firefighting apparatus. Ctesibius, a Greek inventor hailing from Alexandria, is credited with creating the first known fire pump around the third century BC. This primitive device, employing principles of pneumatics, utilized water pressure to extinguish fires and was a crucial innovation in the fight against conflagrations.

Rome suffered a number of serious fires, most notably the fire on 19 July AD 64 which eventually destroyed two thirds of Rome.

== Early English ==
In Europe, firefighting was quite rudimentary until the 17th century. In 1254, a royal decree of King Saint Louis of France created the so-called guet bourgeois ("burgess watch"), allowing the residents of Paris to establish their own night watches, separate from the king's night watches, to prevent and stop crimes and fires. After the Hundred Years' War, the population of Paris expanded again, and the city, much larger than any other city in Europe at the time, was the scene of several great fires in the 16th century. As a consequence, King Charles IX disbanded the residents' night watches and left the king's watches as the only one responsible for checking crimes and fires.

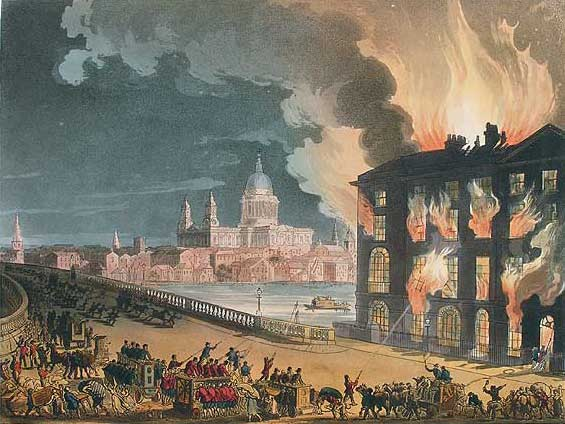
Firefighters tackling a fire in London using hand-pumped engines ca. 1808

London suffered great fires in the years 798 AD, 982 AD, 989 AD, 1212 AD and above all in 1666 (the Great Fire of London). The Great Fire of 1666 started in a baker's shop on Pudding Lane, consumed about two square miles (5 km^{2}) of the city, leaving tens of thousands homeless. Prior to this fire, London had no organized fire protection system. Afterwards, insurance companies formed private fire brigades to protect their clients’ property. These buildings were identified by fire insurance marks.

There is an urban legend that insurance brigades would only fight fires at buildings the company insured. This claim has been debunked.

The key breakthrough in firefighting arrived in the 17th century with the first fire engines. Manual pumps, rediscovered in Europe after 1500 (allegedly used in Augsburg in 1518 and in Nuremberg in 1657), were only force pumps and had a very short range due to the lack of hoses. German inventor Hans Hautsch improved the manual pump by creating the first suction and force pump and adding some flexible hoses to the pump. In 1672, Dutch artist and inventor Jan Van der Heyden's workshop developed the fire hose. Constructed of flexible leather and coupled every 50 feet (15 m) with brass fittings. The length remains the standard to this day in mainland Europe whilst in the UK the standard length is either 23m or 25m.

The fire engine was further developed by the Dutch inventor, merchant and manufacturer, John Lofting (1659–1742) who had worked with Jan Van der Heyden in Amsterdam. Lofting moved to London in or about 1688, became an English citizen and patented (patent number 263/1690) the "Sucking Worm Engine" in 1690. There was a glowing description of the firefighting ability of his device in The London Gazette of 17 March 1691, after the issue of the patent.

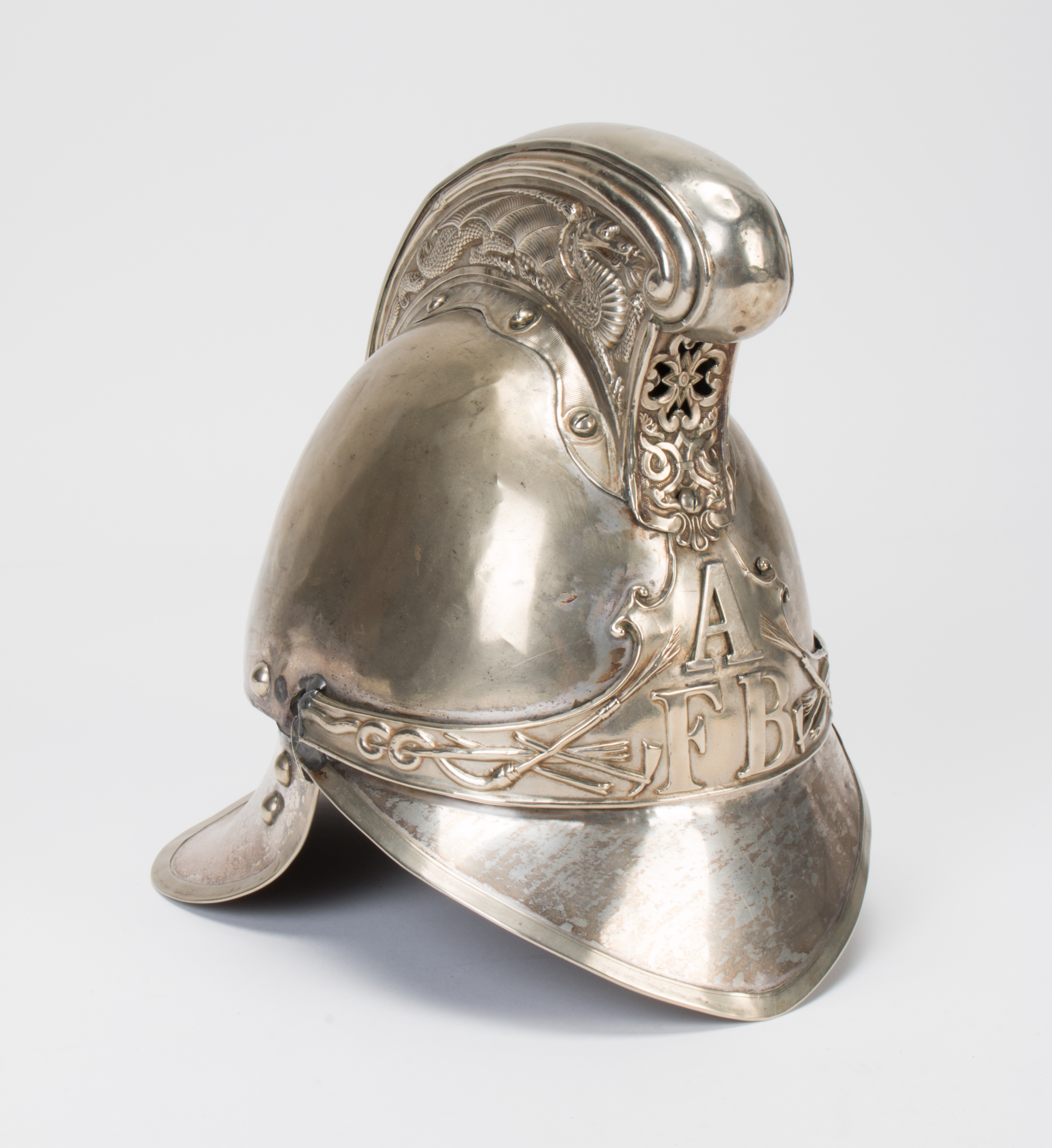
A helmet used by the superintendent of the Auckland Fire Board till 1874

The British Museum has a print showing Lofting's fire engine at work in London, the engine being pumped by a team of men. In the print three fire plaques of early insurance companies are shown, no doubt indicating that Lofting collaborated with them in firefighting. A later version of what is believed to be one of his fire engines has been lovingly restored by a retired firefighter, and is on show in Marlow Buckinghamshire where John Lofting moved in 1700. Patents only lasted for fourteen years and so the field was open for his competitors after 1704.

Richard Newsham of Bray in Berkshire (just 8 miles from Lofting) produced and patented an improved engine in 1721 (Royal Patent Office 1721 patent #439 and 1725 patent #479) and soon dominated the fire engine market in England. Pulled as a cart to the fire, these manual pumps were manned by teams of 4 to 12 men and could deliver up to 160 gallons per minute (12 L/s) at up to 120 feet (36 m). Newsham himself died in 1743 but his company continued making fire engines under other managers and names into the 1770s. The next major development in fire engine design in England was made by Hadley, Simpkin & Lott co. in 1792 with a larger and much improved style of hand pumped engine which could be pulled to a fire by horses.

== United States ==
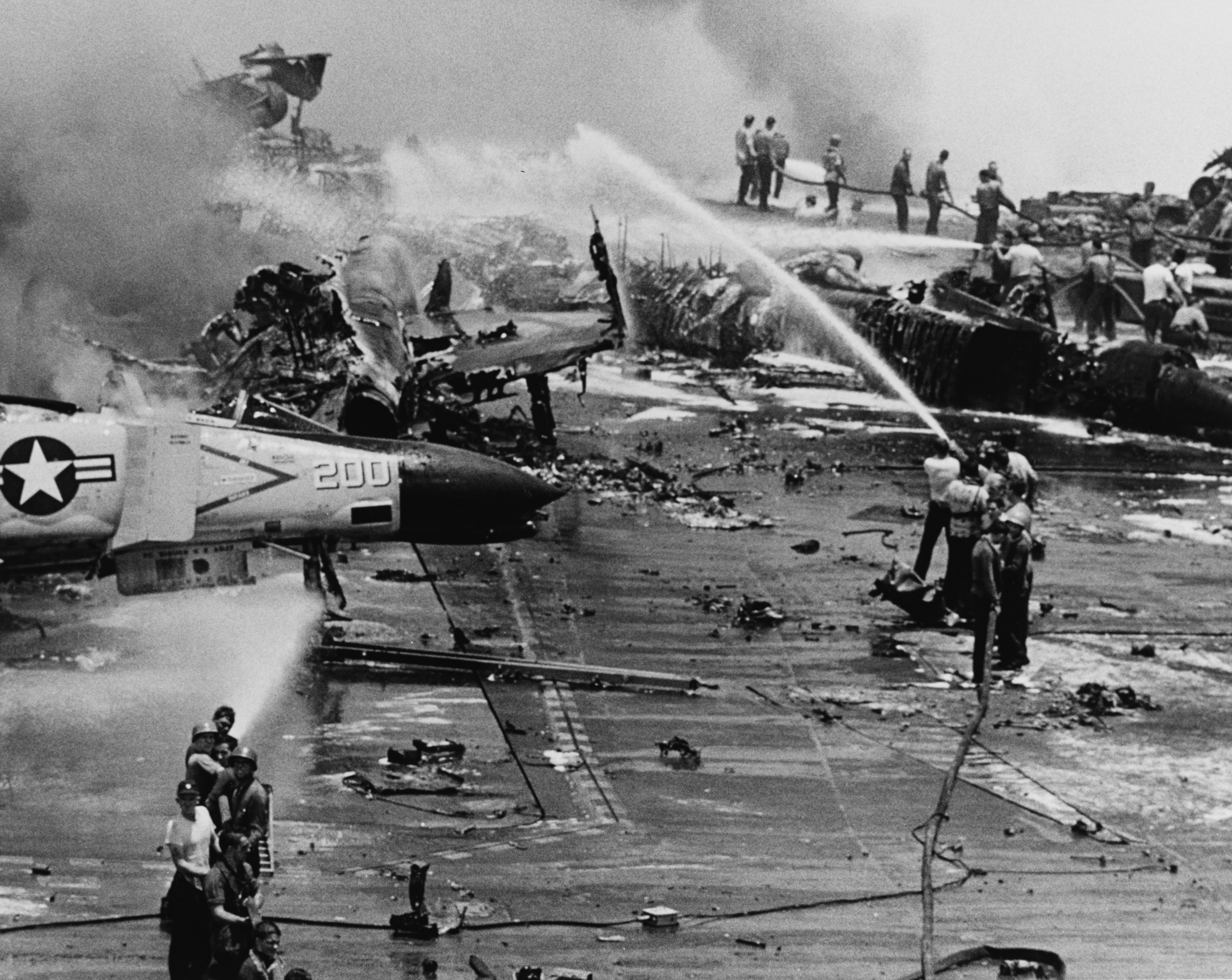
Firefighters onboard the USS Forrestal in 1967.

In 1631, Boston's governor John Winthrop outlawed wooden chimneys and thatched roofs. In 1648, the New Amsterdam governor Peter Stuyvesant appointed four men to act as fire wardens. They were empowered to inspect all chimneys and to fine any violators of the rules. The city burghers later appointed eight prominent citizens to the "Rattle Watch" - these men volunteered to patrol the streets at night carrying large wooden rattles. If a fire was seen, the men spun the rattles, then directed the responding citizens to form bucket brigades. On January 27, 1678 the first fire engine company went into service with its captain (foreman) Thomas Atkins. In 1736, Benjamin Franklin established the Union Fire Company in Philadelphia.

The United States did not have government-run fire departments until around the time of the American Civil War. Prior to this time, private fire brigades competed with one another to be the first to respond to a fire because insurance companies paid brigades to save buildings. Underwriters also employed their own Salvage Corps in some cities. The first known female firefighter, Molly Williams, took her place with the men on the dragropes during the blizzard of 1818 and pulled the pumper to the fire through the deep snow.

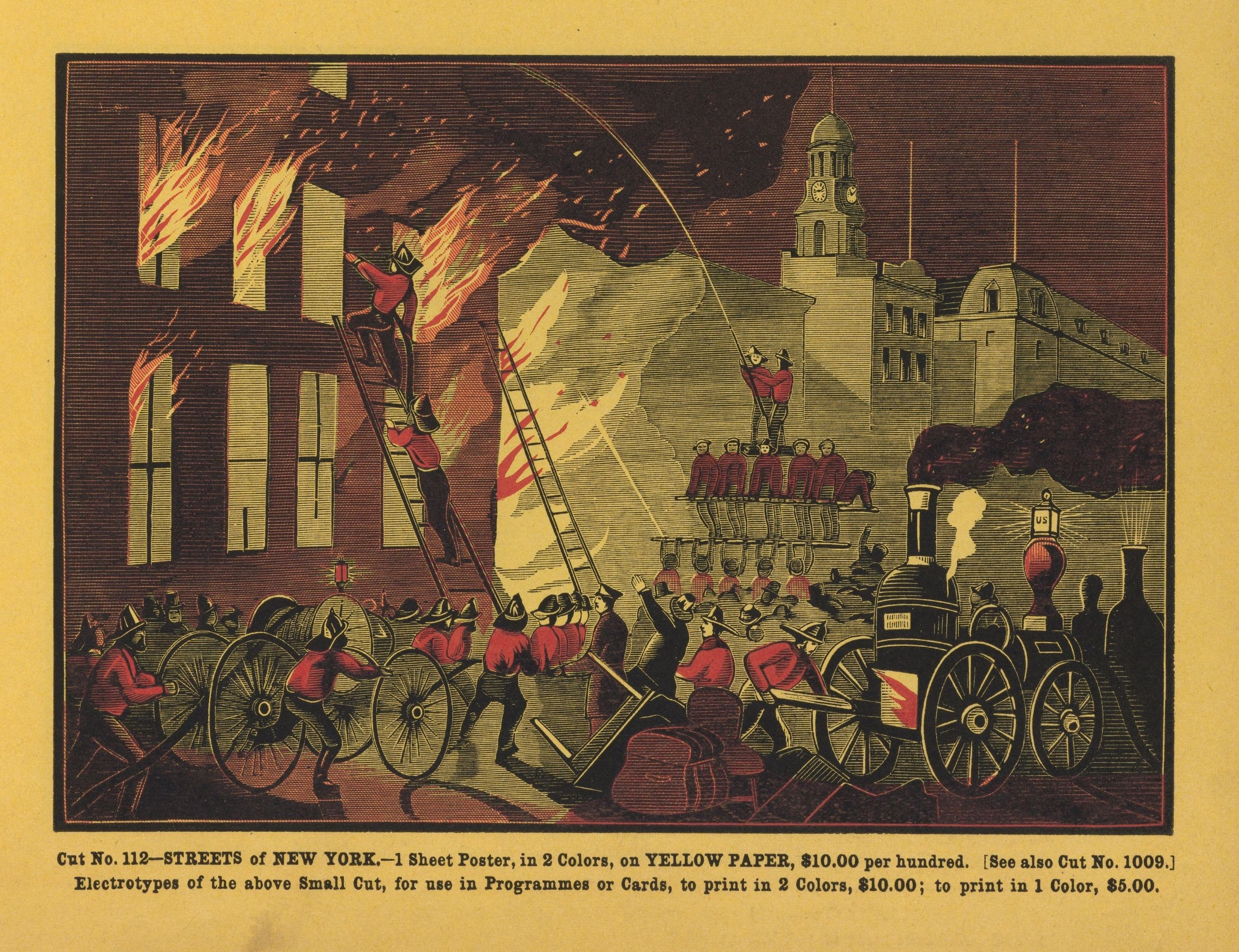
Fighting a fire in New York City, 1869 illustration

On 1 April 1853, Cincinnati, Ohio featured the first career fire department made up of 100% full-time employees. In 2015, 70% of firefighters in the United States were volunteers. Only 4% of calls regarded actual fires, while 64% regarded medical aid, and 8% were false alarms.

== Canada ==
The first organized fire department in Canada was created in Halifax, Nova Scotia, originally named the Union Fire Club. The next company to become established in the Maritimes in the 1780s such as in Saint John, New Brunswick where the Saint John Fire Department was established in 1786. Some departments were conceived as a mutual insurance and protection organization, which followed the governors requested rules and regulations. However, the second oldest department was formed in Montreal, Quebec.

== Modern development ==
The world's oldest Firefighter Corporation that is still alive to the present day takes location in Lisbon, Portugal, today called "Regimento de Sapadores Bombeiros de Lisboa" was created in 1395 with the name "Serviço de incendios de Lisboa"

The first fire brigades in the modern sense were created in France in the early 18th century. In 1699, a man with bold commercial ideas, François du Mouriez du Périer (grandfather of French Revolution general Charles François Dumouriez), solicited an audience with King Louis XIV. Greatly interested in Jan Van der Heyden's invention, he successfully demonstrated the new pumps and managed to convince the king to grant him the monopoly of making and selling "fire-preventing portable pumps" throughout the kingdom of France. François du Mouriez du Périer offered 12 pumps to the City of Paris, and the first Paris Fire Brigade, known as the Compagnie des gardes-pompes (literally the "Company of Pump Guards"), was created in 1716. François du Mouriez du Périer was appointed directeur des pompes de la Ville de Paris ("director of the City of Paris's pumps"), i.e. chief of the Paris Fire Brigade, and the position stayed in his family until 1760. In the following years, other fire brigades were created in the large French cities. Around that time appeared the current French word pompier ("firefighter"), whose literal meaning is "pumper." On March 11, 1733 the French government decided that the interventions of the fire brigades would be free of charge. This was decided because people always waited until the last moment to call the fire brigades to avoid paying the fee, and it was often too late to stop fires. From 1750 on, the French fire brigades became para-military units and received uniforms. In 1756 the use of a protective helmet for firefighters was recommended by King Louis XV, but it took many more years before the measure was actually enforced on the ground.

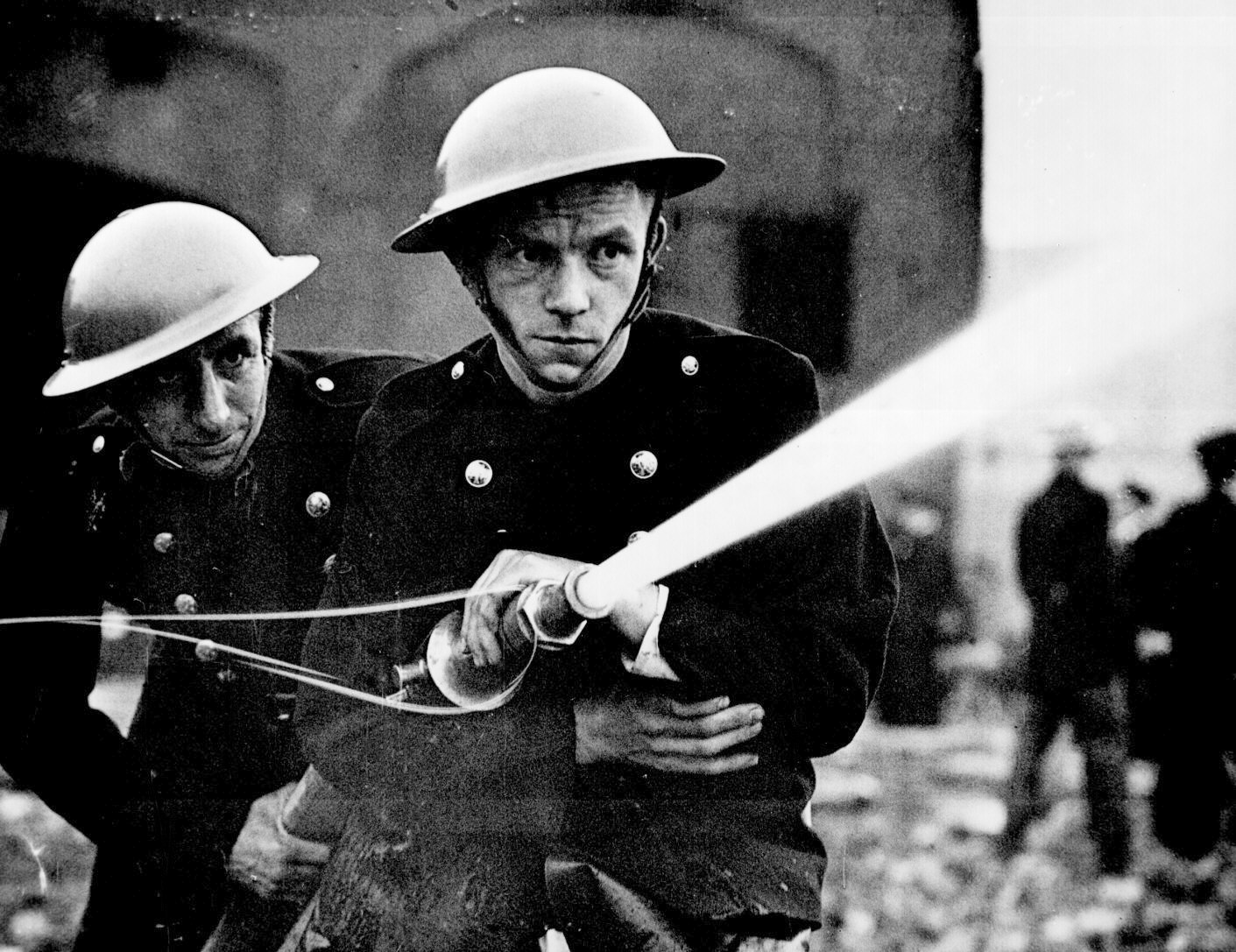
London Auxiliary Fire Fighting Services members during an exercise circa 1939

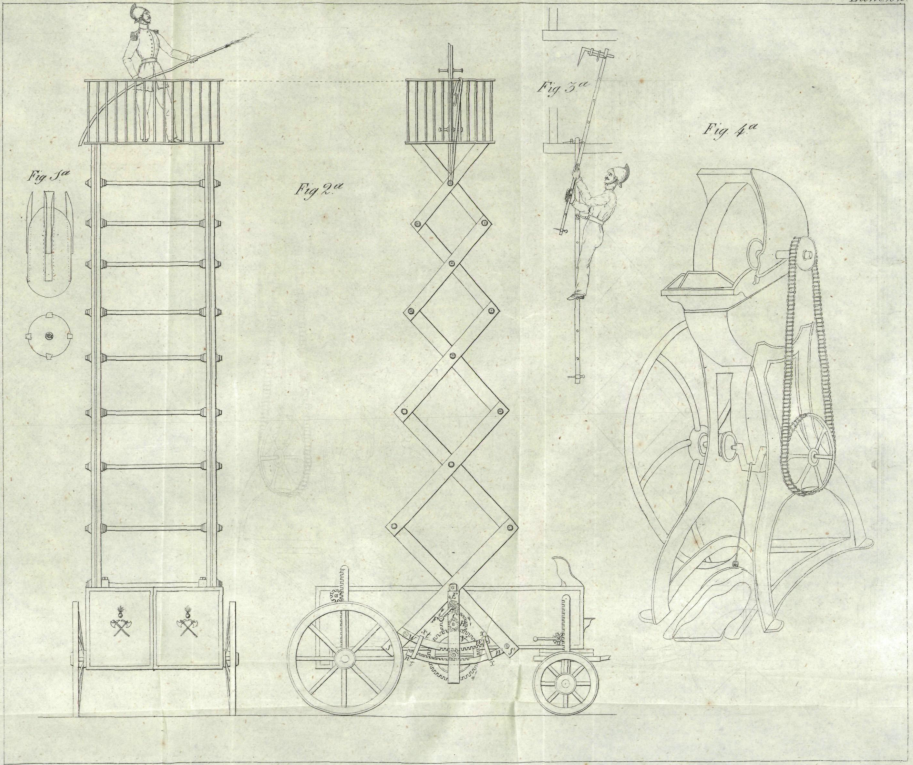
Firefighter Spain 1848 using a lifting platform

In North America, Jamestown, Virginia was virtually destroyed in a fire in January, 1608. There were no full-time paid firefighters in America until 1850. Even after the formation of paid fire companies in the United States, there were disagreements and often fights over territory. New York City companies were famous for sending runners out to fires with a large barrel to cover the hydrant closest to the fire in advance of the engines. Often fights would break out between the runners and even the responding fire companies for the right to fight the fire and receive the insurance money that would be paid to the company that fought it. During the 19th century and early 20th century volunteer fire companies served not only as fire protection but as political machines. The most famous volunteer firefighter politician is Boss Tweed, head of the notorious Tammany Hall political machine, who got his start in politics as a member of the Americus Engine Company Number 6 ("The Big Six") in New York City.

Napoleon Bonaparte, drawing from the century-old experience of the gardes-pompes, is generally attributed as creating the first "professional" firefighters, known as Sapeurs-Pompiers ("Sappers-Firefighters"), from the French Army. Created under the Commandant of Engineers in 1810, the company was organized after a fire at the ballroom in the Austrian Embassy in Paris which injured several dignitaries.

In the UK, the Great Fire of London in 1666 set in motion changes which laid the foundations for organised firefighting in the future. In the wake of the Great Fire, the City Council established the first fire insurance company, "The Fire Office", in 1667, which employed small teams of Thames watermen as firefighters and provided them with uniforms and arm badges showing the company to which they belonged.

However, the first organised municipal fire brigade in the world was established in Edinburgh, Scotland, when the Edinburgh Fire Engine Establishment was formed in 1824, led by James Braidwood. London followed in 1832 with the London Fire Engine Establishment.

On April 1, 1853, the Cincinnati Fire Department became the first full-time paid career fire department in the United States, and the first in the world to use steam fire engines.

The first horse-drawn steam engine for fighting fires was invented in England in 1829, but it was not accepted in structural firefighting until 1860. It continued to be ignored for another two years afterwards. Self-propelled steam-powered fire engines were introduced in 1903, followed by internal combustion engine fire apparatuses which began to be produced as early as 1905, leading to the decline and disappearance of horse-drawn, hand-pumped, and steam-powered fire engines by the mid 1920s.

== See also ==
- Bombay Explosion (1944)
- Firematic Racing
- Great Fire of London
- List of fire departments
- List of fires
- History of the Belfast Fire Brigade
- Fires in Edo
