= Columbia, California =

Columbia
- Census-designated place
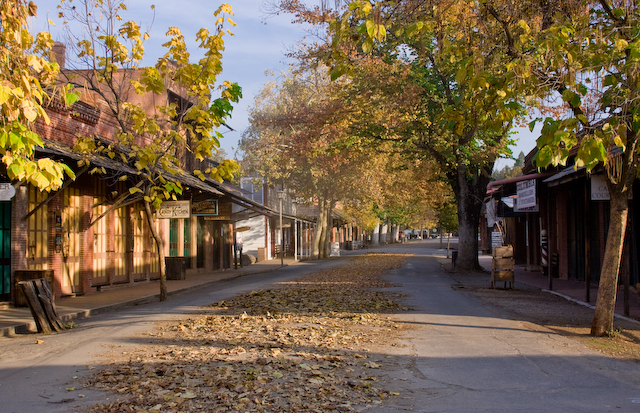
- Main Street in Columbia, California

- Location in Tuolumne County and the state of California

- Location in the United States
- Coordinates: 38°02′00″N 120°24′35″W
- Country: United States
- State: California
- County: Tuolumne

Area
  - Total: 5.98 sq mi (15.49 km^{2})
  - Land: 5.96 sq mi (15.44 km^{2})
  - Water: 0.019 sq mi (0.05 km^{2}) 0.31%
- Elevation: 2,133 ft (650 m)

Population (2020)
  - Total: 2,577
  - Density: 432/sq mi (166.9/km^{2})
- Time zone: UTC-8 (Pacific (PST))
  - Summer (DST): UTC-7 (PDT)
- ZIP code: 95310
- Area code: 209
- FIPS code: 06-14904
- GNIS feature ID: 2407648

California Historical Landmark
- Reference no.: 123

Columbia is a census-designated place (CDP) located in the Sierra Nevada foothills in Tuolumne County, California, United States. As of the 2020 census, Columbia had a population of 2,577. It was founded as a boomtown in 1850 when gold was found during the California Gold Rush, and was known as the "Gem of the Southern Mines."

The town's historic central district is within the Columbia State Historic Park, which preserves the 19th century mining town legacy. The U.S. historic district is a National Historic Landmark District and is on the National Register of Historic Places.

== Geography ==
Columbia is located along State Route 49 just north of Sonora, at an altitude of 2,139 feet (652 m).

According to the United States Census Bureau, the CDP has a total area of 6.0 square miles (16 km^{2}). Only 0.31% of the total area is covered by water.

=== Climate ===
This region experiences hot and dry summers, with no average monthly temperatures above 90.1 °F (32.3 °C). According to the Köppen Climate Classification system, Columbia has a warm-summer Mediterranean climate, abbreviated "Csb" on climate maps.

== History ==
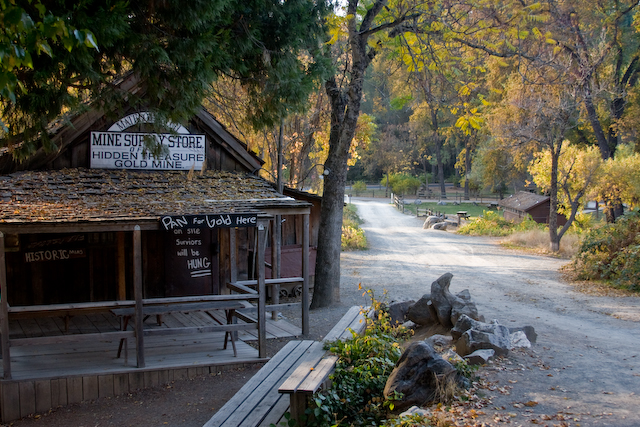
Old store offering gold panning, within Columbia State Historic Park

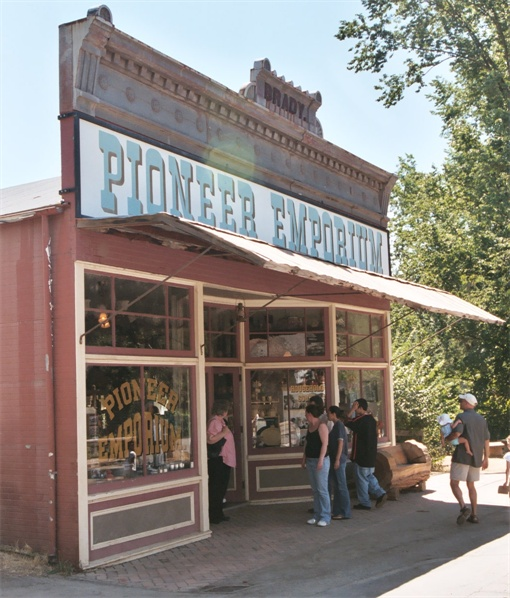
Columbia State Historic Park preserves aspects of the town's Gold Rush legacy

The original indigenous people in the Columbia region were the Miwok.

Rev. John Steele wrote about his time in the gold rush era and about the "Mi-wuk" of Columbia in his memoirs In Camp and Cabin.

Within weeks of finding gold in the vicinity of Columbia, thousands of people arrived and the population climbed to 5,000. By 1852, there were 8 hotels, 4 banks, 17 general stores, 2 bookstores, 1 newspaper, 3 churches, and over 40 drinking/gambling establishments. Between 1850 and the early 1900s, $87 million (~$2.54 billion in 2024) in gold was removed from the surrounding hills.

In 1851, the local community brass band, a popular institution, greeted the arrival of the first "white woman" in town. Columbia had five cemeteries, including a Boot Hill, where burials were made without markers.

In 1854, Columbia's first major fire destroyed a majority of the city. The wealthier merchants began rebuilding their business using brick with iron construction materials, the remainder of town was rebuilt of wood and canvas. In 1857, another fire burned down nearly everything else, except three brick buildings. The Columbia one-room school house was built in 1860, renovated in 1872, and finally closed in 1937. It was purchased by the state of California for $1 in 1947, and incorporated into the historic district park.

According to the 1954 episode "11,000 Miners Can't Be Wrong" of the western anthology series Death Valley Days, Columbia lost out in an 1854 bid to become the permanent California state capitol: When Jim Hardwicke, a respected settler, informs the sheriff that he had killed a man in self-defense, Hardwicke is forced to stand trial. Because of jury tampering by a corrupt district attorney, Hardwicke was found guilty. His lawyer, Ed Barrett and his fiancée develop a bizarre scheme to free his client from the hangman's noose; Barrett steals from a safe in the local bank a petition with 11,000 signatures of persons who at the instigation of the same district attorney want Columbia to be the capital, rewrites the first page to call for a pardon for Hardwicke and appeals to the governor, who is impressed that so many signed. The governor orders Hardwicke's release, but Sacramento became the capital. However, the series' episodes tended to be "based on fact" rather than historically accurate.

By 1860, the gold mined in Columbia was diminishing rapidly. The only land left to mine was in the city itself. Miners dug under buildings and tore down houses to get at the gold beneath the city. Copper deposits were found in the area, with the nearby town of Copperopolis experiencing a boom. The bricks from the destroyed buildings in Columbia were sold for new construction in Copperopolis.

In 1862, just days after the Battle of Puebla in Mexico, Columbia was the site of the first official Cinco de Mayo celebrations. According to a paper published by the UCLA Center for the Study of Latino Health and Culture about the origin of the observance of Cinco de Mayo in the United States, the modern American focus on that day first started in Columbia in response to the resistance to French rule in Mexico. "Far up in the gold country town of Columbia, California, Mexican miners were so overjoyed at the news that they spontaneously fired off rifle shots and fireworks, sang patriotic songs and made impromptu speeches."

Columbia, in its heyday, was California's fifth-largest city, boasting a population of about 25,000 people although only about 2,000 people now live in this region. Unlike many gold rush boomtowns, Columbia never became a ghost town. In 1934 under a state sponsored New Deal program of archaeological research, the SERA (State Emergency Relief Administration) hired 65 research workers at U.C. Berkeley's Bancroft Library and 56 additional workers in the field to gather the necessary information to provide for the restoration of the old town. In 1945, California created Columbia State Historic Park from the remains of the historical buildings of the city.

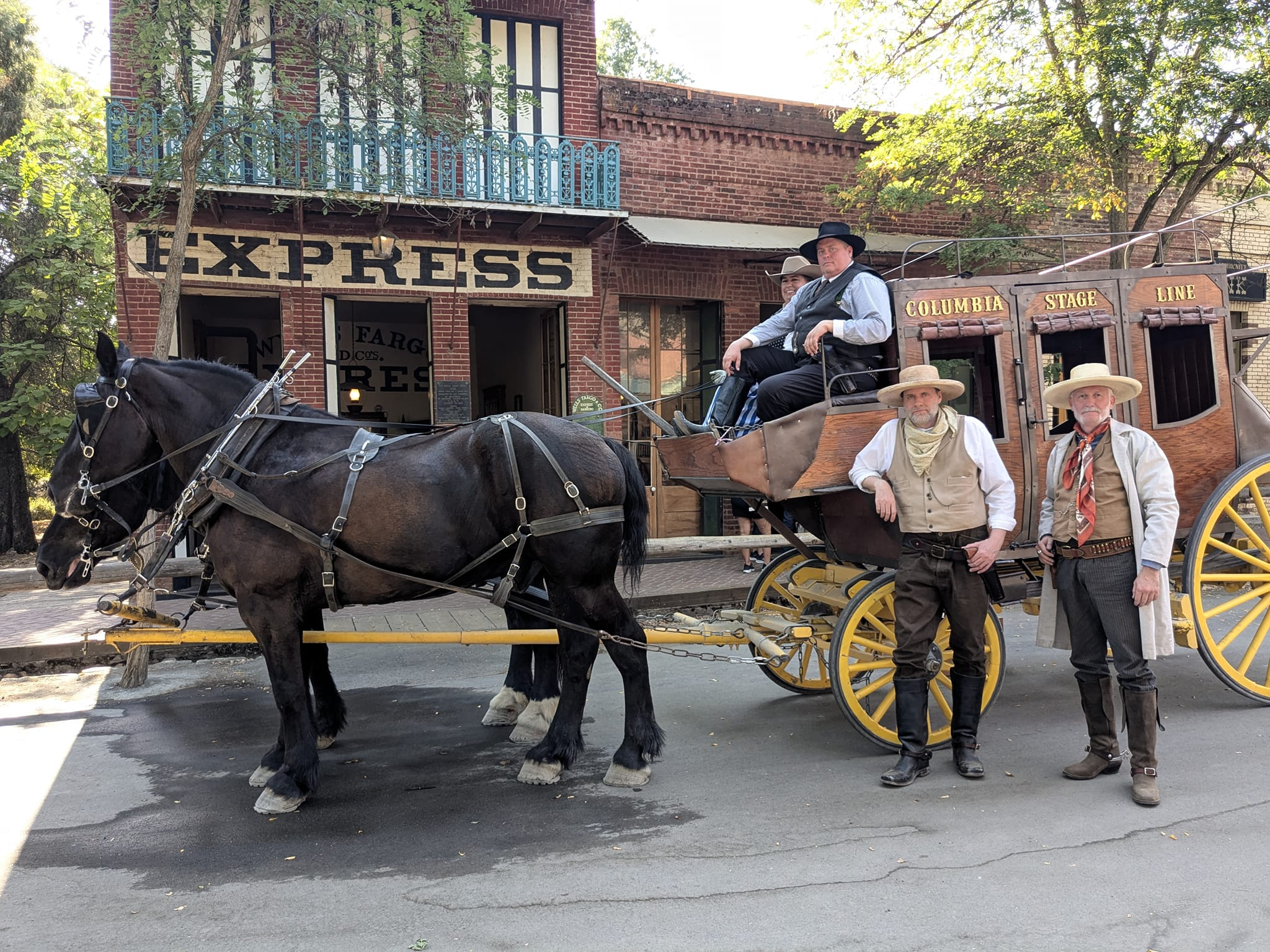
Stagecoach Ride

=== Visitor attractions ===
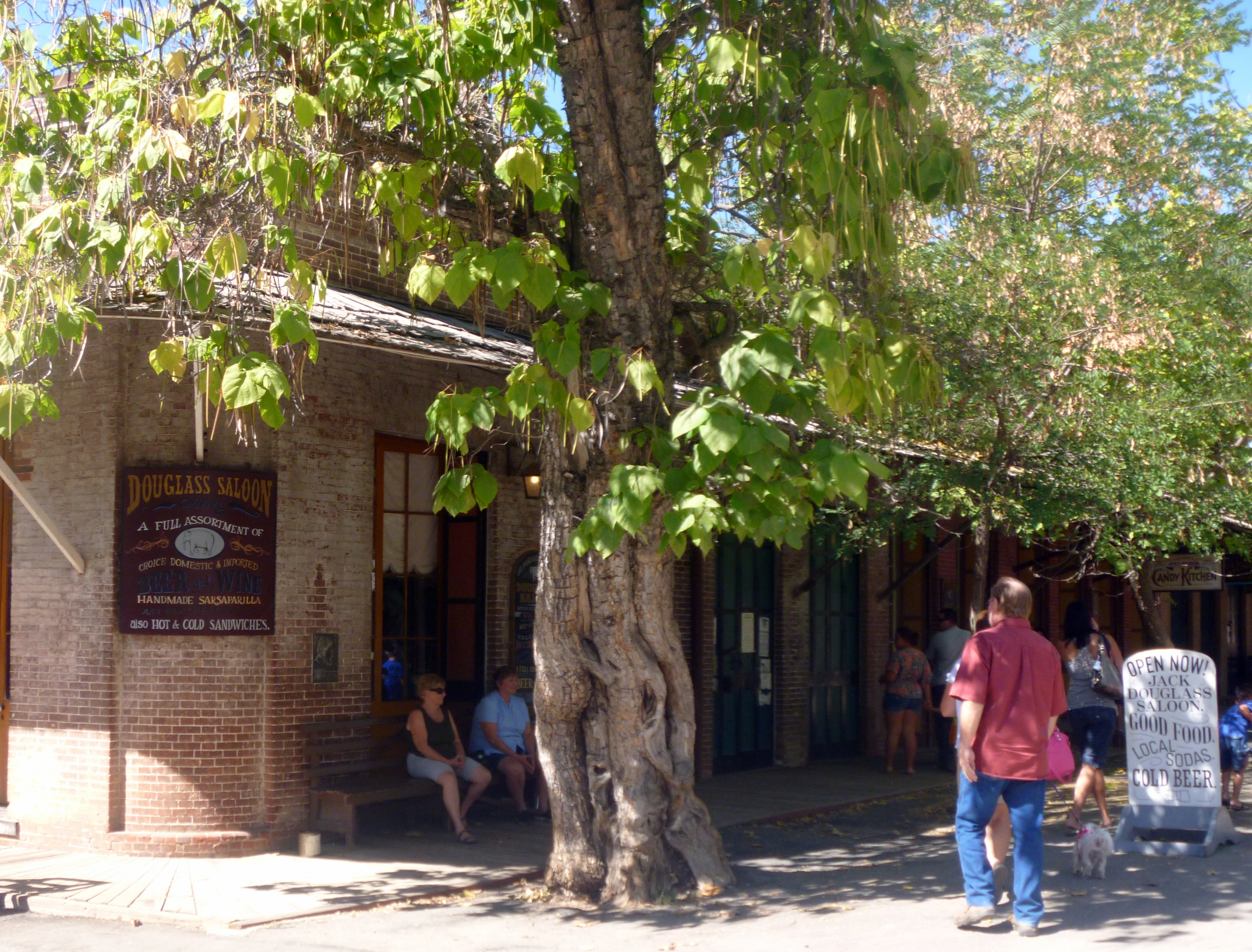
Historic Douglass Saloon, still open in Columbia State Historic Park

A parade is part of the annual Columbia Fire Muster, in May

Columbia's main street in the historic district, part of the Columbia State Historic Park, is closed to automobile traffic, but horses, carriages, bicycles and pedestrians are welcomed. Known for the huge rock gardens left over from the hydro mining efforts in the 1800s, the area is very popular with families for picnicking and leisurely walks. The antique buildings are leased to era-themed businesses such as gold-panning, candle-dipping, iron-mongering, and crafts. There are several eating establishments. A chicken coop with beautiful Dominique hens lends a sweet background sound to Main Street. A horse-drawn stagecoach ride for a fee is the main attraction. There are numerous events throughout the year; some of the notable occasions are the Fourth of July parade and Columbia Diggins 1852. Occasionally local crafters set up booths along Main Street. Costumed State Park employees and shopkeepers lend to the era-theme of the park. Picnic tables are situated throughout the downtown. There is a short hiking trail from the School House, which is located a couple of blocks from the town. The school is open with static exhibits. Two campgrounds nearby accommodate tenting and motorhomes, as well as a small general store for supplies.

Other points of interest in the area include Columbia Community College, a two-year, community college; and the Columbia Airport (FAA designator: O22), which has one 4,670-foot (1,420 m) runway and is busy with firefighting aircraft during summer.

The annual Columbia Fire Muster here is often the earliest of California's summer musters.

== Demographics ==
Historical population
Census	Pop.	Note	%±
1860	1,125		—
1870	2,062		83.3%
1990	1,799		—
2000	2,405		33.7%
2010	2,297		−4.5%
2020	2,577		12.2%
U.S. Decennial Census; 1850–1870 1880-1890; 1900 1910 1920; 1930 1940 1950; 1960 1970 1980; 1990 2000 2010

Columbia first appeared as a census designated place in the 1990 U.S. census.

=== Racial and ethnic composition ===
Columbia CDP, California – Racial and ethnic composition Note: the US Census treats Hispanic/Latino as an ethnic category. This table excludes Latinos from the racial categories and assigns them to a separate category. Hispanics/Latinos may be of any race.
Race / Ethnicity (NH = Non-Hispanic)	Pop 2000	Pop 2010	Pop 2020	% 2000	% 2010	% 2020
White alone (NH)	2,079	1,954	1,988	86.44%	85.07%	77.14%
Black or African American alone (NH)	21	25	8	0.87%	1.09%	0.31%
Native American or Alaska Native alone (NH)	24	23	38	1.00%	1.00%	1.47%
Asian alone (NH)	28	26	42	1.16%	1.13%	1.63%
Native Hawaiian or Pacific Islander alone (NH)	3	1	3	0.12%	0.04%	0.12%
Other race alone (NH)	0	2	17	0.00%	0.09%	0.66%
Mixed race or Multiracial (NH)	84	95	173	3.49%	4.14%	6.71%
Hispanic or Latino (any race)	166	171	308	6.90%	7.44%	11.95%
Total	2,405	2,297	2,577	100.00%	100.00%	100.00%

=== 2020 census ===
As of the 2020 census, Columbia had a population of 2,577 and a population density of 432.3 inhabitants per square mile (166.9/km^{2}). The median age was 50.3 years. The age distribution was 17.2% under 18, 10.4% from 18 to 24, 17.6% from 25 to 44, 24.9% from 45 to 64, and 30.0% were 65 years of age or older. For every 100 females, there were 89.2 males, and for every 100 females age 18 and over, there were 86.9 males.

57.7% of residents lived in urban areas, while 42.3% lived in rural areas.

The census reported that 96.2% of the population lived in households, 3.5% lived in non-institutionalized group quarters, and 0.2% were institutionalized. There were 1,150 households, out of which 20.5% included children under the age of 18. Of all households, 39.4% were married-couple households, 7.7% were cohabiting couple households, 20.3% had a male householder with no spouse or partner present, and 32.7% had a female householder with no spouse or partner present. About 36.6% of households were one person, and 22.1% were one person aged 65 or older. The average household size was 2.16. There were 624 families (54.3% of all households).

There were 1,293 housing units at an average density of 216.9 units per square mile (83.7 units/km^{2}), of which 1,150 (88.9%) were occupied and 11.1% were vacant. Of the occupied units, 65.0% were owner-occupied and 35.0% were renter-occupied. The homeowner vacancy rate was 1.3% and the rental vacancy rate was 10.2%.

Racial composition as of the 2020 census
Race	Number	Percent
White	2,093	81.2%
Black or African American	9	0.3%
American Indian and Alaska Native	45	1.7%
Asian	45	1.7%
Native Hawaiian and Other Pacific Islander	3	0.1%
Some other race	106	4.1%
Two or more races	276	10.7%

=== Income and poverty ===
In 2023, the US Census Bureau estimated that the median household income was $57,647, and the per capita income was $32,651. About 7.8% of families and 14.6% of the population were below the poverty line.

=== 2010 census ===
The 2010 United States census reported that Columbia had a population of 2,297. The population density was 384.1 inhabitants per square mile (148.3/km^{2}). The racial makeup of Columbia was 2,064 (89.9%) White, 27 (1.2%) African American, 26 (1.1%) Native American, 29 (1.3%) Asian, 1 (0.0%) Pacific Islander, 27 (1.2%) from other races, and 123 (5.4%) from two or more races. Hispanic or Latino of any race were 171 persons (7.4%).

The Census reported that 2,226 people (96.9% of the population) lived in households, 71 (3.1%) lived in non-institutionalized group quarters, and 0 (0%) were institutionalized.

There were 1,002 households, out of which 243 (24.3%) had children under the age of 18 living in them, 432 (43.1%) were opposite-sex married couples living together, 125 (12.5%) had a female householder with no husband present, 51 (5.1%) had a male householder with no wife present. There were 53 (5.3%) unmarried opposite-sex partnerships, and 4 (0.4%) same-sex married couples or partnerships. 330 households (32.9%) were made up of individuals, and 142 (14.2%) had someone living alone who was 65 years of age or older. The average household size was 2.22. There were 608 families (60.7% of all households); the average family size was 2.80.

The population was spread out, with 470 people (20.5%) under the age of 18, 201 people (8.8%) aged 18 to 24, 406 people (17.7%) aged 25 to 44, 735 people (32.0%) aged 45 to 64, and 485 people (21.1%) who were 65 years of age or older. The median age was 47.8 years. For every 100 females, there were 97.3 males. For every 100 females age 18 and over, there were 92.9 males.

There were 1,117 housing units at an average density of 186.8 per square mile (72.1/km^{2}), of which 661 (66.0%) were owner-occupied, and 341 (34.0%) were occupied by renters. The homeowner vacancy rate was 2.1%; the rental vacancy rate was 8.1%. 1,389 people (60.5% of the population) lived in owner-occupied housing units and 837 people (36.4%) lived in rental housing units.

== Notable people ==
- Delmer Berg, veteran of both the Spanish Civil War and World War II, lived in Columbia.
- Jon Robert Cavaiani, Medal of Honor recipient who lived in Columbia.
- Drew Gagnon, Major League and KBO pitcher, was born in Columbia.
- Red Kress, Major League Baseball player and coach, was born in Columbia.
- Peter Muldoon, Roman Catholic Bishop of the Diocese of Rockford, was born in Columbia.
- Slim Pickens, actor, lived in Columbia and was a member of the Church of the 49er.
- Doodoo Wah, comedy folk duo Ron DeLacy and Dave Cavanagh, lived in Columbia.
- Joe Haratani, WWII veteran US Army's 442nd Regimental Combat Team

== As a filming location ==
A few of the more than 100 movies and TV series filmed in Columbia include:

- Sierra Spirits, 2007
- Behind the Mask of Zorro, 2005
- Radio Flyer, 1992
- Blood Red, 1989
- Pale Rider, 1985
- The Shadow Riders, 1982
- Joe Dancer: The Big Trade, 1981
- The Last Ride of the Dalton Gang, 1979
- Law of the Land, 1976
- Little House on the Prairie, 1974
- Something for a Lonely Man, 1968
- Bullwhip, 1958
- Rage at Dawn, 1955
- Texas Lady, 1955
- The Cimarron Kid, 1952
- Death Valley Days, 1952
- High Noon, 1952
- The Lone Ranger, 1949
- The Red House, 1947
- Rustlers' Valley, 1937
- Wells Fargo, 1937
- The Best Bad Man, 1925
- Timber Stampede, 1939

== Government ==
In the California State Legislature, Columbia is in the 4th senatorial district, represented by Republican Marie Alvarado-Gil, and in the 8th Assembly district, represented by Republican David Tangipa.

In the United States House of Representatives, Columbia is in California's 5th congressional district, represented by Republican Tom McClintock.

== Airport ==
The Columbia Airport, a general aviation airfield located approximately one mile from the city, is home to an aerial firefighting air attack base operated by the California Department of Forestry and Fire Protection (Cal Fire) which bases fixed-wing turboprop aircraft as well as a helicopter there.

== Notes ==
=== References ===
- Abel, E. Lawrence (2000). Singing the New Nation: How Music Shaped the Confederacy, 1861-1865. Mechanicsburg, Pennsylvania: Stackpole Books. ISBN 0-8117-0228-6.
- Hoover, Mildred B.; Douglas E. Kyle (2002). Historic Spots in California. Stanford University Press. ISBN 978-0-8047-4482-9.
