= Richard Newsham =

English inventor (died 1743)

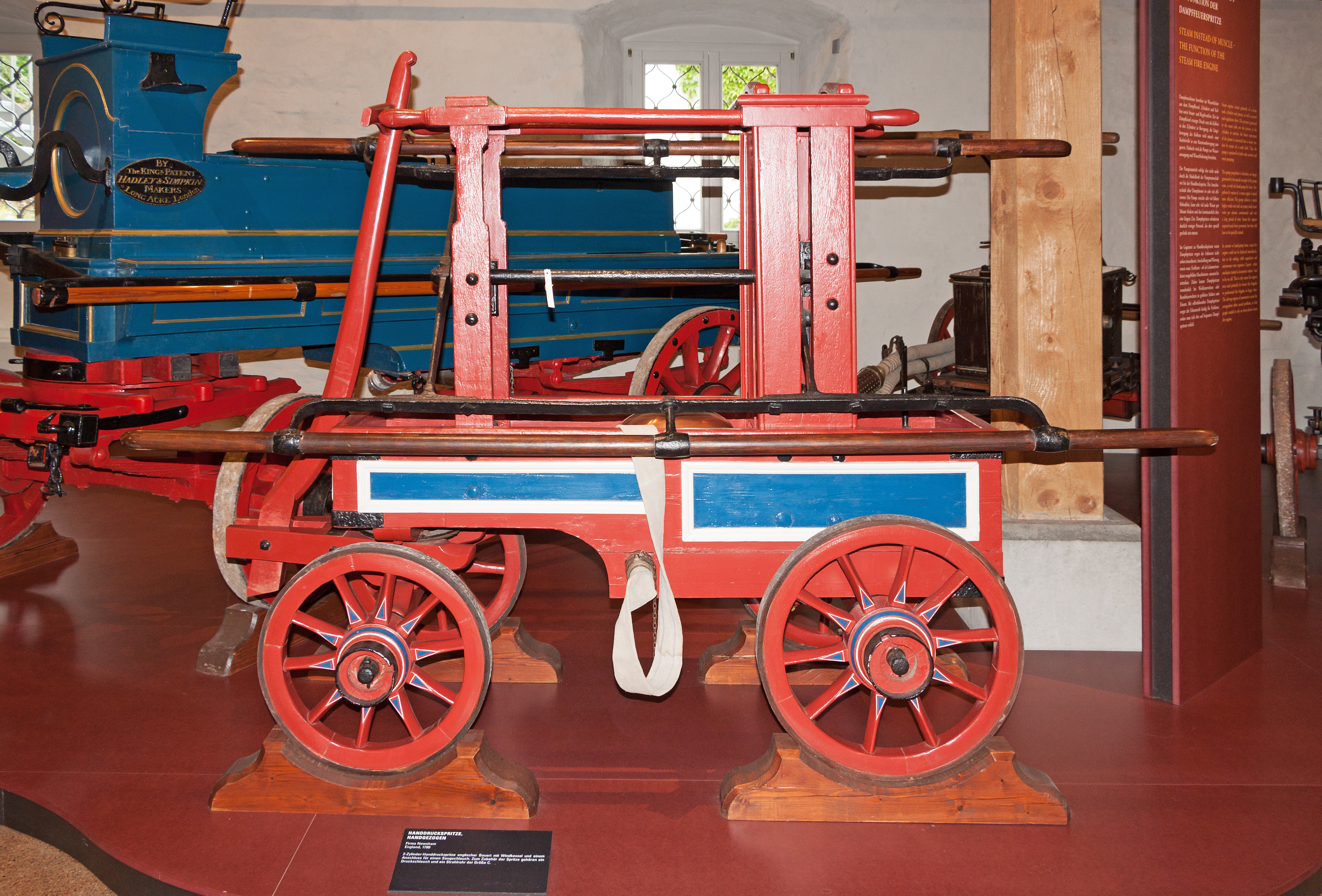
Fire engine manufactured by Newsham and Ragg, 1780

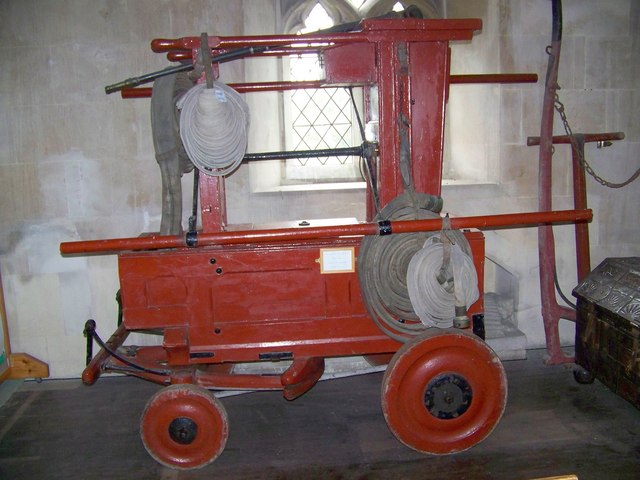
Oldest known fire engine by Newsham purchased in 1728, St Giles Church, Great Wishford - geograph.org.uk - 957081. Image: Trish Steel

Richard Newsham (died 1743) was an English inventor. He took out two patents for fire engines in 1721 and 1725 (Royal Patent Office 1721 patent #439 and 1725 patent #479) and soon dominated the fire engine market in England. The engine had two single-acting pistons and an air vessel placed in a tank which formed the frame of the machine. The pump was worked by people at the long cross handles. At the front of the engine, protected by a sheet of horn and a door, were directions for keeping the machine in order. The cistern could hold about 170 US gallons (640 L) of water pumping up to 100 US gallons (380 L) a minute. New York City imported its first two fire engines from Newsham in 1731. In 1737 Newsham made a manual fire pump for the Parish of Bray in Berkshire.

When Richard Newsham died in 1743 the company was willed to his son Lawrence Newsham. When Lawrence died in 1747 he bequeathed the company to his widow and his cousin George Ragg and the company became Newsham and Ragg.

== See also ==
- Fire apparatus
- History of fire fighting
- Brief origin of American LaFrance fire engines.
