= Muster (event) =

Competitive skills event held between fire departments

A muster (or "fire muster") is an event pertaining to fire/rescue services. It is held in a central area such as a park and has many activities for fire department members and sometimes other community members. A muster typically revolves around a firematic competition between fire companies from around the surrounding area. Other attractions include a flea market, live music, food, demonstrations, apparatus judging, vehicle shows and contests.

== Competition Events ==
These events differ in the format of each muster but most follow a basic structure.

Hose Lay: The hose lay consists of a race against the clock to see which team can connect hoses the fastest. Competitors start at a starting line, and on the signal, run to couple lengths of hose in various configurations.

Hose Roll: In hose roll, competitors race each other to roll up a length of hose unfurled in a straight line in front of them from one end to the other.

Midnight Alarm: Midnight alarm is supposed to simulate a fire call in the middle of the night. Competitors either start out "sleeping" by lying down on the starting line or simply standing on it, depending on local rules. At the starting signal, competitors must run a distance of about 25 ft to the dressing area where they must don firefighter's gear. After they are all dressed, they then must complete a task together in their gear such as a hose lay (see above) or simply run to a finish line, or the "firetruck". Fastest time wins.

Ladder Climb: In ladder climb, competitors race each other for the fastest time to reach the top of a ladder.

Bucket Brigade: In the bucket brigade race, competitors must work together in a bucket brigade to transfer a set amount of water, such as 25 gallons, from one container to another spilling as little as possible. Another variant of this uses a small house roughly 48 inches by 48 inches and roughly 6 feet tall, the water must be drawn by buckets from a small pool. These buckets are then passed from member to member roughly 10 feet to a "thrower" the thrower then throws the water on the pitched roof of the building. The water runs off the roof into a rain gutter which drains into a barrel which is about 25-30 gallons in capacity, this water then runs into a small tube which fills a 1-gallon jug. The timer ends when the jug is filled.

Tug of War: This is a game where Competitors (most often equal on both sides) must pull their opposing team across a line, into a puddle, etc. A team is meant to resist their competitor's effort to pull them across the line.

Water Barrel: Competitors must move a barrel across the opposing team's line using water pressure from a fire hose.

Obstacle Course: An obstacle course can consist of any combination of the events above or other tasks.

Response Contest: There are several variations of this one but the premise is the same in all. The Crew (4-6 team members) simulates receiving an alarm, responding to and handling the alarm. The firefighters start out in street clothes and dress in full turnout gear (Helmet, Coat, and boots) board their fire engine and respond approximately 200 feet up the course to a portable water tank, the engine crew simultaneously stretches 100–150 feet of 2 1/2-inch hose toward a target area as other crew members place hard suction hose to the intake on the engine and another member connects the 2 1/2" line to the discharge. The pump operator must then draft water from the portable tank and discharge it through the 2 1/2-inch hose to knock down a target (usually a beer keg or traffic cone with a ball on top) This contest checks crew integrity, skill of the equipment operator, skill of the nozzle crew, and operation of the equipment. When done by a well versed team it can be done in under a minute as was accomplished many times in the late 1980s and early 1990s at Greenfield Village SPAAMFAA musters in Michigan. Some variations include stadium response where apparatus does not drive, another variation is the crew is lying on cots on an elevated platform and must slide down a pole. One variation exempts the equipment operator from wearing gear however it must be on the truck.

First Water: The pumps on fire trucks don't help if there's not a skilled person operating the controls. This race pits teams against the clock to see who can get a steady stream of water to the deluge gun (on the end of the hose) the quickest. The operator starts 10 feet from the pumper without the pump in gear, the operator must engage the pump, and pull a draft and have a working stream quickly. The fastest time for this event wins, judging is usually broken up in classes for centrifugal, piston, and rotary gear pumps. Another variant is Bracket pumping where the operator guesses how long it will take him to perform the same tasks, his score is the difference in seconds from his guess to his actual.

Waterball: Two teams of firefighters face off on a course 110 feet in length and the object is to push a 15" ball suspended from a cable to the opposing team's goal. This is played using 1 1/2-inch hose and each team has a lead hose team and a goaltender hoseline.
