= Columbia State Historic Park =

California State Historic Park

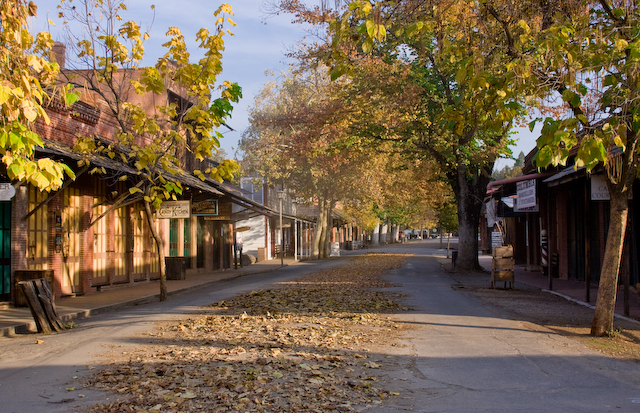
- Main Street in Columbia State Historic Park

- Location within California Location within the United States
- Location: Tuolumne County, California, United States
- Nearest city: Columbia, California
- Coordinates: 38°2′9″N 120°24′4″W
- Area: 273 acres (110 ha)
- Established: 1945
- Governing body: California Department of Parks and Recreation
- Columbia Historic District
- U.S. National Register of Historic Places
- U.S. National Historic Landmark District
- Built: 1854
- NRHP reference No.: 66000242

Significant dates
- Added to NRHP: October 15, 1966
- Designated NHLD: July 4, 1961

Columbia State Historic Park, also known as Columbia Historic District, is a state park unit and National Historic Landmark District preserving historic downtown Columbia, California, United States. It includes almost 30 buildings built during the California Gold Rush, most of which remain today. It was declared a National Historic Landmark in 1961.

== Description ==
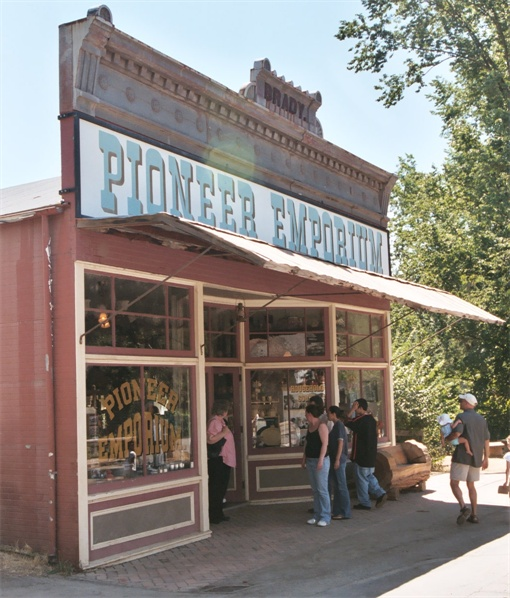
A general store in Columbia

The site was proclaimed a state historic park July 15, 1945, and the restored buildings are operated as an inhabited, working open-air museum. Individuals in period costumes run a handmade candy store, a Daguerreotype studio, and stagecoach rides, among other stores and restaurants. The Columbia Museum, formerly the Cavalier Museum, is located in the Knapp building.

Volunteers with the Friends of Columbia State Historic Park host many special living history programs at the park each year. During Gold Rush Days, held the second Saturday of each month, park docents in period clothing lead programs in the park, and there are special exhibits and hands-on activities. Free tours of the town are offered on weekends year-round and daily in the summer.

== History ==
Gold was discovered in the area that became Columbia on March 27, 1850, by John Walker, who was a member of Thadeus and George Hildreth's party. This discovery was one of the richest finds of the California Gold Rush. The surface-level deposits were amenable to placer mining, but lacked water needed for such operations.

Over the next several years, a network of water supply aqueducts was built (at a cost of over $1 million) to the area to support mining operations.

By 1852, sufficient water was arriving to support the development of a mining boom town, and large-scale mining operations began in 1856.

The ditch was officially completed in 1858. The town was incorporated in 1854, and its population fluctuated in the 1850s between 2,000 and 5,000 people. The town was repeatedly struck by fire, and much of the construction after an 1857 fire was in brick.

== Media exposure ==
Columbia State Historic Park has been used as a shooting location for many films and television scenes. High Noon includes scenes filmed in 1952 in and around the Wilson House, on Main Street and in front of Engine House #2. The Shadow Riders (1982) was also filmed in and around Columbia.

== See also ==
- List of California state parks
- List of National Historic Landmarks in California
