= Radio Flyer (film) =

1992 American film

- Theatrical release poster
- Directed by: Richard Donner
- Written by: David Mickey Evans
- Produced by: Lauren Shuler Donner
- Starring: Lorraine Bracco; John Heard; Elijah Wood; Joseph Mazzello; Adam Baldwin
- Cinematography: László Kovács
- Edited by: Stuart Baird
- Music by: Hans Zimmer
- Production companies: Stonebridge Entertainment; Donner/Shuler-Donner Productions
- Distributed by: Columbia Pictures
- Release date: February 21, 1992
- Running time: 114 minutes
- Country: United States
- Language: English
- Budget: $35 million
- Box office: $4.6 million

Radio Flyer is a 1992 American drama-fantasy film directed by Richard Donner and written by David Mickey Evans. It stars Lorraine Bracco, John Heard, Elijah Wood, Joseph Mazzello, Adam Baldwin, and Ben Johnson and is narrated by Tom Hanks. Evans was to make his directorial debut on the film but was replaced by Donner. Michael Douglas and Evans were executive producers. Filming locations included Novato, California, and Columbia Airport in Columbia, California.

Radio Flyer was released by Columbia Pictures on February 21, 1992. The film received mixed reviews from critics and was a box office bomb, grossing $4.6 million against a $35 million budget.

== Plot ==
Mike observes his two sons fighting, with one insisting that a promise doesn't mean anything. To help them understand that a promise does mean something, he tells them the story of his youth. In 1969, 11-year-old Mike, 8-year-old Bobby, their mother, Mary, and their German Shepherd, Shane, relocate from New Jersey to Novato, California after their father leaves the family. There, Mary weds Jack MacKenzie, who demands the children call him "The King". Unbeknownst to Mary, Jack is an alcoholic who often gets drunk and beats Bobby. He also repeatedly plays Hank Williams's "Jambalaya (On the Bayou)" on his record player.

Thinking that Mary has found happiness at last with Jack, Bobby swears Mike to secrecy about the abuse. Instead, the two boys seek adventures to occupy the time that would otherwise be spent around Jack; they recount the "seven great abilities and fascinations" of childhood while exploring their new surroundings and dealing with the neighborhood bullies. An unsupervised incident in the kitchen in which the boys attempt to create an anti-monster potion to get rid of Jack leads to Bobby being hospitalized by Jack, but Shane gets revenge by biting him hard on the arm. After spending time in jail, Jack is released following the death of his mother and returns to their house with flowers and chocolates, promising never to drink or abuse Bobby again; he violates his promise while the boys are at school and nearly kills Shane. The brothers devise a plan for Bobby to escape Jack once and for all. Mary also starts to catch on to Jack's true nature and finally tells him she wants a divorce.

Inspired by the urban legend of a boy named Fisher who attempted to fly away on his bicycle over a cliff nicknamed “The Wishing Spot”, the two convert their eponymous Radio Flyer toy wagon into an airplane in the hopes of sending Bobby and Shane away from harm. They draw up a schematic diagram with wings and an engine and scavenge numerous parts, secretly using Jack's tools to build the aircraft in their shed. The boys also raise money through various means, such as retrieving lost balls on a golf course and selling them back to golfers. After leaving a farewell letter for their mother, the brothers take the device to the cliff at night, but Jack discovers their plan and attempts to stop them, pushing Shane into furiously attacking him again. Bobby then speeds down the hill alone, knocking out Jack with the wing of his plane, and triumphantly soars into the air as Mike and Shane look on. Mary arrives with police officer Jim Daugherty, who arrests Jack. Though Mike never sees Bobby again, he continues to receive postcards from him from places all over the world.

Back in the present, Mike reiterates to his sons the importance of keeping a promise, and imparts a lesson about history being in the mind of the teller. He concludes his story by saying, "That's how I remember it."

== Cast ==
- Lorraine Bracco as Mary Marshall
- John Heard as Officer Jim Daugherty
- Elijah Wood as Michael “Mike” Marshall
  - Tom Hanks as Older Mike / Narrator (uncredited)
- Joseph Mazzello as Robert “Bobby” Marshall
- Adam Baldwin as Jack "The King" MacKenzie (Jack's face is barely seen throughout the film)
- Ben Johnson as Bill "Geronimo Bill"
- Garette Ratliff as Chad
- Thomas Ian Nicholas as Ferdie

== Production ==
David Mickey Evans's script for Radio Flyer was a hot property around Hollywood, and Warner Bros. and Columbia Pictures started a bidding war around it in November 1989. Warner had eyes on it as a vehicle for veteran director Richard Donner, while Columbia was buying it on behalf of Michael Douglas's production outfit Stonebridge Entertainment, which had a major production deal with the latter studio. Just before Thanksgiving, Columbia paid Evans a huge sum for a first-time Hollywood screenwriter: $1.25 million. The deal also gave Evans the opportunity to direct even though he had no prior experience helming a film. Douglas, however, believed Evans had the vision to pull it off. This was the first film Columbia put into production under the ownership of Sony, as well as one of the first films to be greenlit by the studio's new management, led by Peter Guber and Jon Peters.

Filming started on June 18, 1990. Under Evans's direction, the film starred Rosanna Arquette as Mary, Tomas Arana as Jack, Luke Edwards as Mike and James Badge Dale as Bobby. The budget was set at $17–18 million after Evans agreed to cut some expensive effects sequences. However, Stonebridge executives found the dailies disappointing, and after 10 days of filming, Douglas shut down production, at a loss of $5 million. Douglas then recruited Richard Donner as the film's new director. With Evans's blessing, Donner accepted with a $5 million paycheck, while his wife, producer Lauren Shuler Donner, came on board. Evans remained on the film as an executive producer. With the major players recast, Radio Flyer resumed production that October. Donner had Evans rewrite the script extensively to find a way to balance escapist fantasy and child abuse without alienating the audience.

The film's original ending featured a present-day coda where a now-adult Mike, played by Tom Hanks, takes his children to the National Air and Space Museum, where the Radio Flyer/Plane hybrid is displayed next to the Wright Brothers' flying machine. Test audiences were confused by this ending and re-shoots led to the modern-day prologue and epilogue seen in the final film.

A video game adaption of the film was being developed for the Super Nintendo Entertainment System by Ocean Software.

The film was dedicated to the memory of script supervisor Nancy Benta Hansen and uncredited production assistant Simone Fuentes, "whose professionalism and humor we miss."

== Reception ==
On Rotten Tomatoes the film has an approval rating of 35% based on reviews from 40 critics. The site's consensus is: "Overlaying its whimsical concept onto a gritty story of domestic abuse, Radio Flyer is a family film that is too harrowing for children and too saccharine for their parents."

Roger Ebert and Leonard Maltin both criticized the film for presenting fantasy as a way of escaping child abuse. Said Ebert, "I was so appalled, watching this kid hurtling down the hill in his pathetic contraption, that I didn't know which ending would be worse. If he fell to his death, that would be unthinkable, but if he soared up to the moon, it would be unforgivable—because you can't escape from child abuse in little red wagons, and even the people who made this picture should have been ashamed to suggest otherwise."

Because the film in fact ends with Bobby successfully evading his stepfather forever, viewers (including Ebert himself) have taken to speculating on the "true" ending, assuming that the one presented was a case of an unreliable narrator.

In a 2004 interview promoting Eternal Sunshine of the Spotless Mind, Elijah Wood recalled his time on Radio Flyer fondly. He praised Richard Donner as an "amazing" director and remembered the warm atmosphere on set. He particularly recalled celebrating his tenth birthday during the shoot, with Donner giving gifts to both him and co-star Joseph Mazzello to ensure no one felt left out. Wood highlighted that it was a fun and positive experience.
