= Columbia Airport (California) =

Airport in California, United States

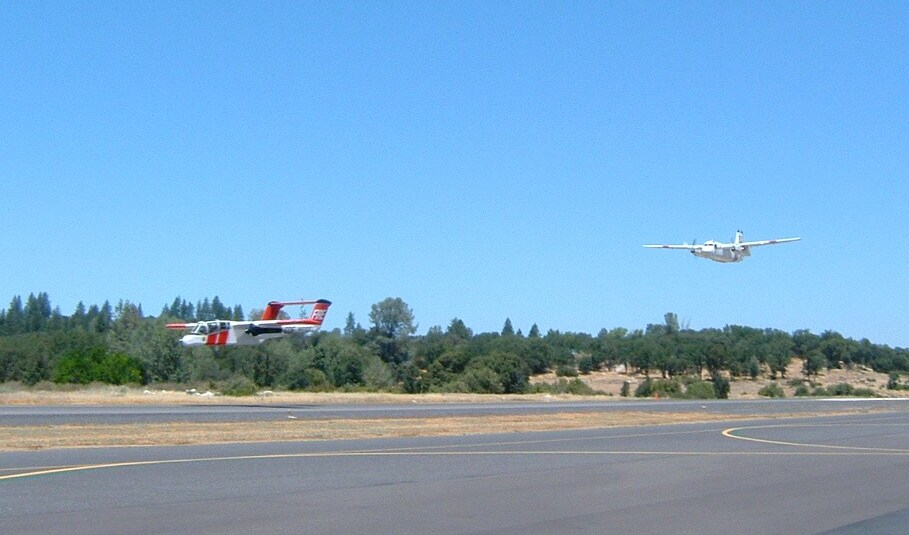
- CAL FIRE OV-10 and S-2T aircraft performing a flyby over Columbia Airport in March 2007
- IATA: COA; ICAO: none; FAA LID: O22

Summary
- Airport type: Public
- Owner: County of Tuolumne
- Location: Columbia, California
- Elevation AMSL: 2,121 ft (646 m)
- Coordinates: 38°01′50″N 120°24′52″W
- Interactive map of Columbia Airport

Runways
Direction	Length		Surface
Direction	ft	m	Surface
11/29	2,607	795	Turf
17/35	4,673	1,424	Asphalt

Statistics (2019)
- Aircraft operations (year ending 6/25/2019): 45,657
- Based aircraft: 103
- Source: Federal Aviation Administration

Columbia Airport (IATA: COA, FAA LID: O22) is located a mile southwest of Columbia, in Tuolumne County, California, United States. It is owned by the County of Tuolumne.

== Facilities ==
Columbia Airport covers 356 acres (144 ha) and has two runways: 17/35 is 4,673 x 75 ft (1,424 x 23 m) asphalt and 11/29 is 2,607 x 50 ft (795 x 15 m) turf.

In the year ending June 25, 2019, the airport had 45,657 aircraft operations, average 125 per day: 96% general aviation, 4% air taxi and <1% military. 103 aircraft were then based at the airport: 95 single engine, 7 multi-engine, and 1 helicopter.

Maintenance Services

Jake's Air Repair serves Columbia Airport since 2010 and offers airframe & powerplant service and repairs, training & instruction.

Flight Schools & Instruction

Columbia Flying Club offers aircraft rental & flight training.

== Cal Fire Firefighting Air Attack Base ==
The California Department of Forestry and Fire Protection (CAL FIRE) operates an aerial firefighting air attack base at the airport with five aircraft based at the airfield. The typical complement of aircraft is one Rockwell OV-10 tactical (spotter) airplane, two Grumman S-2T air tankers, and one Sikorsky S-70i helicopter. The base also hosts a helitack crew, a team of wildland firefighters who are transported by helicopter to fires. In addition to the firefighting mission, the helicopter is also equipped with a hoist for search and rescue missions. The Columbia Air Attack Base has facilities for refilling water and retardant on up to six firefighting aircraft, on rotation.

== Historical air service ==
The airport had scheduled passenger airline service operated by Yosemite Airlines, a small commuter air carrier which was based at Columbia Airport, from the mid-1970s to the early 1980s. According to the Official Airline Guide (OAG) as well as the airline's timetables, Yosemite Airlines flew nonstop and direct service between the airport and Sacramento International Airport (SMF), San Francisco International Airport (SFO) and Oakland International Airport (OAK) with small Beechcraft, Cessna and Piper prop aircraft. The airline's route maps from this same time period also show nonstop service from the airport to Lake Tahoe, Modesto and Stockton.

In 1999, Scenic Air, another commuter airline, was operating daily nonstop service between the airport and Oakland International Airport (OAK) with Grumman Gulfstream I propjet aircraft.

The airport was used as a filming location for several sequences in the 1992 film Radio Flyer.
