= Firematic Racing =

Firematic racing (or Drill Team racing) is a proprietary name for a type of recreational competition among the firefighter teams involving timed completion of tasks related to or simulating common firefighting activities. The sport under its present name is most popular on Long Island, and other parts of New York State, although similar types of competition, known under different names, exist in other parts of the world.

== History ==
Ever since the beginning of the fire service, when ladders, hoses - and even buckets - were invented as a way to extinguish fires, there was always a spirit of competition among firefighters as to who could be the first to extinguish the fire. In these early days, a monetary reward was paid to those who were able to extinguish a fire. Out of this spirit of competition grew a unique form of racing team, which although can be found in a few different areas across the United States, has its roots with and is most widely practiced in the Long Island region of New York State.

What began long ago as simple, unsophisticated footraces have evolved into season-long competitions between numerous rival racing teams, with several different classes of competition, along with officiating and modern equipment. The sport has evolved to include the use of a digital scoreboard. The Joe Hunter Memorial Scoreboard is used at drills to keep the competitors and fans aware of the event standings as well as the point standings for the whole drill. A new another new addition has been Drill Team Radio which broadcasts live on an FM signal at almost every drill. The Broadcast is also streamed live via the internet for fans living across the country and abroad to be able to listen to the drill. (go to the official site listed below and click on the Drill Team Radio link to listen to a drill in the archives or listen live to a drill on the schedule)

== Regulation and organization ==
In New York State, competition is controlled by the New York State Volunteer Firemen's Parade and Drill Team Captains Association, Inc. (NYSVFP&DTCA), which provides the officials, as well as regulating competition. The NYSVFP&DTCA holds annual meetings in which the rules governing competition are reviewed and updated if necessary.

The NYSVFP&DTCA is further divided into four divisions, of which each team is a member. The divisions are based on region, with two for Long Island (Nassau and Suffolk) and two for northern New York (Western and Northern).

== Old-Fashioned vs. Motorized Drill Teams ==
There are two different categories of Drill-Team racing: Old-Fashioned racing teams, compete in competitions where all of the competitors race on foot, and any hoses or ladders that are used are carried on a small hand-pulled two-wheeled cart. Motorized racing teams, which use two different classes of "truck" to race with: the Class-B racer, which is typically a heavily modified older-model pickup truck retro-fitted with a pump, and the Class-C racer, which bears a resemblance to a modified dragster. (a "Class-A" truck is a typical firehouse pumper, such as an American LaFrance, E-One or Sutphen brand) Both the Class-B and Class-C racers have a pickup-type bed in the back on which to store folded-up lengths of special lightweight racing hose, a custom-made rack upon which special racing ladders can be rested for certain events. There are also usually flat back-steps on the rear of each rig for racers to stand on, as well as D-ring type handles attached to the rear of the racers so that the riders can hold on as they race down the track. Both classes will have modified racing engines, as well as racing slicks in the Class-C division.

== About the tracks ==
The tracks used at Drill Team events are usually built and maintained by individual fire departments, but are designed to strict specifications that are dictated by an overseeing officiating body, which guarantees that there will be exact consistencies from track to track. As a racing season (from June till early September) begins, a schedule will be made up wherein various different fire departments will host the races that will make up that season, usually one each weekend.

A typical track is roughly less than a half mile long. At one end is a staging area, where each of the teams will stage until it is their turn to run the event. As one progresses down the track, there are different starting lines marked out at different distances necessitated by each different event. At a specific distance down the track, on the right-hand side, is a hydrant that during events which require water is maintained at a very specific hydrant pressure, which is usually accomplished by using either a pumphouse or Class-A pumper assigned to that task. At the far end of the track is an arch, usually constructed of wood, steel or brick, that is used for the ladder and bucket-brigade events, and which is also constructed and maintained to very specific standards of the association.

== About the racing events ==
The races have the goal of beating the clock, not only to beat your team's best time in a particular event, but to have the fastest time of all the teams in that event. Statewide records are kept for each event, and in the event that one is potentially broken, officials at the track to convene to inspect the equipment used in running the event, as well as the electronic timing equipment. Points are allotted for each event for First-Place, Second-Place, etc. therefore the team having the most points at the end of the day is declared the Winner of that day's event. At the end of the season, there are County and State championships, which teams covet winning, or at least placing high among the ranks.

=== Hose competitions ===
The hose competitions are broken down into Old-Fashioned and Motorized groups. In the Old-Fashioned competitions, contestants will either run down the track carrying lengths of hose, or pull lengths of hose down the track on a small two-wheeled cart. At the hydrant end, one person has the job of attaching the hose to the hydrant, then waiting to open the hydrant at exactly the right time, timing it so that as the last competitor, who is at the nozzle-end of the hose, reaches the point where the hose is fully extended down the track, the water is just coming to the nozzle tip, at which point the nozzleman aims the water at a flip-up target positioned at the end of the track. As the target gets triggered, the electronic timer stops the clock.

The Motorized version of these events are very similar, except that the racing trucks begin from a starting line at the head of the track, loaded with all the racing team members. After racing down the track a specific distance, the truck either stops at the hydrant (for the Class-B event Motor Pump) to hook up and pump from the hydrant, as other team members run down the track with the nozzle, or (in the case of Class-B and Class-C racers) slows to let off team members to hook up one end of the hose to the hydrant, then races down the track, laying hose as it goes, until it reaches a point where it has to stop again to let off the nozzlemen who continue to hook up the nozzle, then wait for water so that they can hit the target.

=== Ladder competitions ===
The ladder competitions are again broken down into Old-Fashioned and Motorized categories, with the Old-Fashioned teams using the same hose cart to carry a special racing ladder down the length of the track. In these events, the idea is race down the track, and upon reaching a specific point at the end of the track near the wooden arch, pull the ladder off of the cart (or racing truck) so that the ladder foots in such a way that as the ladder is raised - using the momentum of the moving cart or truck - it places the tip at the top of the arch at with the ladder at a certain angle to the arch, and with the tip within a specified area at the top. At this point, as racing team members foot the ladder, one or more team members climb as quickly as possible to the top of the ladder in order to grasp the top ring, at which point the clock is stopped.

There are strict regulations regarding this event. Should the ladder be footed too close or too far from the arch, or if the tip is not in the correct (safety) area at the top of the arch, the team is disqualified for that particular event. This is due to the inherent dangers in raising a ladder at speed.

=== Bucket Brigade competitions ===
The last event of the day is always the Bucket Brigade. Each team member is issued a five-gallon canvas bucket, and after running a specified distance down the track, one by one they dip their buckets into a trough filled with water. The first three or four team members will climb a stationary ladder that has been affixed to the arch, and take positions on the ladder as one by one the other team members hand buckets of water up to them, until the top-most member dumps that bucket of water into a 55-gallon drum that is stationed atop the arch. He then tosses that bucket onto the ground and grabs the next one, empties it, and so forth until the drum is filled up, at which point the clock is stopped.

== Determining Champions ==
The Champions for each season are determined in three methods - County, Area and State champions. The State Championship being the most prestigious and coveted.

=== County Champions ===
County champions are determined as a result of the cumulative number of points earned within a team's County. This is done at the conclusion of each year's schedule, when points are tallied and awards are handed out at the respective Counties Captain's dinner for that year. This is done in Nassau and Suffolk Counties.

=== Area Champions ===
Area champions are determined as a result of the cumulative number of points earned within a team's Area. This is done at the conclusion of each year's schedule, when points are tallied and awards are handed out at the Area's Captain's dinner for that year. This is done for the Western and Northern Areas.

=== State champions ===
At the end of each August the state championship is held on an annually rotating basis through the four divisions of that make up the New York State Drill Team Captain's Association. At this event, more than 30 teams show up for an entire day of racing. At the conclusion of the day, the points which teams have accumulated for winning events are added up to determine the year's State Champion. It is not necessary for the State Champion to also be an area Champion.
