= Nelson (surname) =

Nelson is an English, Scottish, Irish, Northern Irish, Scots-Irish, and Scandinavian surname. It is a patronymic name derived from Nell. The name is also listed as a baptismal name "the son of Eleanor". The name was popularised by Admiral Horatio Nelson as a given name.

Nelson is also an anglicized version of the Scandinavian names Nilsen, Nielsen, and Nilsson. In the United States in 1990, it was ranked as the 39th-most common surname.

== Notable people with the surname "Nelson" include ==
=== A ===
- A. C. Nelson (1864–1913), American educator
- Adam Nelson (born 1975), American shotputter
- Adolph Lincoln Nelson (1888–??), American inventor
- Adolphus Peter Nelson (1872–1927), American politician
- Adriana Nelson (born 1980), American long-distance runner
- Adrienne Nelson (born 1967), American lawyer and judge
- A. J. Nelson (born 1985), Ghanaian recording artist
- Al Nelson (born 1943), American football player
- Al Nelson (sound engineer), American sound engineer
- Alberta Nelson (1937–2006), American actress
- Aleisha-Pearl Nelson (born 1990), New Zealand rugby union player
- Alexander Nelson (born 1988), British sprinter
- Alexander Nelson (British Army officer) (1814–1893), British army officer
- Alexis Nikole Nelson (born 1992), American chef
- Alice Dunbar Nelson (1875–1935), American poet
- Allison Nelson (1822–1862), American politician
- Alondra Nelson (born 1968), American writer
- Amy Nelson (born 1980), American lawyer
- Amy K. Nelson (born 1978), American journalist
- Anne Nelson (born 1954), American journalist
- Antonya Nelson (born 1961), American author
- Armando Melgar Nelson (born 1945), Guatemalan footballer
- Arnett Nelson (1892–1959), American musician
- Arvell Nelson (born 1988), American football player
- Aven Nelson (1859–1952), American botanist
- Avua-Siav Leo Nelson (born 1980), Russian footballer
- Azumah Nelson (born 1958), Ghanaian boxer

=== B ===
- Brian (Big Ting) Nelson (1979-2026), High School Chemistry Teacher
- Baby Face Nelson (1908–1934), American gang member
- Barrie Nelson (1933–2021), Canadian animator
- Battling Nelson (1882–1954), Danish-born American boxer
- Beata Nelson (born 1998), American swimmer
- Bek Nelson (1927–2015), American model
- Benjamin Nelson (1911–1977), American sociologist
- Benny Nelson (born 1941), American football player
- Bertram Nelson (1905–1984), British accountant
- Beryce Nelson (born 1947), Australian politician
- Billie Nelson (1941–1974), British motorcycle racer
- Billy Bass Nelson (1951–2026), American bass guitarist
- Blake Nelson (born 1965), American author
- Boycie Nelson (born 1974), New Zealand rugby league footballer
- Bradley Nelson (born 1962), American robotist
- Brady Nelson (born 1978), American businessman
- Brendan Nelson (born 1958), Australian politician
- Brittany Nelson (born 1984), American artist
- Brock Nelson (born 1991), American ice hockey player
- Brooklyn Nelson (born 2004), American actress
- Bryan Nelson (born 1958), American politician
- Bryant Nelson (born 1974), American baseball player
- Buck Nelson (1895–1982), American farmer
- Byron Nelson (1912–2006), American golfer

=== C ===
- Caleb Nelson (born 1966), American law professor
- Caleb Azumah Nelson (born 1993), British-Ghanaian writer
- Camille A. Nelson (born 1968), Canadian-Jamaican law professor
- Candace Nelson (born 1974), American chef
- Candy Nelson (1849–1910), American baseball player
- Carey Nelson (born 1963), Canadian long-distance runner
- Carla Nelson (born 1957), American politician
- Carly Nelson (born 1998), American soccer player
- Caroline Nelson (1868–1952), Danish-American activist
- Carter Nelson (born 2005), American football player
- Cary Nelson (born 1946), American professor
- Casey Nelson (born 1992), American ice hockey player
- Catherine Nelson (born 1987), Northern Irish politician
- Celeste Nelson (born 1976), American scientist
- Charmaine Nelson (born 1971), Canadian curator
- Cindy Nelson (born 1955), American alpine skier
- Cindy Nelson (actress), Australian actress
- Cirilo Nelson (1938–2020), Honduran botanist
- Clair Nelson (1940–2019), American politician
- Cleland Kinloch Nelson (1852–1917), American bishop
- Cody Nelson (born 1988), Australian rugby league player
- Cole Nelson (born 1997), Canadian American football player
- Colette Nelson (born 1974), American bodybuilder
- Colleen Nelson, Australian scientist
- Conrad Nelson (born 1964), British actor
- Cordner Nelson (1918–2009), American publisher
- Corey Nelson (born 1992), American football player
- Corky Nelson (1939–2014), American football player and coach
- Craig Richard Nelson (1947–2025), American actor
- Craig T. Nelson (born 1944), American actor

=== D ===
- Dale Nelson (1939–1999), Canadian murderer
- Dana D. Nelson (born 1962), American English professor
- Daniel Nelson, various people
- Darby Nelson (1940–2022), American writer and politician
- Darrin Nelson (born 1959), American football player
- Daryl Nelson (born 1934), Australian rules footballer
- Debbie Nelson (1955–2024), American author, mother of rapper Eminem
- Deborah Nelson (born 1962), American journalist
- Deborah L. Nelson (born 1962), American academic
- DeMarcus Nelson (born 1985), Serbian-American basketball player
- Derrie Nelson (born 1958), American football player
- Diane Nelson (businesswoman) (born 1968), American business executive
- Dianne Nelson (born 1954), American writer
- Don Nelson (1940–2026), American basketball player, coach, and executive
- Donnie Nelson (born 1962), American basketball executive; son of Don
- Dorothea Nelson (1903–1994), American librarian
- Dorothyann Nelson, American figure skater
- Douglas Nelson (born 1959), American judoka
- Duke Nelson (1907–1989), American athletic administrator
- Dwight Nelson (born 1952), Japanese-American pastor
- Dwight Nelson (politician) (1946–2018), Jamaican politician

=== E ===
- Earle Nelson (1897–1928), American serial killer
- Eddie J. Nelson, American sound engineer
- Edith M. Nelson (1889–1942), American librarian
- Edna Lillian Nelson (1896–1948), Australian doctor
- Edor Nelson (1914–2014), American athlete
- Eldon Nelson (1927–2012), American jockey
- Edward William Nelson (1855–1934), American naturalist and ethnologist
- Elimu Nelson (born 1973), American actor
- Eliza Nelson (born 1956), Indian field hockey player
- Elmer C. Nelson (1900–1975), American politician
- Emily Nelson (born 1996), English cyclist
- Emmett Nelson (1905–1967), American baseball player
- Erich Nelson (1897–1980), German artist
- Erven T. Nelson (born 1956), American lawyer and politician
- Esther Nelson (1810–1843), Manx poet
- Evelyn Nelson (1899–1923), American actress
- Evelyn Nelson (mathematician) (1943–1987), Canadian mathematician
- Everett Nelson, American baseball player

=== F ===
- Frances Nelson (1758–1831), English public figure
- Frances Nelson (actress) (1892–1975), American actress
- Franklin Nelson (1933–2019), American figure skater
- Fraser Nelson (born 1973), British journalist
- Fred Nelson (1934–2018), Australian rugby league footballer
- Frederick Nelson (1932–2009), American engineering professor

=== G ===
- Gail S. Nelson (born 1959), American mathematician
- Garnett Nelson (1872–1930), American football coach
- Garrett Nelson (born 2000), American football player
- Garry Nelson (born 1961), English footballer
- Gaylord Nelson (1916–2005), American politician
- Gene Nelson (1920–1996), American dancer
- Gene Nelson (baseball) (born 1960), American baseball player
- Gerald Nelson (born 1941), South African cricketer
- Gil Nelson (born 1949), American botanist
- Glen Nelson, American poet
- G. Lynn Nelson (1937–2014), American author
- G. M. Nelson (1899–1983), American politician
- Gord Nelson (born 1947), Canadian ice hockey player
- Gordon M. Nelson (1941–1993), American political activist
- Graham Nelson (born 1968), British mathematician and poet
- Grant Nelson (disambiguation), multiple people
- Gray Nelson (1927–2022), New Zealand public servant
- Gunvor Nelson (1931–2025), Swedish filmmaker and artist
- Guy Nelson (1900–1969), English cricketer
- G. W. Nelson, American politician
- Gwen Nelson (1901–1990), English actress

=== H ===
- Hank Nelson (1937–2012), Australian historian
- Harriet Nelson (1909–1994), American singer
- Harris Nelson (1835–1883), Australian businessman and politician
- Harvey Frans Nelson Jr. (1924–2021), American diplomat
- Havelock Nelson (1917–1996), Irish composer
- Havelock Nelson (writer) (born 1964), Guyanese journalist
- Haywood Nelson (born 1960), American actor
- H. C. Nelson (1886–1939), American politician
- Helena Nelson (born 1953), Scottish poet
- Herm Nelson (born 1961), American racewalker
- H. G. P. Nelson (1932–2001), Sri Lankan politician
- Hilaree Nelson (born 1972), American ski mountaineer
- Holly Nelson, Canadian writer and activist
- Horace Nelson (1878–1962), American politician
- Horatia Nelson (1801–1881), British public figure
- Hub Nelson (1907–1981), American ice hockey player

=== I ===
- Ira Schreiber Nelson (1912–1965), American botanist
- Irene Nelson (born 1962), Russian recording artist
- Isaac Nelson (1809–1888), Irish politician and minister
- Isaac De Groff Nelson (1810–1891), American politician
- Ivory V. Nelson (born 1934), American educator
- Izaiyah Nelson (born 2003), American basketball player

=== J ===
- Jackson Nelson (born 1996), Australian rules footballer
- Jacob Broughton Nelson (1898–?), American fraternity founder
- Jacqui Nelson (born 1965), New Zealand cyclist
- Jameer Nelson (born 1982), American basketball player
- Jamie Nelson (born 1959), American baseball player
- Jamie Lindemann Nelson (born 1954), American philosopher
- Jan Nelson (born 1955), Australian artist
- Janai Nelson (born 1971), American lawyer
- Jandy Nelson (born 1965), American author
- Jane Nelson (born 1951), American politician
- Janet Nelson (1942–2024), British historian
- Jason Nelson (poet) (born 1981), American poet
- Jason Nelson (musician) (born 1974), American musician
- Jaxon Nelson (born 2000), American ice hockey player
- Jay Nelson (born 1970), American video editor
- Jayden Nelson (born 2002), Canadian soccer player
- Jenny Nelson, British physics professor
- Jeremiah Nelson (1769–1838), American politician
- Jeremy Nelson, American visual artist
- Jermy Nelson (born 1994), Jamaican footballer
- Jerry Nelson (1934–2012), American puppeteer
- Jerry Nelson (astronomer) (1944–2017), American astronomer
- Jesy Nelson (born 1991), British singer
- Jez Nelson (born 1964), British radio broadcaster
- Jill Nelson (born 1952), American journalist
- J. J. Nelson (born 1992), American football player
- Joan Nelson (born 1958), American visual artist
- Joanna Nelson, American ecologist
- Jock Nelson (1908–1991), Australian politician
- Joe Nelson (born 1974), American baseball player
- Joel Nelson (born 1945), American poet
- Johnny Nelson (born 1967), British boxer
- Jordy Nelson (born 1985), American football player
- Jorel Nelson (born 1992), American professional wrestler
- Josh Nelson (born 1978), American pianist
- Josie Nelson (born 2002), English cyclist
- Juanita Morrow Nelson (1923–2015), American activist
- Judd Nelson (born 1959), American actor
- Judith Nelson (1939–2012), American soprano
- Judy Nelson, American author and social figure
- Julia Bullard Nelson (1842–1914), American activist
- Julia D. Nelson (1863–1936), American politician
- Julio Jorge Nelson (1913–1976), Argentine musician
- Justin L. Nelson (born 1978), American Army Veteran
- Justus Henry Nelson (1850–1937), American missionary

=== K ===
- Kameron Nelson (gymnast), American gymnast
- Kameron Nelson (politician), American politician
- Karen Nelson (athlete) (born 1963), Canadian hurler
- Karen E. Nelson, Jamaican-American microbiologist
- Karl Nelson (born 1960), American football player
- Katherine Nelson (1930–2018), American psychologist
- Katherine Greacen Nelson (1913–1982), American geologist
- Kay Nelson (1909–2003), American costume designer
- Kemba Nelson (born 2000), Jamaican sprinter
- Kemi Nelson (1956–2022), Nigerian politician
- Kent C. Nelson, American businessman
- Kim Nelson (1958–2015), Australian artist
- Kim L. Nelson (born 1948), American politician
- Kins Nelson (born 1973), Sri Lankan politician
- Kirsten Nelson (born 1970), American actress
- Knox Nelson (1926–1996), American politician
- Knuckles Nelson (born 1963), American professional wrestler
- Knute Nelson (1843–1923), American politician
- Kristin Nelson (1945–2018), American painter and author

=== L ===
- Lacey Nelson (born 2010), British monarch
- Larry Nelson (born 1947), American golfer
- Lars Nelson (born 1985), Swedish skier
- Lauren Nelson (born 1986), American beauty queen
- Lauritz Nelson (1860–1941), Norwegian-American sailor
- Lawrie Nelson (born 1943), Australian racing driver
- Lefty Nelson, American baseball player
- Lemrick Nelson (born 1975), American criminal
- Lennart Nelson (1918–2006), Swedish weightlifter
- Leonard Nelson (1882–1927), German mathematician and philosopher
- Léone Boudreau-Nelson (1915–2004), American-born Canadian phonetician
- Levi B. Nelson (1838–1903), American politician
- Lew A. Nelson, American test pilot
- Lianne Nelson (born 1972), American rower
- Lindsey Nelson (1919–1995), American sportscaster
- Lisa Nelson (born 1949), American artist
- Lloyd S. Nelson (1922–2013), American statistician
- Logan Nelson (born 1996), American composer
- Lonnie Nelson (1932–2014), American activist
- Lori Nelson (1933–2020), American actress
- Louie Nelson (born 1951), American basketball player
- Lowell A. Nelson (1918–1986), American politician
- Lyle Nelson (born 1949), American biathlete

=== M ===
- Madison Nelson (1803–1870), justice of the Maryland Court of Appeals
- Maggie Nelson (born 1973), American writer
- Malachi Nelson (born 2004), American football player
- Marc Nelson (born 1971), American singer-songwriter
- Marc Saw Nelson (born 1972), Burmese-Australian television host
- Marilyn Nelson (born 1946), American author and poet
- Marjorie Nelson (1923–2010), American actress
- Marshall Nelson (born 1994), Australian-Belgian basketball player
- Martin A. Nelson (1889–1979), American lawyer and judge
- Maud Nelson (1881–1944), American baseball player
- Marvin Nelson (born 1958), American politician
- Maximo Nelson (born 1982), Dominican baseball player
- Mel Nelson (1936–2021), American baseball player
- Melissa K. Nelson, American indigenous activist
- Merle Nelson (born 1935), American politician
- Merrill Nelson (born 1955), American politician
- Mervyn Nelson (??–1991), American actor
- Michael A. Nelson (1937–2024), Lieutenant General in the United States Air Force
- Mickaël Nelson (born 1990), French footballer
- Midge Nelson (born 1937), Australian softball player
- Mikiela Nelson (born 1997), Canadian rugby union footballer
- Mimi Nelson (1922–1999), Swedish actress
- M.O. Nelson (1921–2021), Canadian businessman
- Morley Nelson (1916–2005), American falconer and educator
- Murry R. Nelson (born 1947), American professor

=== N ===
- Napoleon Nelson, American politician
- Nathan Nelson (biochemist) (born 1938), Israeli biologist
- Nathan Nelson (politician), American politician
- Neal Nelson, American basketball coach
- Ned Nelson (1911–1977), American baseball and basketball player
- Neil Nelson, American Marine general
- Nici Nelson, English anthropologist
- Nicholas Nelson (Jamaican footballer) (born 1998), Jamaican footballer
- Nicholas H. Nelson (??–1874), American politician
- Niecee Nelson (born 1979), American basketball coach
- Nihal Nelson (1946–2022), Sri Lankan vocalist
- Nikki Nelson (born 1969), American singer
- Niles Nelson (born 1938), American football coach
- Nirith Nelson (born 1968), Israeli artist
- N. O. Nelson (1844–1922), American businessman
- Noel Nelson (born 1967), Irish cricketer
- Norm Nelson (1923–1988), American stock car driver
- Norman Nelson (born 1983), South African rugby union footballer
- Novella Nelson (1939–2017), American actress

=== O ===
- O. B. Nelson (1850–1922), Danish-American politician
- Olaf Frederick Nelson (1883–1944), Samoan businessman and politician
- Olive Nelson (1911–1970), Samoan barrister
- Olive Nelson Russell (1905–1989), American composer, organist and pianist
- Oliver Nelson (1932–1975), American jazz musician
- Oliver E. Nelson Jr. (1920–2001), American plant geneticist
- Omaima Nelson (born 1968), Egyptian-American model
- Oscar Nelson (1874–1951), American politician
- Oscar Frederick Nelson (1881–1951), American naval officer
- Otto L. Nelson Jr. (1902–1985), American soldier
- Ozzie Nelson (1906–1975), American actor

=== P ===
- Packie Nelson (1907–1992), American football player
- Pam Nelson (born 1946), American politician
- Pamela Nelson, American artist
- Paula Nelson (born 1969), American singer
- Phillip Nelson (born 1929), American economic professor
- Phyllis Nelson (1950–1998), American singer
- Picasso Nelson (born 1973), American football player
- Polly Nelson (born 1952), American attorney
- Polycarpus Nelson (1680–1738), English landowner
- Portia Nelson (1920–2001), American singer-songwriter
- Prince Nelson (1958–2016), American singer-songwriter

=== Q ===
- Quenton Nelson (born 1996), American football player

=== R ===
- Ralph Nelson (1916–1987), American film director
- Ralph Nelson (American football) (born 1954), American football player
- Raymond Nels Nelson (1921–1981), American newspaper editor
- Rebecca J. Nelson (born 1961), American biologist
- Red Nelson (baseball) (1886–1956), American baseball player
- Red Nelson (musician) (1907–1970), American singer
- Reeves Nelson (born 1991), American basketball player
- Reggie Nelson (born 1983), American football player
- Reggie Nelson (offensive tackle) (born 1976), American football player
- Reiss Nelson (born 1999), English footballer
- Rensselaer Nelson (1826–1904), American judge
- Reuben N. Nelson (1904–1966), American lawyer and politician
- Rex Nelson, American sports broadcaster
- Rhett Nelson (born 1980), American football player
- Rick Nelson (politician) (born 1954), member of the Kentucky House of Representatives
- Ricky Nelson (1940–1985), American singer-songwriter
- Ricky Nelson (baseball) (1959–2021), American baseball player and manager
- Riki R. Nelson, American artist
- Riley Nelson (born 1977), Canadian ice hockey player
- R. Kenton Nelson (born 1954), American painter
- Rob Nelson (born 1979), American biologist and documentary filmmaker
- Rocky Nelson (1924–2006), American baseball player
- Roland Nelson (1881–1940), English barrister
- Romeo Nelson (1902–1974), American pianist
- Rony Nelson (born 1989), American football player
- Rosemary Nelson (1958–1999), Irish human rights solicitor
- Russ Nelson (born 1958), American computer scientist
- Russell M. Nelson (1924–2025), American religious leader and surgeon
- Ryan Nelson (born 2012), Famous british king
- Ryan D. Nelson (born 1973), American judge
- Ryne Nelson (born 1998), American baseball player

=== S ===
- Sa'eed Nelson (born 1998), American basketball player
- Sam Nelson (1896–1963), American film director
- Sammy Nelson (born 1949), Northern Ireland footballer
- Samuel Nelson (1792–1873), American attorney and judge
- Sandra Nelson (born 1964), American actress
- Sandra Nelson (politician) (born 1971), American politician
- Sandy Nelson (1938–2022), American drummer
- Sandy Nelson (footballer), Australian rules footballer
- Sarah Jane Nelson, American actress
- Sarah Milledge Nelson (1931–2020), American archaeologist
- Scott Nelson (born 1969), New Zealand race walker
- Scott Reynolds Nelson (born 1964), American history professor
- SD Nelson (born 1950), American illustrator
- Sean Nelson (born 1973), American singer
- Sean Nelson (actor) (born 1980), American actor
- Seth Iredell Nelson (1809–1905), American pioneer
- Shara Nelson (born 1965), English singer-songwriter
- Sharon Nelson, American politician
- Shaun Nelson (born 1973), Australian politician
- Sheffield Nelson (born 1941), American attorney
- Sheila Nelson (1936–2020), English violin and viola teacher
- Sheila Nelson (politician), American politician
- Shelley Nelson, English singer-songwriter
- Shimona Nelson (born 1998), Jamaican netball player
- Shirley Nelson (1925–2022), American author
- Shirley Collie Nelson (1931–2010), American singer
- Sid Nelson (born 1996), English footballer
- Sidney Nelson (1800–1862), English composer
- Simeon Nelson (born 1964), Australian sculptor
- Simon Nelson (1931–2017), American murderer
- Socrates Nelson (1814–1867), American politician and businessman
- Sonny Boy Nelson (1908–1998), American musician
- Sophia A. Nelson (born 1967), American journalist
- Soraya Sarhaddi Nelson, American journalist
- Spencer Nelson (born 1980), American-Azerbaijani basketball player
- Spike Nelson (1906–1998), American football player and coach
- Stace Nelson (born 1967), American politician
- Stacey Nelson (born 1987), American softball player
- Stan Nelson (born 1939), Canadian politician
- Stanley Nelson Jr. (born 1951), American documentary filmmaker
- Steady Nelson (1913–1988), American musician
- Stephen Nelson (sportscaster) (born 1989), American sportscaster
- Stephen L. Nelson (born 1959), American author
- Steven Nelson (born 1993), American football player
- Stewart Nelson, American mathematician and programmer
- Stuart Nelson (born 1981), English footballer
- Sue Nelson (born 1961), British writer
- Susan B. Nelson (1927–2003), American environmental activist
- Susan Richard Nelson (born 1952), American lawyer and judge
- Syd Nelson (1932–2021), American politician

=== T ===
- Tara Nelson, Canadian television journalist
- Tasha Nelson (born 1974), American alpine skier
- Taylor Nelson (born 1988), Canadian ice hockey player
- Ted Nelson (born 1937), American pioneer of information technology, philosopher, and sociologist
- Ted Nelson (track and field) (born 1943), American track and field athlete and coach
- Ted S. Nelson (1935–2025), Guamanian politician
- Teddy Nelson (1939–1992), Norwegian singer
- Telena Cruz Nelson (born 1980), Guamanian politician
- Tex Nelson (1936–2011), American baseball player
- Thérèse Nelson, American chef
- Thor Nelson (born 1968), American ice hockey player
- Tia Nelson (born 1956), American activist
- Timna Nelson-Levy (born 1994), Israeli Olympic judoka
- Tori Nelson (born 1976), American boxer
- Trapper Nelson (1909–1968), American trapper
- Travis Nelson (politician), American politician
- Travis Nelson (actor) (born 1990), Canadian actor
- Trevor Nelson (born 1964), British disc jockey
- Truman J. Nelson (1911–1987), American writer
- Tyka Nelson (born 1960), American singer
- Tyrone Nelson (born 1985), American basketball player

=== V ===
- Valentine Nelson (born 1987), Papua New Guinean footballer
- Van Nelson (born 1945), American long-distance runner
- Victor Folke Nelson (1898–1939), Swedish-American writer
- Vinceroy Nelson (born 1996), Kittitian footballer
- Violet Nelson, Canadian actress
- Vita Nelson, American publisher

=== W ===
- Waldo Nelson (1898–1997), American pediatrician
- Wallace Nelson (1856–1943), Australian politician
- Wallwood Nelson (1884–??), Jamaican cricketer
- Wally Nelson (1909–2002), American civil rights activist
- Walter Nelson (1932–1962), American guitarist
- Warren Nelson (born 1950), American entrepreneur
- Wayne Nelson (born 1950), American musician
- Wes Nelson (born 1998), English television personality
- W. Grant Nelson (1869–1946), American politician
- Wilbur Nelson (1910–2003), American radio broadcaster
- Willie Nelson (born 1933), American singer
- Wolfred Nelson (1791–1863), Canadian politician

=== Y ===
- Yvonne Nelson (born 1985), Ghanaian actress

=== Z ===
- Zach Nelson (born 1961), American business executive
- Zion Nelson (born 2001), American football player
- Zita Nelson, Spanish-Argentine soprano

== Disambiguation pages ==
=== A ===
- Alan Nelson (disambiguation)
- Albert Nelson (disambiguation)
- Alfred Nelson (disambiguation)
- Andrew Nelson (disambiguation)
- Ann Nelson (disambiguation)
- Anthony Nelson (disambiguation)
- Arthur Nelson (disambiguation)
- Ashleigh Nelson (disambiguation)

=== B ===
- Barry Nelson (disambiguation)
- Ben Nelson (disambiguation)
- Bert Nelson (disambiguation)
- Bill Nelson (disambiguation)
- Bob Nelson (disambiguation)
- Bobby Nelson (disambiguation)
- Brad Nelson (disambiguation)
- Brett Nelson (disambiguation)
- Brian Nelson (disambiguation)
- Bruce Nelson (disambiguation)

=== C ===
- Candice Nelson (disambiguation)
- Carl Nelson (disambiguation)
- Carolyn Nelson (disambiguation)
- Charles Nelson (disambiguation)
- Chris Nelson (disambiguation)
- Christopher Nelson (disambiguation)
- Colin Nelson (disambiguation)
- Craig Nelson (disambiguation)

=== D ===
- Daniel Nelson (disambiguation)
- Drew Nelson (disambiguation)
- David Nelson (disambiguation)
- Dennis Nelson (disambiguation)
- Don Nelson (disambiguation)
- Donna Nelson (disambiguation)
- Dorothy Nelson (disambiguation)

=== E ===
- Earl Nelson (disambiguation)
- Ed Nelson (disambiguation)
- Edmund Nelson (disambiguation)
- Edward Nelson (disambiguation)
- Edwin Nelson (disambiguation)
- Eric Nelson (disambiguation)
- Erik Nelson (disambiguation)
- Ernest Nelson (disambiguation)

=== F ===
- Francis Nelson (disambiguation)
- Frank Nelson (disambiguation)

=== G ===
- Gary Nelson (disambiguation)
- George Nelson (disambiguation)
- Grant Nelson (disambiguation)
- Greg Nelson (disambiguation)
- Gregory Nelson (disambiguation)
- Gunnar Nelson (disambiguation)

=== H ===
- Harold Nelson (disambiguation)
- Harry Nelson (disambiguation)
- Helen Nelson (disambiguation)
- Henry Nelson (disambiguation)
- H. G. Nelson (disambiguation)
- Homer Nelson (disambiguation)
- Horatio Nelson (disambiguation)
- Howard Nelson (disambiguation)
- Hubert Nelson (disambiguation)
- Hugh Nelson (disambiguation)

=== I ===
- Ian Nelson (disambiguation)

=== J ===
- Jack Nelson (disambiguation)
- James Nelson (disambiguation)
- Jeff Nelson (disambiguation)
- Jennifer Nelson (disambiguation)
- Jessica Nelson (disambiguation)
- Jessie Nelson (disambiguation)
- Jim Nelson (disambiguation)
- Jimmy Nelson (disambiguation)
- John Nelson (disambiguation)
- Jon Nelson (disambiguation)
- Jonathan Nelson (disambiguation)
- Joseph Nelson (disambiguation)
- Joshua Nelson (disambiguation)
- Julie Nelson (disambiguation)

=== K ===
- Keith Nelson (disambiguation)
- Ken Nelson (disambiguation)
- Kenneth Nelson (disambiguation)
- Kyle Nelson (disambiguation)

=== L ===
- Lee Nelson (disambiguation)
- Louis Nelson (disambiguation)
- Luke Nelson (disambiguation)

=== M ===
- Mark Nelson (disambiguation)
- Martha Nelson (disambiguation)
- Mary Nelson (disambiguation)
- Matt Nelson (disambiguation)
- Michael Nelson (disambiguation)
- Miriam Nelson (disambiguation)

=== N ===
- Nels Nelson (disambiguation)
- Nick Nelson (disambiguation)

=== P ===
- Patrick Nelson (disambiguation)
- Paul Nelson (disambiguation)
- Peter Nelson (disambiguation)
- Philip Nelson (disambiguation)

=== R ===
- Ray Nelson (disambiguation)
- Richard Nelson (disambiguation)
- Robert Nelson (disambiguation)
- Roger Nelson (disambiguation)
- Ron Nelson (disambiguation)
- Roy Nelson (disambiguation)
- Russell Nelson (disambiguation)
- Ruth Nelson (disambiguation)

=== S ===
- Sara Nelson (disambiguation)
- Shane Nelson (disambiguation)
- Shawn Nelson (disambiguation)
- Steve Nelson (disambiguation)

=== T ===
- Ted Nelson (disambiguation)
- Terry Nelson (disambiguation)
- Thomas Nelson (disambiguation)
- Tim Nelson (disambiguation)
- Todd Nelson (disambiguation)
- Tony Nelson (disambiguation)
- Tracy Nelson (disambiguation)
- Tyler Nelson (disambiguation)

=== W ===
- Wendy Nelson (disambiguation)
- William Nelson (disambiguation)

== Lists of Nelsons by title ==
- Admiral Nelson (disambiguation), a disambiguation page for Admirals surnamed "Nelson"
- General Nelson (disambiguation), a disambiguation page for Generals surnamed "Nelson"
- Governor Nelson (disambiguation), a disambiguation page for Governors surnamed "Nelson"
- Judge Nelson (disambiguation), a disambiguation page for Judges surnamed "Nelson"
- Justice Nelson (disambiguation), a disambiguation page for Justices surnamed "Nelson"
- Lady Nelson (disambiguation), a disambiguation page for Ladies surnamed "Nelson"
- Lord Nelson (disambiguation), a disambiguation page for Lords surnamed "Nelson"
- Major Nelson (disambiguation), a disambiguation page for Majors surnamed "Nelson"
- Senator Nelson (disambiguation), a disambiguation page for Senators surnamed "Nelson"

== Fictional characters ==
- Alice Nelson (The Brady Bunch), a character in the show The Brady Bunch
- Brody Nelson, a character in the show CSI: Cyber
- Christine Nelson, a character in the Degrassi franchise
- Foggy Nelson, a character in series Marvel Comics
- Storm Nelson, a character in the British comic strip Eagle
- Victoria "Vicki" Nelson, a character in the book Blood Price
- Nick Nelson, a character in the graphic novel and Netflix show Heartstopper

== See also ==
- Nelson (disambiguation)
- Nelson (given name), people with the given name "Nelson"
- Neilson (name), people with the surname "Neilson"
- Clan MacNeil, a family with the surname "MacNeil"
