= Major Nelson =

Major Nelson may refer to:

- David Nelson (VC) (1887–1918), Irish recipient of the Victoria Cross, holding the rank of major
- Major Anthony "Tony" Nelson, a character from I Dream of Jeannie portrayed by actor Larry Hagman
- Larry Hryb, nicknamed "Major Nelson", Director of Community for Unity Technologies

== See also ==
- Nelson (surname)
- General Nelson (disambiguation), Generals named Nelson some of whom were previously Majors
- Major (disambiguation)
- Nelson (disambiguation)
