= Sara Nelson =

Sara or Sarah Nelson may refer to:

- Sara Nelson (editor) (fl. 2000s–2010s), American publishing industry figure
- Sara Nelson (union leader) (born 1973), International President of the Association of Flight Attendants-CWA, AFL-CIO
- Sara Nelson (politician), member of the Seattle City Council
- Sarah Milledge Nelson (1931–2020), American archaeologist and professor
- Sarah Jane Nelson, American actress, singer and songwriter
