= Bruce Nelson =

Bruce Nelson may refer to:

- Bruce Nelson (historian) (1940–2022), historian and labor scholar at Dartmouth College
- Bruce Nelson (naval architect), yacht designer for the America One challenge
- Bruce Nelson (businessman) (born 1944), chief executive officer of Office Depot
- Bruce Nelson (American football) (born 1979), University of Iowa football player drafted by the Carolina Panthers in the 2003 NFL Draft
- Bruce Jay Nelson (1952–1999), inventor of the remote procedure call for computer communications
