= Carl Nelson =

Carl Nelson may refer to:

- Carl Nelson (wrestler), Danish Greco-Roman wrestler
- Carl Gustaf Nelson (1898–1988), American painter
- Carl M. Nelson (1892–1962), member of the Wisconsin State Assembly
- Carl T. Nelson (1900–1978), American football player and coach

== See also ==
- Karl Nelson, former American football player
- Carl Nielsen (disambiguation)
- Carl E. Nelson House, a historic house in Salem, Oregon, USA
