= Governor Nelson =

Governor Nelson may refer to:

- Ben Nelson (born 1941), 37th Governor of Nebraska
- Gaylord Nelson (1916–2005), 35th Governor of Wisconsin
- Knute Nelson (1843–1923), 12th Governor of Minnesota
- Thomas Nelson Jr. (1738–1789), 4th Governor of Virginia, son of William Nelson.
- William Nelson (governor) (1711–1772), Governor of colonial Virginia from 1770 to 1771

== See also ==
- Nelson (surname)
- Governor (disambiguation)
- Nelson (disambiguation)
