= Joseph Nelson =

Joseph Nelson may refer to:

- Joseph Nelson (architect) (1876–1952), American architect
- Joseph Bryan Nelson (1932–2015), British ornithologist
- Joseph S. Nelson (1937–2011), American ichthyologist
- Joe Nelson (born 1974), American baseball player
- Joe Nelson (basketball) (1927–2009), American basketball player
- Joe Nelson (wrestler), English freestyle sport wrestler
