= Grant Nelson =

Grant Nelson may refer to:

- Grant Nelson (basketball) (born 2002), American basketball player
- Grant Nelson (DJ) (born 1971), British disc jockey and producer
- Grant S. Nelson (born 1939), American professor
