= Edith M. Nelson =

American Deaf librarian

- Born: September 26, 1889; St. Paul Minnesota
- Died: April 20, 1942 (aged 52); Nevada City, California
- Occupation: librarian

Edith Mabel Nelson (September 26, 1889 – April 20, 1942) was a librarian known for being the first Deaf woman in the Gallaudet Hall of Fame, and the last Deaf library director at Gallaudet University.

Nelson taught at several schools for the Deaf after graduation, in St. John Canada, St. Augustine, Florida and finally in Washington D. C. working at the Kendall School. She was appointed as a librarian to Gallaudet in 1919 and worked there for the rest of her life, though a 1921 directory of special libraries also shows her working at the Columbia Institution for the Deaf library which was Gallaudet's corporate name at the time. In 1927 the American Library Association's Board of Education for Librarianship believed she was the only educator teaching library methods to deaf students calling her work "pioneering."

In addition to her work in the library, she also taught Latin, mathematics and occasionally gymnastics. She became assistant professor of library science in 1931 and full professor in 1939. Nelson was elected to the board of directors of the Convention of American Instructors of the Deaf. She had a lifetime membership in the American Library Association. She was also a member of Phi Kappa Zeta (OWLS), the national president of the alumnae OWLS, and president of the District of Columbia chapter.

Nelson also enjoyed road trips and would cross the country in her automobile on vacations to visit family, often visiting National Parks and schools for the deaf along the way.

== Early life and education ==
Nelson was born on September 26, 1889, to Hakad Nelson and Bertha Nelson who were originally from Sweden. She became totally deaf at the age of four. Her parents were farmers who spoke Swedish at home. Nelson credited mail-order catalogs for helping her learn English.

She attended the School for the Deaf at Faribault, and the Wisconsin School at Delavan, finally attending School at Berkeley, where she graduated. She attended Gallaudet College for undergraduate and graduate school, receiving an M.A. in 1915. She did coursework in typewriting, business practice and library science at Columbia University, often advocating for her inclusion in classes of hearing students because of her exceptional lip reading skills. She retired from Gallaudet in March 1942 and died of cancer at the home of her sister on April 20, 1942. Her papers are held by Gallaudet.
