= General Nelson =

General Nelson may refer to:

- Alexander Nelson (British Army officer) (1814–1893), British Army lieutenant general
- Allison Nelson (1822–1862), Confederate States Army brigadier general
- John Nelson (British Army officer) (1912–1993), British Army major general
- Neil Nelson (fl. 1980s–2020s), U.S. Marine Corps major general
- Nels H. Nelson (1903–1973), U.S. Marine Corps major general
- Otto L. Nelson Jr. (1902–1985), U.S. Army major general
- Patrick Henry Nelson (1824–1864), Confederate States Army militia major general
- Roger Nelson (politician) (1759–1815), Society of the Cincinnati brigadier general
- Thomas Nelson Jr. (1738–1789), Lower Virginia Militia brigadier general
- William "Bull" Nelson (1824–1862), Union Army major general

== See also ==
- Alfred Nelson-Williams, Major-General in the Republic of Sierra Leone
- Nelson (surname)
- Admiral Nelson (disambiguation)
- General (disambiguation)
- Nelson (disambiguation)
