= Howard Nelson =

Howard Nelson may refer to:

- Howard Nelson (ecologist), Trinidadian ecologist and wildlife biologist
- Howard Nelson (actor) (1934–2007), English film actor
- Howard I. Nelson (1912–2008), American businessman and politician
