= Ernest Nelson =

Ernest Nelson may refer to:

- E. Charles Nelson (born 1951), botanist
- Ernest D. Nelson (1897–1961), politician
- Ernie Nelson (1874–1915), Australian rules footballer who played with South Melbourne
