= Brian Nelson =

Brian Nelson may refer to:

- Brian Nelson (screenwriter) (born 1964), American screenwriter and producer
- Brian Nelson (Northern Irish loyalist) (1947–2003), chief of intelligence for the Ulster Defence Association
- Brian Nelson (literature professor) (born 1946), literature professor, author and translator of French literature
- Brian E. Nelson, lawyer and government official

== See also ==
- Bryan Nelson (born 1958), member of the Florida House of Representatives
- Bryan Nelson (ornithologist) (1932–2015), British ornithologist and academic
