= Senator Nelson =

Senator Nelson may refer to:

== Members of the Northern Irish Senate ==
- Thomas Nelson (Northern Ireland politician) (1888–1954), Northern Irish Senator from 1945 to 1949

== Members of the United States Senate ==
- Arthur E. Nelson (1892–1955), U.S. Senator from Minnesota from 1942 to 1943
- Ben Nelson (born 1941), U.S. Senator from Nebraska from 2001 to 2013
- Bill Nelson (born 1942), U.S. Senator from Florida from 2001 to 2019
- Gaylord Nelson (1916–2005), U.S. Senator from Wisconsin from 1963 to 1981
- Knute Nelson (1843–1923), U.S. Senator from Minnesota from 1895 to 1923; also served in the Minnesota State Senate

== United States state senate members ==
- Arlene Nelson (1925–2017), Nebraska State Senate
- Carla Nelson (born 1957), Minnesota State Senate
- Carolyn Nelson (politician) (born 1937), North Dakota State Senate
- David Nelson (Oregon politician) (born 1941), Oregon State Senate
- Earl E. Nelson (1937–2016), Michigan State Senate
- Gary A. Nelson (born 1930s), Washington State Senate
- Henry C. Nelson (1836–1909), New York State Senate
- Homer Augustus Nelson (1829–1891), New York State Senate
- Howard I. Nelson (1912–2008), Minnesota State Senate
- Hugh Nelson (Virginia politician) (1768–1836), Virginia State Senate
- Jane Nelson (born 1951), Texas State Senate
- John B. Nelson (born 1936), Arizona State Senate
- John E. Nelson (Nebraska politician) (born 1935), Nebraska State Senate
- Pam Nelson (born 1946), South Dakota State Senate
- Philip Nelson (Wisconsin politician) (1891–?), Wisconsin State Senate
- Roger Nelson (politician) (1759–1815), Maryland State Senate
- Sharon Nelson, Washington State Senate
- Socrates Nelson (1814–1867), Minnesota State Senate
- William Nelson (Wisconsin politician) (1839–1913), Wisconsin State Senate

== Others ==
- Ted S. Nelson (born 1935), Senator from Guam
- Telena Cruz Nelson (born 1980), Senator from Guam

== See also ==
- Ancher Nelsen (1904–1992), Minnesota State Senate
- Nelson (surname)
