= Arthur Nelson =

Arthur Nelson may refer to:

- Arthur E. Nelson (1892–1955), American lawyer and politician
- Arthur Nelson (footballer) (1909–1977), English footballer
- Arthur Nelson (Australian politician) (1845–1913), New South Wales politician
- Arthur C. Nelson, American urban planner, researcher and academic
