= Julie Nelson =

Julie Nelson may refer to:

- Julie A. Nelson (born 1956), American economist
- Julie Nelson (news anchor) (born 1971), American news anchor
- Julie Nelson (footballer) (born 1985), Northern Irish footballer
