= Nels Nelson =

Nels Nelson may refer to:

- Nels C. Nelson (1875–1964), Danish-American archaeologist
- Nels Nelson (politician) (1917–1992), Canadian Member of Parliament
- Nels Nelsen (1894–1943), Norwegian–Canadian ski jumper
- Nels David Nelson (1918–2003), American mathematician and logician
- Nels H. Nelson (1903–1973), United States Marine Corps general
