= Richard Nelson =

Richard Nelson is the name of:

- Richard Nelson (author) (1941–2019), anthropologist and writer
- Richard H. Nelson (fl. 1903–1929), Episcopal bishop in America
- Richard Nelson (lighting designer) (1938–1996), American lighting designer
- Richard Nelson (playwright) (born 1950), American playwright and librettist
- Richard A. Nelson (born 1941), vice admiral and surgeon general in the United States Navy
- Richard D. Nelson (born 1945), American Old Testament scholar
- Richard M. Nelson, American politician
- Richard R. Nelson (1930–2025), American professor of economics at Columbia University
- Richard Christian Nelson (born 1961), American artist and musician
- Anthony Nelson (politician) (Richard Anthony Nelson, born 1948), former British Conservative politician
- Richard Nelson, a fictional character in the film Poseidon
- Ricky Nelson (1940–1985), American singer
- Ricky Nelson (baseball) (1959-2021), former Major League Baseball outfielder
- Rick Nelson (politician) (born 1954), member of the Kentucky House of Representatives
- Rick "The Stick" Nelson, one of the characters of Glee
- Rick Nelson, contestant on Survivor: South Pacific (2011)

== See also ==
- Richard Nielsen (disambiguation)
- Richard Nelson Gale (1896–1982), general in the British Army
- Richard Nelson Bolles (1927–2017), former clergyman
- Richard Nelson Frye (1920–2014), U.S. professor of Iranian studies
