= Jeff Nelson =

Jeff Nelson may refer to:

- Jeff Nelson (pitcher) (born 1966), American retired baseball player
- Jeff Nelson (umpire) (born 1965), American baseball umpire
- Jeff Nelson (ice hockey) (born 1972), Canadian ice hockey player
- Jeff Nelson (runner) (born 1961), American long-distance runner
- Jeff Nelson (drummer) (born 1962), American drummer, former member of Minor Threat
