= Ben Nelson (disambiguation) =

Ben Nelson was a U.S. senator and governor from Nebraska.

Ben Nelson may also refer to:

- Ben Nelson (businessman), founder of Minerva Project and University and former head of Snapfish.com
- Ben Nelson (Australian footballer) (born 1977), AFL and SANFL Australian rules footballer
- Ben Nelson (footballer, born 2004), association football player
- Ben Nelson (American football) (born 1979), American football player
- Ben Nelson (field hockey), Irish field hockey player

== See also ==
- Benjamin Nelson (1911–1977), American sociologist
- Ben E. King (born Benjamin Earl Nelson; 1938–2015), American singer
