= Howard Nelson (ecologist) =

Trinidadian ecologist and biologist

Howard Nelson is a Trinidadian ecologist and wildlife biologist. Nelson earned his bachelor's and master's degrees at the University of the West Indies and his doctoral work at the University of Wisconsin–Madison under the guidance of Stanley Temple. For his MPhil degree he conducted an ecological study of the mammalian community of Trinidad, including the first camera trapping study of the ocelot (Leopardus pardalis) on Trinidad and the first survey of game mammals. For his doctoral work Nelson completed a re-classification of the vegetation communities of Trinidad and Tobago, a massive undertaking which updates John Stanley Beard's 1946 classification.

He was the CEO and Conservation Manager at the Asa Wright Nature Centre located in the Arima Valley in Trinidad's Northern Range between 2003 and 2008. He went on to help establish and become the programme lead of a regional masters programme at the University of the West Indies, the MSc Biodiversity Conservation and Sustainable Development in the Caribbean. In 2014 he worked at the University of Chester, where was senior lecturer in conservation, and led the Master's programme in Wildlie Conservation.

While working as the Environmental Biologist in the Ministry of the Environment between 2000-2001 and 2008-2009, Nelson played an important role in the drafting of laws to establish a National Parks and Wildlife Authority which, had it been implemented, would have radically altered the responsibility for environmental management in Trinidad and Tobago. Subsequently, as a member of cabinet appointed committees, he co-led the writing of the new National Wildlife, National Forest and National Protected Areas Policies for Trinidad and Tobago.

His work in the Caribbean NGO sector has included time as the President of BirdsCaribbean and as Co-Chair of their Endemics and Threatened Species Working Group , and as Chairman of the Board of the Caribbean Natural Resources Institute . Howard is also a member of the scientific council of the Caribaea Initiative .

Since 2019, Howard has been lecturer in Conservation Leadership at Fauna and Flora, and Afilliate Lecturer at the University of Cambridge's Department of Geography , where he teaches on the MPhil in Conservation Leadership . At the University of Cambridge, Dr Nelson has served at Acting Vice President, graduate tutor and a Fellow at Lucy Cavendish College . He has also recently served as Chair of the Darwin Plus Advisory Group for the Department of Environment, Food and Rural Affairs (DEFRA) , as a Vice President of the Linnean Society of London , and as a Trustee of the Rufford Foundation
