= Craig Nelson =

Craig Nelson may refer to:

- Craig Nelson (cricketer) (born 1969), South African cricketer
- Craig Nelson (footballer) (born 1971), Scottish football goalkeeper
- Craig Richard Nelson (1947–2025), American character actor
- Craig T. Nelson (born 1944), American actor
