= Tim Nelson =

Tim Nelson or Timothy Nelson may refer to:

== Entertainment ==
- Tim Blake Nelson (born 1964), American actor and director
- Tim Nelson (musician), lead vocalist of Australian band Cub Sport
- Tim Nelson (American musician), American musician and record producer
- Timothy Nelson, an Australian musician and lead singer of Timothy Nelson & The Infidels.

== Sports ==
- Tim Nelson, baseball manager for Ottawa Fat Cats
- Tim Nelson (lacrosse) (born c. 1963), American lacrosse player
- Tim Nelson (pickleball), namesake of the Nasty Nelson serve
- Tim Nelson (runner) (born 1984), American distance runner
