= Ruth Nelson =

Ruth Nelson may refer to:

- Ruth Nelson (volleyball), women's volleyball head coach
- Ruth Nelson (actress) (1905–1992), American stage and film actress
