= Jennifer Nelson =

Jennifer Nelson may refer to:

- Jennifer Nelson (filmmaker), American documentary filmmaker
- Jennifer Clark Nelson, American biostatistician
- Jennifer Yuh Nelson (born 1972), American director and storyboard artist
- Jenny Nelson, professor of physics
