= Gary Nelson =

Gary Nelson may refer to:

- Gary Nelson (director) (1934–2022), American film director
- Gary Nelson (auto racing) (born 1953), NASCAR champion crew chief and inspector, IMSA champion team manager
- Gary Lee Nelson (born 1940), American composer and media artist
- Gary V. Nelson (1953–2024), Canadian pastor
- Gary Nelson (bishop) (born 1952), bishop of the Anglican Diocese of North West Australia
- Gary A. Nelson (born c. 1936), American former politician in the state of Washington
- Gary K. Nelson (1935–2013), American politician in Arizona

== See also ==
- Garry Nelson (born 1961), English footballer
