= Joanna Nelson =

American ecologist

Joanna Nelson, PH.D.
- Education: Stanford University (BS) University of California, Santa Cruz (PH.D.)
- Awards: 2008 Ecological Society of America Sustainability Science Award
- Scientific career
- Fields: Estuarine ecology, fire ecology, climate science, fresh water security, and rapid environmental change

Joanna L. Nelson is an American ecologist and a 2008 Ecological Society of America Sustainability Science award recipient. She is the founder and principal of LandSea Science where she conducts research on coastal communities to find suitable conservation action.

== Education ==
Nelson obtained her MS and BS degrees in earth systems at Stanford University and later her Ph.D. at University of California, Santa Cruz.

== Career ==
After receiving her PH.D., Nelson conducted research at the Elkhorn Slough National Estuarine Research Reserve on salt water interactions with salt-marsh ecosystems looking into how sea-level rise will affect the future of salt marshes specifically with nitrogen uptake. Nelson's other fellowships with Stanford University include working with the Natural Capitol Program in Latin America and with NatureNet where she studied "water funds" and their ability to protect fresh water aquifers.

Nelson is currently the founder and principal of LandSea Science. Here she leads a group of ecologists to work with the environment and local communities, specifically focusing on that communities watershed, to try and find realistic solutions for their specific problems.

== Awards and honors ==
In 2008 Nelson co-authored the paper “Policy strategies to address sustainability of Alaskan boreal forests in response to a directionally changing climate” and won the 2008 Ecological Society of America Sustainability Science award. This award is given to scientist in the environmental and social science fields who conduct research on ecosystems and local sustainability. Her paper discusses change in Alaskan boreal forest ecosystems and address four specific changes that can be done as conservation action.

In 2013, Nelson was named as one of The Nature Conservancy's inaugural NatureNet Science Fellows.

== Selected publications ==
- Chapin, F. S.; Lovecraft, A. L.; Zavaleta, E. S.; Nelson, J.; Robards, M. D.; Kofinas, G. P.; Trainor, S. F.; Peterson, G. D.; Huntington, H. P.; Naylor, R. L. (2006). "Policy strategies to address sustainability of Alaskan boreal forests in response to a directionally changing climate". Proceedings of the National Academy of Sciences. 103 (45): 16637–16643. doi:10.1073/pnas.0606955103. PMC 1636507. PMID 17008403.
- Chapin, F. Stuart; Trainor, Sarah F.; Huntington, Orville; Lovecraft, Amy L.; Zavaleta, Erika; Natcher, David C.; McGuire, A. David; Nelson, Joanna L.; Ray, Lily; Calef, Monika; Fresco, Nancy; Huntington, Henry; Rupp, T. Scott; Dewilde, La'ona; Naylor, Rosamond L. (2008). "Increasing Wildfire in Alaska's Boreal Forest: Pathways to Potential Solutions of a Wicked Problem". BioScience. 58 (6): 531–540. doi:10.1641/B580609.
- Ferraro, Paul J.; Hanauer, Merlin M.; Miteva, Daniela A.; Nelson, Joanna L.; Pattanayak, Subhrendu K.; Nolte, Christoph; Sims, Katharine R. E. (2015). "Estimating the impacts of conservation on ecosystem services and poverty by integrating modeling and evaluation". Proceedings of the National Academy of Sciences. 112 (24): 7420–7425. Bibcode:2015PNAS..112.7420F. doi:10.1073/pnas.1406487112. PMC 4475938. PMID 26082549.
