= Ken Nelson =

Ken Nelson may refer to:

- Ken Nelson (American record producer) (1911–2008)
- Ken Nelson (British record producer) (born 1959)
- Kenneth Nelson (1930–1993), American actor
- Ken Nelson (businessman) (born 1962), British businessman
- Ken G. Nelson (born 1936), American politician in the Minnesota House of Representatives
- Ken Nelson (1954–2019), author of Bufo Alvarius: the Psychedelic Toad of the Sonoran Desert (1984)
