= Paul Nelson =

Paul Nelson may refer to:

- Paul Nelson (critic) (1936–2006), rock critic who worked for Rolling Stone
- Paul R. Nelson (born 1966), 2006 Republican nominee for Wisconsin's 3rd congressional district
- Paul Nelson (composer) (1929–2008), American musician and composer
- Paul Nelson (creationist) (born 1958), philosopher of science and Intelligent Design advocate
- Paul Nelson (musician) (1960–2024), guitarist with Liege Lord and Johnny Winter
- Paul Nelson (South Dakota politician), member of the South Dakota State House of Representatives
- Paul Nelson (architect) (1895–c. 1979), French architect
