= Julie Nelson (news anchor) =

American television journalist (born 1971)

- Born: November 12, 1971 (age 54)
- Education: Memorial High School; Indiana University Bloomington
- Occupation: Television anchor
- Children: 2

Julie Nelson (born November 12, 1971) is an American television anchor for KARE channel 11 (NBC affiliate) in the Minneapolis–Saint Paul metro area in Minnesota. She began working at KARE-TV in September 2003, and she currently anchors the 5, 6 and 10 p.m. newscasts. Before joining KARE-TV, Nelson anchored the 6 p.m. and 10 p.m. newscasts at KSTP channel 5 (ABC affiliate). Months after arriving at KSTP, she was named "Best Newcomer" by Mpls.St.Paul Magazine. A year later, the magazine named her one of the area's "One Hundred People to Watch." She has won a regional Emmy for anchoring, Regional Murrow award, Eric Sevareid award, and 3 "Best TV Newscaster" Awards from City Pages.

Born November 12, 1971, Nelson grew up in Eau Claire, Wisconsin, where she graduated, with honors, in 1990 from Eau Claire's Memorial High School.

Nelson received her Bachelor's degrees in journalism and history from Indiana University Bloomington in Indiana in 1994. She volunteers time for such causes as Habitat for Humanity, Treehouse, Christian Recovery Center, Wooddale Church, and Feed My Starving Children and served on the Indiana University School of Journalism Alumni Board from 2002 to 2005. She is married to her hometown sweetheart, and has two children.
