= Shane Nelson =

Shane Nelson may refer to:

- Shane Nelson (American football) (born 1955), former American football player
- Shane Nelson (fighter) (born 1984), American mixed martial artist
