= Barry Nelson (disambiguation) =

Barry Nelson (1917–2007) was an American actor.

Barry Nelson may also refer to:

- Barry Nelson (rugby league) (1932–2021), Australian prop in 1950s and 1960s
- Barry Nelson (basketball) (born 1949), American center in 1971 NBA Draft
