= Colin Nelson =

Colin Nelson may refer to:

- Colin Nelson (bobsleigh) (born 1942), Canadian bobsledder
- Colin Nelson (footballer, born 1938) (born 1938), English footballer
- Colin Nelson (footballer, born 1991) (born 1991), Guyanese footballer
