= H. G. Nelson =

H. G. Nelson may refer to:

- Harold George Nelson (1881–1947), former member of the Australian House of Representatives
- Greig Pickhaver (born 1948), who uses the pseudonym HG Nelson, member of the Australian comedy duo Roy and HG
