= Melissa K. Nelson =

Indigenous scholar and activist

- Monuments: Indigenous food sovereignty
- Education: University of California, Santa Cruz (BA)
- Alma mater: University of California, Davis (Ph.D.)
- Occupations: educator, author, ecologist
- Employer: Arizona State University
- Organization: Cultural Conservancy
- Known for: Indigenous knowledge and Ecology
- Website: faculty.sfsu.edu/~mknelson

Melissa K. Nelson is an Anishinaabe/Métis/Norwegian scholar and activist. She is an enrolled citizen of the Turtle Mountain Band of Chippewa Indians. She has been part of various activist groups that focus on Indigenous food sovereignty such as The Cultural Conservancy and Bioneers.

== Life and education ==
Nelson earned her B.A. in Ecology with a focus in Ecophilosophy from The University of California, Santa Cruz, and her Ph.D. in Native American Environmental Studies from The University of California at Davis. She is an Indigenous scholar and activist as well as a cultural ecologist, writer, and media-maker. She has spent more than 20 years as part of the Native American food movement and has been an international Indigenous food sovereignty activist since 2006.

== Career ==
Nelson is currently "the President of the Cultural Conservancy, an organization in San Francisco that works to protect and restore Indigenous cultures," a position she has held since 1993. From 2002-2020, she was a professor of American Indian Studies at San Francisco State University. She then became a professor of Indigenous Sustainability in the School of Sustainability at Arizona State University after leaving SFSU.

Nelson's work has focused on Indigenous food sovereignty, as well as the use of Indigenous knowledge to create a more sustainable food system, an issue that she has close personal ties to as an Anishinaabe/Métis woman herself. Nelson has also worked as a media-maker throughout her career in order to further her reach as an Indigenous rights activist.

== Publications ==
- The Salt Song Trail: Bringing Creation Back Together. Directed by Esther Figueroa, produced by Melissa Nelson and Philip M. Klasky, Juniroa Productions, 2005.
- Nelson, Melissa K.; Shilling, Dan (2018). Traditional Ecological Knowledge: Learning from Indigenous Practices for Environmental Sustainability. Cambridge University Press. ISBN 978-1108428569
- Nelson, Melissa K. (2008). Original Instructions: Indigenous Teachings for a Sustainable Future. Inner Traditions. ISBN 9781591430797
