= Terry Nelson =

Terry Nelson may refer to:

- Terry Nelson (American football) (born 1951), American former NFL player
- Terry Nelson (musician) (1943–2014), American disc jockey and musician
- Terry Nelson (politician), legislator from Montana
