= Carolyn Nelson =

Carolyn Nelson is the name of:

- Carolyn Nelson (politician) (born 1937), member of the North Dakota Senate
- Carolyn Nelson (actress) (1925–2014), actress active during the 1960s and 1970s, wife of Joseph Sargent

• Carolyn Nelson (actress)
