= Alan Nelson =

Alan Nelson is the name of:

- Alan C. Nelson (1933–1997), former Commission of the Immigration and Naturalization Services in the United States, and co-author of California Proposition 187
- Alan R. Nelson, former American Medical Association president
- Alan Nelson, director of the Arizona State University Biodesign Institute
- Alan Nelson (cricketer) (born 1965), Irish first-class cricketer
- Alan Nelson (writer), author of "Man in a Hurry" in the 1964 anthology The Unquiet Grave
