= Ann Nelson (disambiguation) =

Ann(e) Nelson may refer to:

- Ann Nelson (coach operator) (1772–1852), coach operator and London publican
- Anne Nelson (born 1954), American author and playwright
- Ann Nelson (1958–2019), particle physicist at the University of Washington
- Ann Nelson (swimmer) (born 1944), Northern Irish swimmer
- Ann Nelson (1916–1992), American actress, known for Fame (1982 TV series)
