= Charles Nelson =

Charles, Charlie, or Chuck Nelson may refer to:

== Arts and entertainment ==
- Charles Nelson (film editor) (1901–1997), American film editor
- Charles Nelson (writer) (1942–2003), American novelist
- Charlie Nelson (actor) (died 2026), French actor

== Law and politics ==
- Charles D. Nelson (1824–1895), American politician from Michigan
- Charles F. Nelson (1872–1940), Canadian politician
- Charles E. Nelson (1882–1966), Wisconsin state assemblyman
- Charles P. Nelson (Maine politician) (1907–1962), U.S. Representative from Maine
- Charles J. Nelson (1921–2011), American diplomat
- Charles Nelson (Kentucky politician) (1925–2019), American politician

== Sports ==
- Charles Nelson (volleyball) (born 1933), American volleyball player
- Chuck Nelson (born 1960), American football player
- Charles Nelson (wide receiver) (born 1995), American player of Canadian football

== Others ==
- Charles Nelson (businessman) (1835–1891), proprietor of Nelson's Greenbrier Distillery
- Charles Alexander Nelson (1839–1933), American librarian and bibliographer
- Charlie Nelson (centenarian) (1867–1978), American supercentenarian
- Charles Nelson (Tsimshian chief) (1868–1930), Tribal chief in Canada
- Charles P. Nelson (admiral) (1877–1935), American naval officer
- E. Charles Nelson (1951–2024), Northern Ireland botanist and author
- Charles A. Nelson III, American neuroscientist

== See also ==
- Charles Nelson Reilly (1931–2007), American game show host
- Charles L. Melson (1904–1981), American naval officer
