= Brett Nelson =

Brett Nelson may refer to:

- Brett Nelson (musician) (born 1969), American multi-instrumentalist, singer and songwriter
- Brett Nelson (basketball) (born 1980), American college basketball coach and former player
- Brett Nelson (EastEnders), British soap opera character
