= Todd Nelson =

Todd Nelson may refer to:

- Todd Nelson (ice hockey) (born 1969), former Canadian ice hockey player
- Todd Nelson (tennis) (born 1961), American former professional tennis player
- Todd S. Nelson, American CEO of three for-profit college chains
