= Peter Nelson =

Peter Nelson may refer to:

- Peter Nelson (actor) (born 1959), American actor
- Peter Nelson (b. 1852) (1852–1928), Danish-born American politician
- Peter Nelson (b. 1861) (1861–1938), Norwegian-born American politician
- Peter Nelson (composer) (born 1951, Scottish composer, theorist and academic
- Peter Nelson (cyclist) (1931–1977), Australian cyclist
- Peter Nelson (researcher), American professor and artificial intelligence researcher
- Peter Nelson, 9th Earl Nelson (1941–2009), British peer
- Peter Nelson Mwanza (born 1937), Malawian politician
- Peter Nelson (rugby union) (born 1992), Northern Irish rugby player
- Peter C. Nelson (1948–2013), American politician
- Peter Nelson (cricketer, born 1918) (1918–1992), English cricketer
- Peter Nelson (cricketer, born 1913) (1913–1998), English cricketer and British Army officer
