= Philip Nelson =

Philip Nelson may refer to:

- Philip Nelson (Wisconsin politician) (1891–1973), Wisconsin state Senator from 1931 to 1943
- Philip Nelson (American football) (born 1993), American football player
- Philip E. Nelson (born 1935), American food scientist
- Philip Nelson-Ward (1866–1937), British Royal Navy officer and courtier
- Philip Nelson (antiquarian) (1872–1953), British founder of the Nelson Collection

== See also ==
- Phillip Nelson (born 1929), emeritus professor in economics at SUNY Binghamton
- Nelson Phillips (1873–1939), Justice of the Texas Supreme Court
