= Patrick Nelson =

Patrick Nelson may refer to:

- Patrick Henry Nelson (1824–1864), Confederate States Army officer and militia general
- Patrick Henry Nelson II (1856–1914), lawyer and politician, son of the former
- Patrick Henry Nelson III (1910–1964), lawyer and politician, grandson of the former
