= Hugh Nelson =

Hugh Nelson may refer to:

- Hugh Nelson (Australian politician) (1833–1906), Premier of Queensland, Australia
- Hugh Nelson (Virginia politician) (1768–1836), American politician
- Hugh Nelson (Canadian politician) (1830–1893), Canadian politician
- Hugh Nelson (bishop) (born 1972), British Anglican Bishop of St Germans
