= Ron Nelson =

Ron Nelson may refer to:

- Ron Nelson (composer) (1929–2023), American composer of both classical and popular music and music academic
- Ron Nelson (basketball) (born 1946), American basketball player, played one season in the ABA
- Ron Nelson (DJ) (born 1962 or 1963), Canadian hip hop and reggae DJ, broadcaster, music producer and promoter
