= Thérèse Nelson =

American chef and culinary historian

Thérèe Nelson
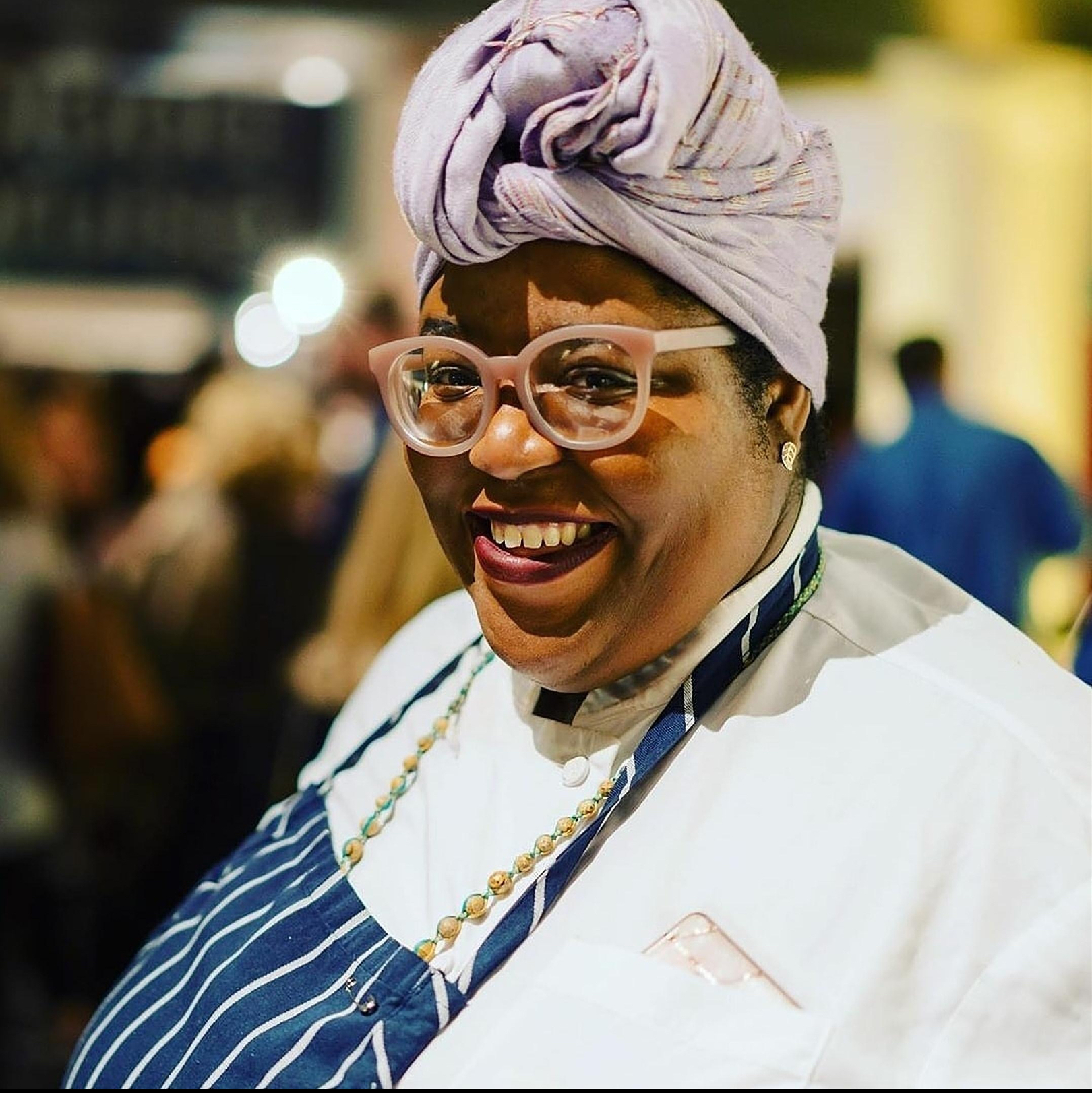
- Thérèse Nelson headshot
- Born: February 27, 1981 (age 45); Newark, New Jersey, U.S.
- Education: Johnson & Wales University
- Known for: Public History and Cultural Criticism
- Website: https://www.blackculinaryhistory.com

Thérèse Nelson is an American chef, author, and founder of Black Culinary History. She is recognized for her work preserving Black culinary heritage and educating hospitality professionals about Black culinary and cultural history.

== Early life ==
Nelson was born and raised in the historic Weequahic section of Newark, New Jersey. She attended University High School where she graduated in 1999.

== Career ==
Following her graduation from Johnson & Wales University in 2004 where she earned degrees in culinary arts and restaurant management, Nelson worked in the hotel restaurant industry, including time at the Marriott, Hilton, Orient Express, and Four Seasons. During this time, Nelson began to explore her culinary history as an American chef and found that such exploration required she also explore her African heritage, something that culinary school did not provide.

=== Get' Em Girls Inc. ===
In 2006 to 2012 Nelson worked for Get Em' Girl Inc., providing recipe consulting and food styling for two cookbooks, The Get Em' Girl's Guide to the Power of Cuisine and The Get Em Girl's Guide to the Perfect Get Together, as food editor for the company's lifestyle website GetEmGirls.com (no longer active), and executive chef for the company’s boutique catering company.

=== Independent catering ===
From 20012 to 2023, Nelson ran an independent private chef and catering company throughout the tristate area providing craft-services, personal chef service, and catering for a wide range of clients including American Express, Black Enterprise, Roc Nation, and Essence.

=== Cultural work ===
Nelson’s media work has been featured in anthologies, including Black Food, For the Culture, and Women on Food, and in digital and print publications including TASTE, Southern Living, Sandwich Magazine, While Entertaining, and Eating Well. She hosts a limited series podcast called Black Desserts presented by Black Food Folks and produced by Whetstone Media sponsored by Talenti Gelato and Sorbeto which focuses on the life and work of Black baking and pastry professionals and the larger narratives of Black culture in baking.

She has served as a cultural commentator for publications from The New York Times to NPR and curated conversations for cultural organizations such as the Schomburg Center, AfroPunk, The Culinary Institute of America, and the Center for Brooklyn History. In addition, Nelson serves has served as a cultural advisor to educational and cultural institutions, including the James Hemings Society, The Edna Lewis Foundation, and the Museum of Food and Drink(MOFAD).

=== Black Culinary History ===
Nelson founded the cultural resource site Black Culinary History in 2008 to provide "a way to connect Black chefs to their collective culinary heritage throughout the African diaspora, to promote and share the work of her colleagues, and to preserve the legacy being constructed by Black chefs for future generationS." The site includes a blog, resource pages, and a companion Facebook group.

== Personal life ==
Nelson resides in East Harlem, New York City.

== Publications ==
- Hot Sauce in My Veins, TASTE
- My Crush on George Washington Carver, TASTE
- Cookbooks, Not Restaurants, Are Giving Black Foodways an Identity, TASTE 9/28/2018
- Good Eats: 32 Writers on Eating Ethically Contributor, January 2024
- For The Culture Contributor, September 2023
- 100 Questions, Answers, and Recipes to Raise Your Cooking Smarts Contributor, February 2022
- Black Food Contributor, October 2021
- The Rise: Black Cooks and the Soul of American Food Contributor, October 2020
- Women on Food Contributor, October 2019

== Recipes ==
- Grandaddy's Pickled Pepper Table Sauce, TASTE
- Simple Southern Hot Sauce, TASTE
