= Tony Nelson =

Anthony or Tony Nelson may refer to:

- Anthony Nelson (politician) (born 1948), British Conservative politician
- Anthony Nelson (musician) (born 1975), gospel musician
- Anthony Nelson (boxer) (born 1985), English boxer
- Anthony Nelson (American football) (born 1997), American football player for the Tampa Bay Buccaneers
- Anton Nelson (Anthony Piers Nelson, born 1997), Caymanian footballer
- Tony Nelson (footballer) (1930–2022), Welsh former footballer
- Tony Nelson (hurdler) (born 1950), Canadian Olympic hurdler
- Tony Nelson (I Dream of Jeannie), a character in the TV series I Dream of Jeannie
