= Russell Nelson (disambiguation) =

Russell M. Nelson (1924–2025) was an American physician and leader in The Church of Jesus Christ of Latter-day Saints.

Russell Nelson may also refer to:

- Russ Nelson (born 1958), American computer programmer
- Russell Nelson (born 1973), Irish professional rugby union player
- J. Russell Nelson (1929–2016), American educator
