= Daniel Nelson =

Daniel Nelson may refer to:

- Dan Nelson (born 1976), American singer-songwriter
- Daniel Nelson, founder of Nelsonville, Ohio (1817)
- Daniel Nelson (Swedish composer) (born 1965)
