= Zita Nelson =

Spanish-born Argentine singer

- Born: Madrid, Spain
- Origin: Argentina
- Occupation: Soprano singer

Zita Nelson was a Spanish-born Argentine soprano and singer, active in the early decades of the 20th century. Able to sing in nine languages, her repertoire spanned from difficult arias to simple songs.

== Biography ==
Zita Nelson was born in Madrid. She began singing professionally at a young age, having learned to sing in nine languages. She sang difficult arias as well as simple songs. In 1934, she appeared on the cover of the magazine, Revista Sintonía, which was popular in its time.

Nelson performed with the Symphonic Orchestra directed by José María Castro. In Argentina, she sang on the National Radio and Radio Culture (1937). She also worked in LR6 Radius Mitre beside the tenor Enzo Bor and with the classical quartet H Fall. Nelson is remembered for her performances during the decade of 1930, not only for her lyrical performances but also as a tango singer, her contemporaries being Maruja Pacheco Huergo, Libertad Lamarque, Argentina Rojas, Azucena Maizani, Audelina Suárez, Norma Galán and Mercedes Simone, among others.
