= Brad Nelson =

Brad Nelson may refer to:

- Brad Nelson (baseball) (born 1982), American baseball player
- Brad Nelson (gamer), American video game player

== See also ==
- Bradley Nelson (born 1962), American robotist
