= Edmund Nelson =

Edmund Nelson may refer to:

- Edmund Nelson (priest) (1722–1802), Anglican clergyman, father of Horatio Nelson
- Edmund Nelson (American football) (born 1960), American football defensive lineman
- Edmund Nelson (painter) (1910–2007), British portrait painter
