= Don Nelson (disambiguation) =

Don Nelson (1940–2026) was an American basketball coach and player.

Don Nelson may also refer to:

- Don Nelson (screenwriter) (1927–2013), American screenwriter, film producer and jazz musician
- Donn Nelson or Donnie Nelson (born 1962), American basketball executive

== See also ==
- Dan Nelson (born 1976), American singer-songwriter
- Don Neilson, Canadian country musician
- Donald Nelson (1888–1959), American executive and public servant
- Donald Gordon Medd Nelson (1914–1989), Canadian Surgeon General
- Donald Nelsen (born 1944), American cyclist
- Donald Neilson (1936–2011), British criminal
