= Grant S. Nelson =

American professor (born 1939)

Grant S. Nelson (born 1939) is the William H. Rehnquist Professor of Law, at Pepperdine University. A leading scholar of real estate law, Nelson was previously professor of law at the University of California, Los Angeles. He was "Professor of the Year" three times at UCLA and won the Rutter Award. He has published extensively on the topic of real estate transactions. He served as a co-reporter for the American Law Institute's Restatement of Property. He taught at the University of Missouri School of Law for 24 years.

== Personal background ==
He is a graduate of the University of Minnesota and the University of Minnesota Law School, where he was an editor of the Minnesota Law Review.

He also practiced law briefly with the Minneapolis, Minnesota firm of Faegre and Benson.
