= Ray Nelson =

Ray Nelson may refer to:

- Ray Nelson (author) (1931–2022), American author
- Ray Nelson (baseball) (1875–1961), American baseball player
- Ray Nelson (rugby union) (born 1961), Scottish rugby union footballer
- Ray Nelson Jr. (born 1965), American animator

== See also ==
- Raymond Nels Nelson (1921–1981), American newspaper editor
