= Tracy Nelson =

Tracy Nelson may refer to:

- Tracy Nelson (actress) (born 1963), American actress
- Tracy Nelson (singer) (born 1944), American singer
- Tracy Nelson (lacrosse), American lacrosse player and lacrosse coach
- Tracy Nelson/Mother Earth, 1972 album by Mother Earth
