= Roger Nelson =

Roger Nelson may refer to:

- Roger Nelson (politician) (1759–1815), represented Maryland in the United States House of Representatives
- Roger Nelson (skydiver) (1955–2003), founder of Skydive Chicago
- Roger Nelson (Canadian football) (1932–1996), Canadian Football League football player
- Roger Nelson (baseball) (born 1944), Major League Baseball pitcher, 1967–1976
- Roger D. Nelson, director of the Global Consciousness Project

== See also ==
- Prince (musician) (1958–2016), aka Prince Rogers Nelson
