= Arthur C. Nelson =

American urban planner and academic

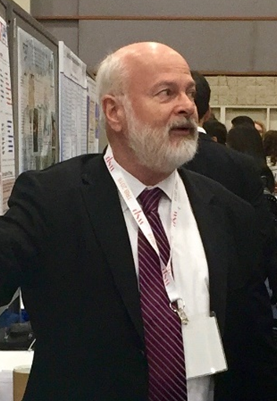
- Nelson in 2018
- Other names: Chris Nelson; Arthur Christian Nelson
- Occupations: Urban planner, researcher and academic

Academic background
- Education: B.Sc., Political Science; Master of Urban Studies in Public Administration; Ph.D., Urban Studies
- Alma mater: Portland State University
- Website: arthurcnelson.com

Arthur C. Nelson is an American urban planner, researcher and academic. He is Professor of Urban Planning and Real Estate Development at the University of Arizona.

Nelson's research has been focused on metropolitan development policy and planning, applied demographic and economic analysis, fiscal impact assessment, public facility planning and finance, growth management/smart growth, urban development/redevelopment analysis and policy, real estate development policy, suburban and exurban development patterns, and economic development.

Nelson is a fellow of the American Institute of Certified Planners, a fellow of the Academy of Social Sciences and a fellow of the Growth and Infrastructure Consortium. He has also served as editor of Housing Policy Debate and associate editor of Journal of the American Planning Association and the Journal of Urban Affairs.

== Education ==
Nelson received his B.Sc. in Political Science from Portland State University in 1972. While a consultant in planning and development along the West Coast, he continued his education at Portland State University, completing the Master of Urban Studies in Public Administration in 1976 and the Ph.D. in Urban Studies with concentrations in regional planning and regional science in 1984.

== Career ==
After completing his Ph.D. in 1984, became Visiting Assistant Professor of Regional and Community Planning at Kansas State University. In 1985, he joined the University of New Orleans as assistant professor of urban and public affairs where, in 1986, he founded the Division of Urban Research and Policy Studies Research and was founding director of the university's undergraduate minor in urban studies and served as adjunct professor of social work at Southern University at New Orleans. In 1987, Nelson joined the Georgia Institute of Technology as Associate Professor of City Planning and in 1988 became jointly appointed as Associate Professor of Public Policy. In 1989, he founded the Graduate Certificate in Land Development. In 1991, Nelson founded the College of Architecture graduate co-op program. In 1992, he was promoted to full professor in the College of Architecture and the Ivan College of Liberal Arts at Georgia Tech. In 2002, as adjunct professor of law at Georgia State University, Nelson co-founded a dual degree program between the Master of City and Regional Planning degree at Georgia Tech and the Juris Doctor (J.D.) degree at Georgia State University.

In 2002, Nelson left Georgia Tech to join the Virginia Polytechnic Institute and State University as a Professor of Urban Affairs and Planning. There he founded the Urban Affairs and Planning Program at the Alexandria Center and served as its director until 2006 when he became the Co-Director of Metropolitan Institute at Virginia Tech. In 2005, he created the university's first graduate dual degree, called 'sequential degree', programs. He also served as the Founding Director of Planning Academy at Virginia Tech.

Nelson left Virginia Tech in 2008 to join the University of Utah as Presidential Professor of City and Metropolitan Planning. There he founded the Master of Real Estate Development program, the doctoral program in Metropolitan Planning, Policy and Design, and the Metropolitan Research Center. He also served as adjunct professor of finance in the David Eccles School of Business. In 2014, he became Presidential Professor Emeritus at the University of Utah and was appointed professor of urban planning and real estate development at the University of Arizona. From 2014 to 2016, he was the associate dean of research and discovery for the College of Architecture, Planning and Landscape Architecture at Arizona. In 2016 he was extended an additional appointment as professor of geography, Development and Environment in the School of Social and Behavioral Sciences.

There are numerous endowed positions and scholarships in Nelson's name including the Arthur C. Nelson Fellowship supporting women, people of color and indigenous descent, veterans, disabled persons, and members of the LGBTQ community studying planning awarded by the American Planning Association, the Arthur C. Nelson and Clark Ivory Doctoral Fellowship in metropolitan planning, policy and design students at the University of Utah, and the Arthur C. Nelson Fellowship in Urban Planning and Real Estate Development at the University of Arizona.

== Research and work ==
Nelson is widely known for his work in several fields such as growth management/smart growth, suburban/exurban analysis, applied demographic and economic analysis to understand the future of metropolitan development patterns, and the theory and practice of development mitigation. With James B. Duncan, Nelson co-wrote Growth Management Principles and Practices. It explains growth management at the local, county, regional, and state levels, including an overall theory of growth management to mitigate externalities associated with underpriced infrastructure, conflicting land uses, and tax policies that subsidize urban sprawl.

With Thomas W. Sanchez, Nelson identified many of the causes and consequences of exurbanization. While some have argued that exurbia exists because exurbanites have different housing and location preferences than suburbanites, Nelson's research has shown that exurbia is nothing more than the suburbanization of the suburbs.

With James C. Nicholas and Julian Conrad Juergensmeyer, Nelson has advanced the application of proportionate share impact fees to mitigate the adverse effects of development on public facilities.

Nelson is also known for applying demographic and economic trends to understand how America's metropolitan areas are changing. One of his key findings is that by the middle 2000s there were already more homes on large suburban lots than the market may need by the middle 2020s. Kaid Benfield wrote that Nelson predicted the 2007 collapse of the housing market because of oversupply of key housing types. According to Ellen Dunham-Jones, Nelson shows that for most metropolitan areas, perhaps all new development needs can be met on existing parking lots and existing low density/intensity developed sites.

Nelson's recent work explores the interaction between public transit, land use patterns, economic development, and demographic settlement patterns.

In 2019, Nelson's h-index was 51.

== Awards and honors ==
- Professional Educator of the Year in Architecture, Georgia Institute of Technology
- Teacher of the Year in Architecture, Georgia Institute of Technology
- Scholar of the Year, College of Architecture and Urban Studies, Virginia Tech
- Paul Davidoff best book award, part of Xavier de Sousa Briggs, ed., The Geography of Opportunity: Race and Housing Choice in Metropolitan America, Washington: Brookings Institution
- FAICP – Fellow of the American Institute of Certified Planners.
- FAcSS – Fellow of the Academy of Social Sciences
- Fellow, Growth and Infrastructure Consortium
- Lieutenant Colonel, Georgia Militia, honorary commission by Governor Joe Frank Harris for state service
- Fellow, Lincoln Institute of Land Policy
- Arizona Champion for academic achievement, University of Arizona
- Faculty Fellow, Penn Institute for Urban Research

== Books ==
- Development Impact Fees: Theory, Issues, and Practice (1988)
- A Practitioner's Guide to Development Impact Fees (1991)
- The Regulated Landscape: Lessons of Statewide Planning From Oregon (1991)
- Water, Wastewater, and Stormwater System Development Charges (1995)
- Growth Management Principles and Practice (1995)
- Planners Estimating Guide: Projecting Land-Use and Facility Needs (2004)
- Urban Containment in the United States (2004)
- The Social Impacts of Urban Containment (2007)
- Impact Fees and Housing Affordability: A Guidebook for Practitioners (2007)
- A Guide to Impact Fees and Housing Affordability (2008)
- Environmental Regulations and Housing Costs (2009)
- The New Politics of State Planning (2009)
- Impact Fees: Principles and Practice of Proportionate-Share Development Fees (2009)
- Megapolitan America: A New Vision for Understanding America's Metropolitan Geography (2011)
- The TDR Handbook: Planning and Designing Transfer of Development Rights Programs (2012)
- Reshaping Metropolitan America: Trends and Opportunities to 2030 (2013)
- Foundations of Real Estate Development Financing: A Guide to Public-Private Partnerships (2014)
- Market Demand Based Planning and Permitting (2017)
