= Donna Nelson (disambiguation) =

Donna Nelson may refer to:

- Donna Nelson (born 1954) is an American chemist.
- Dona Nelson (born 1947), American painter
- Donna G. Nelson (born 1943), American politician
