= Pamela Nelson =

American artist

- Education: Southern Methodist University
- Known for: Painting mixed media public art installations
- Notable work: Color Equations at NorthPark Center public artworks for DART stations Terrazzo floor medallions at DFW International Airport
- Style: Geometric patterns
- Awards: City of Dallas Urban Design Award (2000); Dallas Contemporary’s Legend Award (2000)
- Elected: Vice chair of the U.S. Commission of Fine Arts (2005) 4

Pamela Nelson is an American artist that works in painting, mixed media, and public art installations featuring geometric patterns.

== Biography ==
Nelson grew up in Midland, Texas, and graduated from Southern Methodist University. Nelson worked as a community college instructor when she helped start the Stewpot Open Art Program for the homeless. She was elected the vice chair of the U.S. Commission of Fine Arts in 2005 and served in that capacity for more than a decade.

Public artworks by Nelson include decorative artworks for Dallas Area Rapid Transit stations, terrazzo floor medallions at Dallas/Fort Worth International Airport and a color theory installation titled Color Equations at NorthPark Center.

Nelson has exhibited in over 100 national venues, including the Dallas Museum of Art, Austin Museum of Art, Arkansas Art Center in Little Rock, Beaumont Museum of Art, Texas, National Museum of Women in the Arts in Washington DC, and the National Arts Club in New York City.

She is represented by Craighead Green Gallery in Dallas, Texas.

== Recognition ==
In 2000, Nelson participated in the Dallas City Center TIF Streetscape Project, for which she received the City of Dallas Urban Design Award. In the same year she received the Dallas Contemporary’s Legend Award from Dallas Visual Art Center.

== Personal life ==
Pamela Nelson was married to William Nelson, who died in 2014. The couple had two sons together.

A childhood friend of former U.S. First Lady Laura Bush, Nelson installed a painting titled To Everything Turn at the Bush Presidential Center in Dallas, Texas. George W. Bush took up painting as a hobby at Nelson's insistence when Laura Bush shared some his doodles with Nelson.
