= Wendy Nelson =

Wendy Nelson may refer to:

- Wendy Nelson (politician) (born 1962), South African politician
- Wendy Nelson (marine scientist), New Zealand botanist and phycologist
- Wendy Watson Nelson (born 1950), Canadian-American marriage and family therapist
