= Thomas Nelson =

Thomas, Tom, or Tommy Nelson may refer to:

== Politics and government ==
- Thomas Nelson Jr. (1738–1789), American Revolutionary War leader; signer of Declaration of Independence; governor of Virginia (1781)
  - SS Thomas Nelson, a Liberty ship
- Thomas Nelson (secretary) (1716–1782), American merchant, planter and politician from Virginia
- Thomas M. Nelson (1782–1853), American congressman from Virginia
- Thomas A. R. Nelson (1812–1873), American congressman from Tennessee
- Thomas Nelson (Oregon judge) (1819–1907), Chief Justice of Oregon Supreme Court, 1850–1853
- Thomas G. Nelson (1936–2011), federal judge to the United States Court of Appeals for the Ninth Circuit
- Thomas H. Nelson (1824–1896), American diplomat during and after the Civil War
- Thomas Leverett Nelson (1827–1897), American judge
- Tom Nelson (Wisconsin politician) (born 1976), American politician
- Tom Nelson (South Dakota politician) (born 1957) - see List of members of the South Dakota State Senate
- Thomas Nelson (Northern Ireland politician) (1888–1954), Northern Irish politician, for Enniskillen

== Sports ==
- Tommy Nelson (baseball) (1917–1973), American baseball infielder
- Tom Nelson (American football player) (born 1986), American football player
- Tom Nelson (American football coach), American football coach in the United States
- Tom Nelson (Australian footballer) (1883–1957), Australian rules footballer
- Thomas Arthur Nelson (1876–1917), Scottish rugby player

== Other fields ==
- Thomas "Scotch Tom" Nelson (1677–1747), Scottish immigrant and merchant to America in the Colony of Virginia
- Thomas Nelson, 2nd Earl Nelson (1786–1835), English nobleman who was a nephew of Admiral Horatio Nelson
- Thomas Nelson, 4th Earl Nelson (1857–1947), British peer
- Thomas C. Nelson (born 1961/62), American businessman, chairman and CEO of National Gypsum
- Thomas D. Nelson, Sr. (1895–2007), African-American shopkeeper (from Texas) who lived six months past his 111th birthday
- Tommy Nelson (actor) (born 1997), American actor
- Thomas Nelson (1822–1892), Scottish businessman and inventor of an improved rotary printing press
- Thomas Marsh Nelson (c. 1817–1884), English architect
- Thomas Hudson Nelson (1856–1916), British ornithologist

== Other uses ==
- Thomas Nelson (publisher), a Scottish publishing firm
- Thomas Nelson Community College, Virginia
- Thomas Nelson High School, Nelson County, Kentucky
