= Tyler Nelson =

Tyler Nelson may refer to:

- Tyler Nelson (basketball) (born 1995)
- Tyler Nelson (editor), film and television

== See also ==
- Nelson Tyler, engineer and inventor
