= Tyrone Nelson =

American basketball player (born 1985)

Tyrone Nelson (born July 16, 1985 in Brenham, Texas) is an American basketball player who played with the New Mexico State University Aggies team (Western Athletic Conference) where he majored in Family and Child Sciences.

Prior to college, Nelson played four years at Hempstead High School, where he averaged 29 points and 15 rebounds per game. After graduating high school, he played one season for Prairie View A&M, starting 23 games for the Panthers. Nelson averaged 15.1 points and 8.4 rebounds per game and collected season totals of 22 blocks and 32 steals, leading his team in each category. Nelson and also shot 47.8% from the floor and was named South Western Athletic Conference Freshman of the Year in the spring of 2004.

The following season, he transferred to New Mexico State University and red-shirted as per NCAA regulations.

Nelson averaged 17.8 points and 8.7 rebounds, and a shooting percentage of 55.1% in his 2005-2006 season for NMSU, earning himself Western Athletic Conference Player of the Week twice.

On August 24, 2006, Nelson was arrested at Mesilla Valley Mall in Las Cruces after reportedly having been identified by a pizza delivery man employed at a restaurant inside the mall. The employee alleged that Nelson had robbed him earlier that month. Nelson was charged with two felonies — robbery and conspiracy to commit robbery — and held on $15,000 bond at Doña Ana County Jail. Though he was released when his brother arranged to pay bail money, Nelson was given a three-day suspension by his team. Says NMSU Aggies' coach Reggie Theus: "The situation is not consistent with Tyrone's character, but we will get to the bottom of what happened." Mr. Nelson still starts for the New Mexico State Aggies Basketball team with felony charges.

Now, he is playing in Turkey Second League team Akhisar Belediyespor. His current statistics are: 22,6 points, 10.7 rebounds.
