= Keith Nelson =

Keith Nelson may refer to:

- Keith Nelson (basketball) (born 1969), American former basketball player
- Keith Nelson (footballer) (1947–2020), New Zealand international footballer
- Keith Nelson (musician), producer and guitarist of Buckcherry
- Keith Nelson (rugby union) (1938–2025), New Zealand rugby union player
- Keith A. Nelson, American chemist
- Keith Dwayne Nelson (1974–2020), American convicted child murderer
- Keith Nelson, a fictional character played by Eric Stoltz in the film Some Kind of Wonderful

== See also ==
- Keith Nelson-class lifeboat, an experimental lifeboat built for the Royal National Lifeboat Institution
