= Miriam Nelson =

Miriam Nelson may refer to:

- Miriam E. Nelson (born 1960), social entrepreneur and author
- Miriam Nelson (choreographer) (1919–2018), American choreographer, dancer, and actress
- Miriam Nelson (sprinter) (born 1916), American sprinter, 50 m runner-up at the 1935 USA Outdoor Track and Field Championships
