= Shawn Nelson =

Sean, Shaun, or Shawn Nelson may refer to:

- Sean Nelson (born 1973), American musician and journalist
- Sean Nelson (actor) (born 1980), American actor
- Shaun Nelson (born 1973), Australian politician
- Shawn Nelson (American football) (born 1985), former American football tight end
- Shawn C. Nelson, American actor and acting coach
- Shawn David Nelson (born 1977), American entrepreneur
- Shawn Nelson (1959–1995), perpetrator of the 1995 San Diego tank rampage
