= Polycarpus Nelson =

American Public Servant

- Born: July 21, 1680; Long Island, New York
- Died: December 19, 1738 (aged 58); Mamaroneck, New York
- Resting place: Nelson Hill
- Spouse: Ruth Gedney
- Children: 18

Polycarpus Nelson (July 21, 1680 - December 19, 1738) was a landowner and leading citizen of Colonial New York. He held lands In Dutchess County, where he was involved in the Great Nine Partners Patent.

== Family and origins ==
Polycarpus was born to John and Hendrickje Nelson on Long Island, New York. His father was one of the original incorporators of Mamaroneck, where he was elected Constable in 1699 and Town Officer in 1702. Polycarpus was married to Ruth Gedney of the Gedney Family and together, they had 18 children. He came from the same Nelson family in England as Horatio Nelson; However, unlike other branches of the family, the New York Nelsons could not keep an unbroken line. Nelson was an ancestor of New York politician William Nelson.

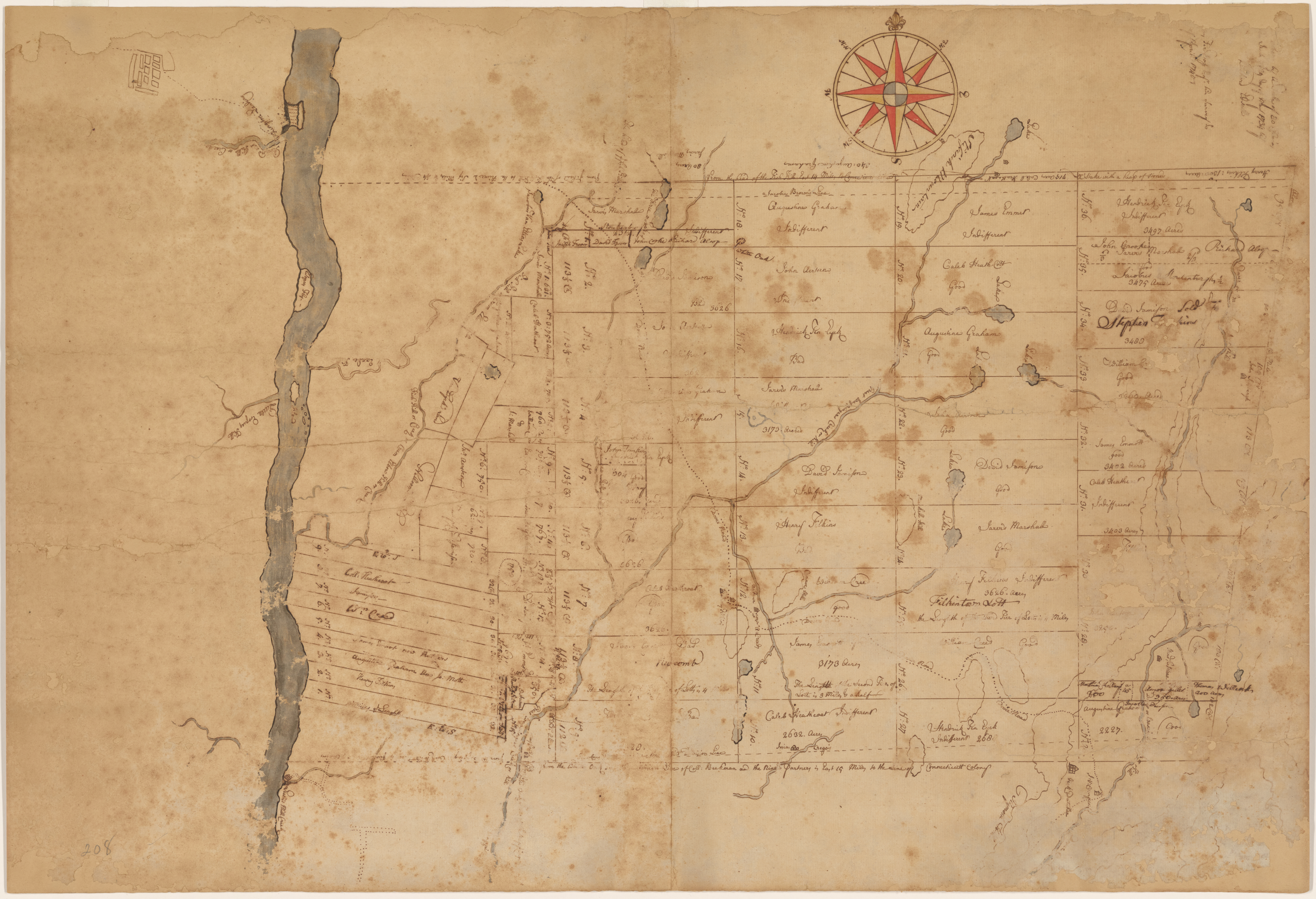
The Nine Partners Patent

John Nelson, the father of Polycarpus, emigrated from the town of Norfolk between the years 1660 and 1665. The ship in which he sailed was forced, by the weather, to the coast of France, where the passengers were distributed among the French Peasantry until the ship could be repaired. John Nelson was given quarters by a French Physician named Polycarpus. Nelson offered to repay Polycarpus for his kindness, but he refused and requested that Nelson name his firstborn son Polycarpus, which Nelson did.

== Life ==
Nelson was elected constable of Mamaroneck in 1712 and overseer of highways in 1719. He is listed as the sheriff of Dutchess county at the time of his death in 1738. The Nelson estate was situated on Nelson hill overlooking Mamaroneck bay. Nelson Hill, which bore the name of the father of Polycarpus, was made memorable on the day before the Battle of White Plains, when Colonel Smallwood cut off a large British force commanded by Major Robert Rogers stationed on Nelson hill. 33 years after the original Great Nine Partners Patent was issued, Nelson bought 1304 acres of land, lying on Crum-Elbow Creek in the town of Clinton, from three attorneys of David Jamison. The land which Nelson owned is now a part of the Vanderbilt National Historic Site in Hyde Park. Nelson was a signer of the declaration by the country's leading citizens in support of William and Mary and against the house of Stuart. In 1738 while Polycarpus was constable, he was killed in his tannery at Mamaroneck. He was sent to arrest one of his own employees; when a man stuck him with a tanner's cleaver, splitting his head and killing him instantly.
