= Ernie Nelson =

Australian rules footballer

Personal information
- Full name: Ernest Albert Nelson
- Born: 9 September 1874; Walhalla, Victoria
- Died: 17 November 1915 (aged 41); Heidelberg, Victoria

Playing career^{1}
Years	Club	Games (Goals)
1900	South Melbourne	7 (0)
- ^{1} Playing statistics correct to the end of 1900.

Ernest Albert Nelson (9 September 1874 – 17 November 1915) was an Australian rules footballer who played with South Melbourne in the Victorian Football League (VFL).
