= Homer Nelson =

Homer Nelson may refer to:

- Homer Augustus Nelson (1829–1891), American politician and Civil War colonel
- Homer Nelson (Wisconsin politician) (1826–?), American politician
