= George Nelson =

George Nelson may refer to:

- George Nelson (Lord Mayor of London), Lord Mayor of London, 1765
- George Nelson, 8th Earl Nelson (1905–1981)
- George Nelson (astronaut) (born 1950), former NASA astronaut
- George Nelson (designer) (1908–1986), American industrial designer
- George Nelson (footballer) (1919–1981), Australian footballer for Collingwood and Richmond
- George Nelson (trade unionist) (1868-1928), British trade unionist and politician
- George Nelson, 1st Baron Nelson of Stafford (1887–1962), British engineer
- George Nelson, 2nd Baron Nelson of Stafford (1917–1995), English engineer
- George A. Nelson (1873–1962), 1936 vice presidential candidate of the Socialist Party of America
- George B. Nelson (1876–1943), justice of the Wisconsin Supreme Court
- George R. Nelson (1927–1992), American set decorator
- George Nelson (Alamo defender)

== See also ==
- Baby Face Nelson (1908–1934), bank robber, also known as George Nelson
- George Neilson (1872–1944), Scottish rugby player
- Nelson George (born 1957), African-American author, critic and filmmaker
