= O. B. Nelson =

American politician

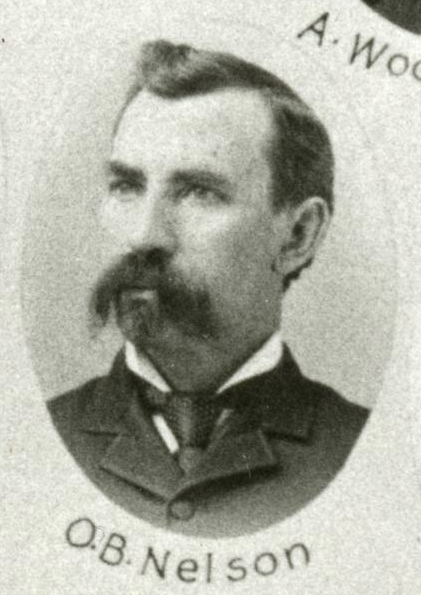
- Nelson in 1895

Member of the Washington House of Representatives
- In office 1893–1895 (3rd district); 1895–1897 (4th district)

Personal details
- Born: August 25, 1850 Denmark
- Died: June 6, 1922 (aged 71) Spokane, Washington, United States
- Party: Republican

Ole B. Nelson (August 25, 1850 – June 6, 1922) was a Danish-American politician in the state of Washington. He served in the Washington House of Representatives from 1893 to 1897.
