= Caroline Nelson =

Danish-born birth control advocate and radical socialist (1868–1952)

Caroline Nelson (also Caroline Nelson Rave; 1868–1952) of Denmark was an American birth control advocate and radical socialist. A member of Margaret Sanger's inner circle, she was affiliated with the Northern California Birth Control Committee of 100. As a San Francisco-based Wobbly organizer, she spoke at IWW meetings, along with Emma Goldman, Elizabeth Gurley Flynn, and Rose Pastor Stokes. Nelson was married to Carl Rave, an ironworker and union activist who also participated in birth control activism.
