= Steve Nelson =

Steve Nelson may refer to:

- Steve Nelson (Pen Name), Creator of MyHouse.wad
- Steve Nelson (activist) (1903–1993), Communist Party member, Spanish Civil War veteran and U.S. Supreme Court litigant
- Steve Nelson (songwriter) (1907–1981), radio producer and singer, co-writer of "Frosty the Snowman"
- Steve Nelson (American football) (born 1951), New England Patriots football player
- Steve Nelson (vibraphonist) (born 1954), American musician
- Steven Nelson (art historian) (born 1962), American art historian
- Stephen L. Nelson (born 1959), American author of computer books
- Stephen Nelson (sportscaster) (born 1989), American television personality and play-by-play commentator
- Steven Nelson (born 1993), American football player
- Steven Lawayne Nelson (1987–2025), American executed murderer
- Steven Sharp Nelson (born 1977), American cellist and songwriter
