= Joshua Nelson =

Joshua Nelson may refer to:

- Joshua Nelson (singer), American gospel singer and Hebrew teacher
- Joshua Nelson (politician) (born 1987), member of the West Virginia House of Delegates

== See also ==
- Josh Nelson (born 1978), American jazz pianist and composer
