= Alfred Nelson =

Alfred Nelson may refer to:

- Alfred Nelson (cricketer) (1871–1927), English cricketer
- Alfred Nelson (footballer) (born 1992), Ghanaian footballer
- Alfred C. Nelson (1898–1980), chancellor of the University of Denver

== See also ==
- Alfred Nelson-Williams, Sierre Leonan army officer
