= Louis Nelson =

Louis Nelson may refer to:

- Louis Nelson (trombonist) (1902–1990), American jazz trombonist
- Louis Nelson (artist) (1936–2024), American artist

== See also ==
- Louis Nelson Delisle (1885–1949), American clarinetist
