= Candice Nelson =

Candice Nelson may refer to:

- Candice Nelson (political scientist), academic at the Center for Congressional and Presidential Studies
- Candice Nelson (songwriter), member of music producers The Clutch
