= Mary Nelson =

Mary Nelson may refer to:

- Mary Nelson Winslow (1887–1952), American researcher
- Mary Wilburn (1932–2021), American lawyer
- Mary Nelson (politician), American politician from New Hampshire
- Mary Peltola (born 1973), American politician from Alaska
