= Steady Nelson =

American musician

Horace Steadman "Steady" Nelson (1913—1988), born in Jefferson, Texas, was a 20th-century American musician who specialized in Jazz and Swing during the Big Band era. He recorded over 60 sessions on trumpet and vocals with Woody Herman, Hal McIntyre, the Casa Loma Orchestra, Horace Hiedt, the NBC Radio orchestra and others. Nelson's most important works are his instrumental lead in "Woodchopper's Ball" and two solo vocal recordings with Woody Herman's band : "I’m Comin’ Virginia", and "Rosetta". Nelson has been declared a Texas Music Pioneer by the Texas Music Office, a division of the Office of the Governor of Texas.

This link has details of Steady life. https://web.archive.org/web/20081006192834/http://www.art-dir.com/Steady%20Nelson%20Bio.htm
