= Seth Iredell Nelson =

American pioneer

Seth Iredell Nelson, Sr. (1809 in Penns Valley, Union County, Pennsylvania - 1905, Round Island, Clinton County) was an early resident and a prominent pioneer hunter in the Keating Mountain vicinity of Clinton County, Pennsylvania.

== Biography ==
Seth Iredell Nelson was born about 1809 in Penns Valley, Union County, Pennsylvania. Seth was the oldest son of David Nelson and Mary Elizabeth née Lashbough Nelson.

In 1834, Nelson married Elizabeth (née Keeler). They had six daughters and three sons together.

Nelson developed a cant hook style that was used to roll logs in Clinton and Berks Counties in Pennsylvania during the 19th Century.

In 1853, it was approved by the Commonwealth of Pennsylvania that general and township elections for Keating Township would take place at the home of Seth Nelson.

In Keating Township, Clinton County, Pennsylvania, there is a small town called Nelsonville. This was a small community on Keating Mountain founded by Seth Nelson.

Nelson died on his farm at Round Island, Clinton County in 1905. He was buried in Nelsonville Cemetery in Keating, Clinton County, Pennsylvania.

== Hunting achievements ==
Nelson has often been regarded as one of Central Pennsylvania’s most successful and resourceful big game hunters and armorers. As a hunter, Seth was so renowned that he was dubbed “The King Hunter of the Sinnemahoning” by the Seneca Indians.

Nelson kept a game book and documented hundreds of panthers, wolves, elk, thousands of deer, bears, wildcats, and other animals that he killed during his long career in the Pennsylvania big game fields. Nelson also said to have killed the last known wolverine in Pennsylvania.

While Nelson is renowned and well respected as a hunter, there are many legends surrounding his incredible strength and athleticism. Nelson made claims that he had recovered from blindness and having the ability to paddle himself across the Susquehanna River without a boat among many other claims.

One account stated that Nelson once threw a mountain lion out of his cabin.
