= Bruce Nelson (businessman) =

- Born: 1945 (age 80–81)
- Education: Idaho State University, Stanford University
- Occupation: Former CEO of Office Depot
- Spouse: LaVaun Nelson

M. Bruce Nelson is an American businessman and former CEO of Office Depot. He made a career in the office supply industry leading several companies including: Viking Office Products (later merged with Office Depot), BT Office Products USA, and Boise Cascade Office Products.

== Early life and education ==
Bruce was born in 1945 and attended Idaho State University graduating with a BA in 1968. He also attend the Stanford Graduate School of Business and in 1984 he graduated from Stanford University's executive program. He is married to LaVaun Nelson with whom he has two children.

== Early career ==
=== Boise Cascade Office Products ===
From 1968 to 1990, Nelson served in senior management at Boise Cascade.

=== BT Office Products USA ===
Nelson was president and chief executive officer of BT Office Products USA from 1990 to July 1994.

=== Viking Office Products ===
In January 1995 Nelson began working as executive vice president at Viking Office Products, In July he became CEO. From January 1996 till August 1998 Nelson served as president and board member of the company.

== Office Depot ==
Nelson began his career at Office Depot as president. On July 18, 2000, he was named CEO, succeeding David Fuente. On December 30, 2001, Nelson was named chairman of the board. On October 4, 2004, Nelson's immediate resignation from his posts was announced.

| Preceded by David Fuente | CEO of office depot 2000–2004 | Succeeded by Neil R. Austrian (interim) |
