= Convention of American Instructors of the Deaf =

The Convention of American Instructors of the Deaf (CAID) is an "organization for all teachers, administrators, educational interpreters, residential personnel, and other concerned professionals involved in education of the deaf". The CAID held its first convention on August 28, 1850, in New York City, New York, at Washington Heights. The second Convention was held the next year, in 1851, in Hartford, Connecticut, and the third Convention was held two years after that, in 1853, in Columbus, Ohio. The fourth Convention met in 1856 in Staunton, Virginia. The Convention continued to meet every couple of years, then became formally incorporated during its Fourteenth meeting, in 1895, in Flint, Michigan.

== Annual conventions ==
- First Convention, New York, August 28–30, 1850.
- Second Convention, Hartford, Connecticut, August 10–12, 1851.
- Third Convention, Columbus, Ohio, August 10–12, 1853.
- Fourth Convention, Staunton, Virginia, August 13–15, 1856.
- Fifth Convention, Jacksonville, Illinois, August 10–12, 1858.
- Sixth Convention (was not held, due to the Civil War, however the First Conference of American Principals and Superintendents, which was held in Washington, D.C. in 1868 was later designated as being the "Sixth Convention").
- Seventh Convention, Indianapolis, Indiana, August 24–26, 1870.
- Eighth Convention, Belleville, Ontario, July 15–20, 1874.
- Ninth Convention, Columbus, Ohio, August 17–22, 1878.
- Tenth Convention, Jacksonville, Illinois, August 26–30, 1882.
- Eleventh Convention, Berkeley, California, July 15–22, 1886.
- Twelfth Convention, New York, August 23–27, 1890.
- Proceedings of the Thirteenth Convention of the American Instructors of the Deaf, held at Chicago, Illinois, July 17, 19, 21, and 24, 1893. (Gallaudet library has a copy, accession no. 26750.)
- Sixteenth Convention, Buffalo, New York, July 2–8, 1901.
- Eighteenth Convention, Ogden, Utah, July 4–10, 1908.
- Twentieth Convention, Staunton, Virginia, June 25–July 1, 1914.
- Twenty-First Convention, Hartford, Connecticut, June 29-July 4, 1917. (Contains notable speech by philosopher John Dewey on pp. 49–53 = PDF pp. 56–60)
- Twenty-Second Convention, Philadelphia, Pennsylvania, June 28-July 3, 1920.
- Twenty-Fifth Meeting of the Convention of American Instructors of the Deaf, Columbus, Ohio, July 1, 1927. Percival Hall paper, "A Greater Gallaudet".
- 1939 CAID
- Twenty-Seventh Meeting of the Convention of American Instructors of the Deaf, Winnipeg, Manitoba, Canada, June 22 to 26, 1931
- Forty-first, Washington DC, 1963 convention
- CAID proceedings (Hartford, CT, 1967)
- Forty-fourth, Berkeley 1969 CAID convention
- Forty-sixth, Indianapolis, Indiana, 1973 convention
- First — New York, N.Y., August 28–30, 1850.
- Second — Hartford, Conn., August 27–29, 1851.
- Third — Columbus, Ohio, August 10–12, 1853.
- Fourth — Staunton, Va., August 13–15, 1856.
- Fifth — Jacksonville, Ill., August 10–12, 1858.
- Sixth — Washington, D.C., May 12–16, 1868. (Also called the First Conference of Superintendents and Principals of American Schools for the Deaf.)
- Seventh — Indianapolis, Ind., August 24–26, 1870.
- Eighth — Belleville, Ontario, July 15–20, 1874
- Ninth — Columbus, Ohio, August 17–22, 1878.
- Tenth — Jacksonville, Ill., August 26–30, 1882.
- Eleventh — Berkeley, Calif., July 15–23, 1886.
- Twelfth — New York, N.Y., August 23–27, 1890.
- Thirteenth — Chicago, Ill., July 17, 19, 21, 24, 1893.
- Fourteenth — Flint, Mich., July 2–8, 1895.
- Fifteenth — Columbus, Ohio, July 28–August 2, 1898.
- Sixteenth — Buffalo, N.Y., July 2–8, 1901.
- Seventeenth — Morganton, N.C., July 8–13, 1905.
- Eighteenth — Ogden, Utah, July 4–10, 1908.
- Nineteenth — Delavan Wis., July 6–13, 1911.
- Twentieth — Staunton, Va., June 25–July 1, 1914.
- Twenty-first — Hartford, Conn., June 29 — July 3, 1917.
- Twenty-second — Mount Airy, Pa., June 28–July 3, 1920.
- Twenty-third — Belleville, Ontario, June 25–30, 1923.
- Twenty-fourth — Council Bluffs, Iowa, June 29-July 4, 1925.
- Twenty-fifth — Columbus, Ohio, June 27–July 1, 1927.
- Twenty-sixth — Faribault, Minn., June 17–21, 1929.
- Twenty-seventh — Winnipeg, Manitoba, June 22–26, 1931.
- Thirty-fourth — Jacksonville, Illinois, June 19-24, 1949
- Thirty-seventh — West Hartford, Connecticut, June 26-July 01, 1955
- Forty-fourth — Berkeley, California, June 20-27, 1969
- Forty-Fifth — Little Rock, Ark., June 25-July 2, 1971
- Forty-Sixth — Indianapolis, Indiana, June 24-29, 1973

== See also ==
- Internet Archive
- Proceedings of the World's Congress of the Deaf and the Report of the Fourth Convention of the National Association of the Deaf, July 18, 20 and 22nd, 1893. (Note: Timberlake's note on page iv is incorrect. This volume is *not* the Proceedings of the Thirteenth Convention of American Instructors of the Deaf.)
- The Conventions of American Instructors of the Deaf, 1850-1893, V. Supplement, in: Fay, Edward Allen. 1893. Histories of American schools for the deaf, 1817–1893.
- Proceedings of the (Gallaudet) Sixth National Conference of Superintendents and Principals, Jackson, Mississippi, April 14–17, 1888.
- Ninth Conference of Superintendents and Principals of American Schools for the Deaf, St. Louis, Missouri, 1904.
- THIRTY-SIXTH CONVENTION OF THE CONFERENCE OF EXECUTIVES OF AMERICAN SCHOOLS FOR THE DEAF, Hartford, Connecticut, APRIL 12–17, 1964.
- Proceedings of the Forty-Second Meeting of the Conference of Executives of American schools for the Deaf (St. Augustine, Florida, 1970)
- Proceedings of the Forty-Fourth Meeting of the Conference of Executives of American schools for the Deaf (Toronto, Ontario, Canada, April 1972)
- Proposed constitution and bylaws revision of the Conference of Executives of American schools for the Deaf (1980)
- Conference Of Executives of American Schools for the Deaf (36th, Riverside, California, April 12 -17, 1964). American School For The Deaf., West Hartford, Conn.
- 1868 1st—Gallaudet College, Washington, D.C.
- 1872 2nd—Michigan School for the Deaf, Flint, Mich.
- 1876 3rd—Mount Airy School for the Deaf, Philadelphia, Pa.
- 1880 4th—The Clarke School for the Deaf, Northampton, Mass.
- 1884 5th—Minnesota School for the Deaf, Faribault, Minn.
- 1888 6th—Mississippi School for the Deaf, Jackson, Miss.
- 1892 7th—Colorado School for the Deaf and the Blind, Colorado Springs, Colo.
- 1900 8th—Alabama School for the Deaf, Talladega, Ala.
- 1904 9th—Department of international Congresses of the Universal Exposition, Halls of Congresses on the Exposition Grounds, St. Louis, Mo.
- 1913 10th—Indiana School for the Deaf, Indianapolis, Ind.
- 1919 11th—Ohio School for the Deaf, Columbus, Ohio
- 1924 12th—Florida School for the Deaf and the Blind, St. Augustine, Fla.
- 1926 13th—Maryland School for the Deaf, Frederick, Md.
- 1928 14th—Tennessee School for the Deaf, Knoxville, Tenn.
- 1930 15th—Colorado School for the Deaf, Colorado Springs, Colo.
- 1933 16th—New Jersey School for the Deaf, West Trenton, N.J., International Congress on the Education of the Deaf.
- 1936 17th—Western Pennsylvania Schoolfor the Deaf, Edgewood, Pittsburgh, Pa.
- 1939 18th—Gallaudet College, Washington, D.C.
- 1944 19th—Western Pennsylvania School for the Deaf, Edgewood, Pittsburgh, Pa.
- 1948 20th—Minnesota School for the Deaf, Faribault, Minn.
- 1949 21st—Illinois School for the Deaf, Jacksonville, Ill.
- 1950 22nd—Colorado School for the Deaf, Colorado Springs, Colo.
- 1951 23rd—Missouri School for the Deaf, Fulton, Mo.
- 1952 24th Arkansas School for the Deaf, Little Rock, Ark.
- 1953 25th—Washington School for the Deaf, Vancouver, Was
- 1954 26th—New Mexico School for the Deaf, Santa Fe, N. Mex.
- 1955 27th—American School for the Deaf, West Hartford, Conn.
- 1956 28th—Mississippi School for the Deaf, Jackson, Miss.
- 1957 29th—Tennessee School for the Deaf, Knoxville, Tenn.
- 1958 30th—Clarke School for the Deaf, Northampton, Mass.
- 1959 31st—Colorado School for the Deaf, Colorado Springs, Colo.
- 1960 32nd—Northwestern University, Evanston, Ill.
- 1961 33rd—Oregon School for the Deaf, Salem, Oreg.
- 1962 34th—Texas School for the Deaf, Austin, Texas
- 1963 35th—Manger Hamilton Hotel, Washington, D. C.
- 1964 36th—California School for the Deaf, Riverside, Calif.
