= Carl T. Nelson =

American football player and coach (1900–1978)

Biographical details
- Born: December 23, 1900; Butte, Montana, U.S.
- Died: January 21, 1978 (aged 77); Beloit, Wisconsin, U.S.

Playing career

Football
- 1919–1923: Beloit

Coaching career (HC unless noted)

Football
- 1925–1944: Geneva HS (IL)
- 1945–1949: Beloit Memorial HS (WI)
- 1950–1961: Beloit
- 1962–1964: Milton

Track
- 1950–1962: Beloit
- 1962–?: Milton

Administrative career (AD unless noted)
- 1965–1967: Milton

Head coaching record
- Overall: 70–46–1 (college football); 125–56–20 (high school football)

Accomplishments and honors

Championships
- Football; 2 Gateway (1962, 1964)

Carl T. "Pill" Nelson (December 23, 1900 – January 21, 1978) was an American football player and coach. He served as the head football coach at Beloit College in Beloit, Wisconsin from 1950 to 1961 and Milton College in Milton, Wisconsin from 1962 to 1964, compiling a career college football coaching record of 70–46–1. Nelson also the athletic director at Milton from 1965 until his retirement in 1967. He also coached track and golf at the school.

Nelson was born on December 23, 1900, in Butte, Montana, to Charles and Sophia Abrahamson Nelson. He attended Butte High School before going to Beloit College, where he played football.

Nelson on January 21, 1978, at Beloit Memorial Hospital in Beloit.

== Head coaching record ==
=== College football ===
Year	Team	Overall	Conference	Standing	Bowl/playoffs
Beloit Buccaneers (Midwest Conference) (1950–1961)
1950	Beloit	5–2–1	4–2	T–4th	
1951	Beloit	7–1			
1952	Beloit	8–0			
1953	Beloit	6–2			
1954	Beloit	2–6			
1955	Beloit	7–1			
1956	Beloit	6–2			
1957	Beloit	3–4			
1958	Beloit	2–6			
1959	Beloit	4–4	4–4	T–4th	
1960	Beloit	1–7	1–7	10th	
1961	Beloit	2–6	2–6	8th	
Beloit:		53–41–1			
Milton Wildcats (Gateway Conference) (1962–1964)
1962	Milton	5–1	3–1	T–1st	
1963	Milton	6–2	2–1–1 (Note: Milton and Lakeland split two head-to-head games in 1963, which counted as a tie for both teams in the conference standings.)	T–2nd	
1964	Milton	6–2	4–0	1st	
Milton:		17–5	9–2–1		
Total:		70–46–1			
National championship Conference title Conference division title or championship game berth
