= Roy Nelson (disambiguation) =

Roy Nelson (born 1976) is an American mixed martial artist.

Roy Nelson may also refer to:

- Roy Nelson (cartoonist) (1905–1956), American cartoonist and caricaturist
- Roy Edgar Nelson (1925–2012), Canadian politician
- John Doyle (comedian) (born 1953), who uses the pseudonym Roy Nelson, member of the comedy duo Roy and HG
