= Nick Nelson =

Nick or Nicholas Nelson may refer to:

- Nick Nelson (American football) (born 1996), American football cornerback
- Nick Nelson (baseball) (born 1995), American baseball pitcher
- Nicholas Nelson (footballer) (born 1998), Jamaican footballer
- Nicholas H. Nelson, member of the Maryland House of Delegates
- Nick Nelson (Heartstopper), a character from the graphic novel Heartstopper
