= Ricky Nelson (baseball) =

American baseball player (1959–2021)

- Outfielder
- Born: May 8, 1959; Eloy, Arizona, U.S.
- Died: November 19, 2021 (aged 62); Phoenix, Arizona, U.S.
- Batted: Left Threw: Right

MLB debut
- May 17, 1983, for the Seattle Mariners

Last MLB appearance
- August 2, 1986, for the Seattle Mariners

MLB statistics
- Batting average: .247
- Home runs: 6
- Runs Batted In: 39
- Stats at Baseball Reference

Teams
- Seattle Mariners (1983–1986)

Ricky Lee Nelson (May 8, 1959 – November 19, 2021) was an American professional baseball outfielder who played for the Seattle Mariners of Major League Baseball (MLB) from 1983 to 1986.

== Career ==
Nelson attended Arizona State University and was selected by Seattle in the 1981 MLB draft. He made his MLB debut on May 17, 1983, against the California Angels. His most productive MLB season came in 1983, when he registered 291 at-bats in 98 games, recording a .254 batting average. He made his final MLB appearance on August 2, 1986, at the Kingdome, appearing as a pinch runner in a 7-3 Seattle victory over the California Angels.

In his 123-game major league career, Nelson batted .247, with six home runs, 39 runs batted in, 38 runs scored, 79 hits, 13 doubles, 3 triples and 8 stolen bases. In 2001, Nelson managed the Oakland Athletics' entry in the Arizona Fall League to the league championship.

== Death ==
He died from COVID-19 pneumonia on November 19, 2021, at the age of 62.
