= Bryan Nelson (ornithologist) =

British ornithologist, environmental activist and academic

Bryan Nelson MBE FRSE
- Born: Joseph Bryan Nelson; 14 March 1932; Shipley, West Yorkshire, England
- Died: 29 June 2015 (aged 83); Kirkcudbright, Dumfries and Galloway, Scotland
- Education: University of St Andrews; University of Oxford
- Occupations: Ornithologist and academic
- Spouse: June Nelson nee. Davison (m.1960–2015, his death)
- Children: 2

Joseph Bryan Nelson MBE FRSE (14 March 1932 – 29 June 2015) was a British ornithologist, environmental activist and academic. He was a prominent authority on seabirds, publishing numerous books and articles on gannets, cormorants and other species, teaching zoology at the University of Aberdeen, and conducting pioneering ornithological research in Jordan, Christmas Island and the Galápagos Islands. Nelson was "acclaimed as the world's leading expert on the northern gannet". He also contributed to the creation of Christmas Island National Park, which helped to preserve the habitat of the endangered Abbott's booby.

== Early life and education ==
Nelson was born in Shipley, West Yorkshire in 1932, the third of four children of a motor engineer and a draper. For most of his life, he was known by his middle name, Bryan. As a child during World War II, he developed a fascination with birds after he was given a book on ornithology. He attended a grammar school in the town of Saltaire, but left school at 16 and worked for some years in a sewage treatment plant to help support his family. After completing his studies at a night school, Nelson attended St Andrews University to study zoology, graduating in 1959. Thereafter, he began a DPhil in ecology at Oxford University, entitled The breeding biology of the gannet (Sula bassana) with particular reference to behaviour, under the supervision of the Nobel Prize-winning Dutch biologist Nikolaas Tinbergen.

In 1960, Nelson married his research colleague June Davison, who accompanied him to Bass Rock in the Firth of Forth to study gannets. The couple spent their honeymoon on Bass Rock, and subsequently lived there in a garden shed from 1960 to 1963. Without insulation and held down against the wind by hawsers, the shed was erected with the aid of local lighthouse keepers, and "sat eerily within the ruins of the sixth-century St Baldred's chapel." They endured harsh coastal weather and regularly climbed down steep cliffs without safety equipment to study birds' nests.

== Ornithological research ==
After completing his DPhil in 1963, Nelson travelled with his wife to several uninhabited islands in the Galápagos Islands to continue his research on seabirds, primarily studying blue-footed, masked and red-footed boobies. The couple lived in a tent and "eschewed clothes" while studying the booby and frigate-bird populations of the islands. At one point, Prince Philip, Duke of Edinburgh visited the islands, and invited the Nelsons to lunch aboard the Royal Yacht Britannia; (Note: "Having heard of this intrepid couple, the Duke of Edinburgh, President of the WWF (now the World Wide Fund for Nature), ordered the royal yacht Britannia to drop anchor off the Galapagos.") Nelson recalled attending the lunch "in patched shorts liberally splattered with albatross vomit". Prince Philip, also a seabird enthusiast, took some of Nelson's research diaries back to England with him to keep them safe from Ecuadorian customs officials, and later returned them to Nelson at Buckingham Palace.

In 1967, Nelson spent a year on Christmas Island, studying the rare Abbott's booby, (Note: The "then unknown, jungle tree-top nesting Abbott’s booby which breeds nowhere else in the world...") whose only habitat was threatened by phosphate mining on the island. In later years, Nelson gave evidence to the Australian government about the ecological impacts of mining on Christmas Island, which ultimately contributed to the creation of Christmas Island National Park to protect the island's biodiversity. In 1968, Nelson and his wife travelled to Jordan, where he was the director of the Azraq Desert Research Station and studied the migratory birds of the region. He also studied a colony of Australasian gannets at Cape Kidnappers, New Zealand.

Nelson conducted pioneering fieldwork on the habits and communication methods of gannets and boobies; among his key hypotheses was the suggestion that gannets use a gesture known as "skypointing" to warn mates that they are about to leave the nest. As Scottish Field Magazine noted: "He interpreted and described the fascinating non-verbal communication of gannets. As a zoology lecturer, he amused and inspired thousands of Aberdeen University students over many years with his 'skypointing' and 'beak fencing'." He was the author of an authoritative 1,000-page monograph on boobies and gannets, including a volume on Pelecaniformes and a more general volume on seabird biology and ecology.

== Academic career ==
In 1969, Nelson became a lecturer in zoology at Aberdeen University, and taught there until his retirement in 1985. He published a number of highly regarded ornithological monographs and textbooks, appeared on numerous television and radio programmes, made several nature documentaries and helped pioneer high-speed photography techniques for imaging birds in flight. He furthermore wrote a number of books for general audiences, including a 2013 memoir of his time on the Galápagos Islands. He became a Fellow of the Royal Society of Edinburgh in 1982 and was appointed MBE in 2006.

He was also a key founder and important supporter of the Scottish Seabird Centre, of which he was a charity trustee from 1997 to 2012. In 2013 he was appointed as the centre's Special Ornithological Advisor. The centre flew its flag at half mast upon his death.

== Personal life ==
Nelson married June Davison in 1960; she survived him, as did their twin son and daughter. Nelson spent most of his later years in Scotland, latterly in the town of Kirkcudbright, and enjoyed boating, hill walking and birdwatching in his spare time.

Nelson died of a genetic heart defect at his home in Kirkcudbright in June 2015. Nelson's "green burial" was conducted at Roucan Loch outside Dumfries. He outlived all three of his siblings.

== Selected published works ==
- Azraq: Desert Oasis. Athens: Ohio University Press, 1974. Penguin Books, 1973, ISBN 0-7139-0475-5
- The Sulidae: Gannets and Boobies. Oxford: Published for the University of Aberdeen by Oxford University Press. 1978. ISBN 978-0-19-714104-5.
- The Gannet. Berkhamsted: T & A.D. Poyser. 1978. ISBN 978-0-85661-021-9. (Note: "There are certain birds, or often groups of birds, which are associated with an individual researcher.... For members of the Sulidae, the gannets and boobies the name is Dr. J Bryan Nelson ... Since 1964, when his first publication on Connex appeared, Dr. Nelson has studied almost all species of the genus Sula." The books were characterized as a "twin tour de force" that should be ranked among classic ornothological studies.)
  - The Gannet. City: Shire Publications, 1999, ISBN 978-0-7478-0018-7
- Living with Seabirds. Edinburgh: A&W Publishers Inc, Edinburgh University Press. 1987 [1980]. ISBN 978-0-85224-523-1. (Note: Originally published as Seabirds: Their biology and ecology. London/New York: Hamlyn, 1980, ISBN 978-0-600-38227-0.)
- The Atlantic Gannet. Great Yarmouth: Fenix Books Ltd, Norfolk, 2002, ISBN 0-9541191-0-X
- Pelicans, cormorants and their relatives: Pelecanidae, Sulidae, Phalacrocoracidae, Anhingidae, Fregatidae, Phaethontidae (also: Pelicans, Cormorants and their Allies). Oxford: Oxford University Press, 2005, ISBN 0-19-857727-3
- On the Rocks. Langtoft, Lincolnshire, England: Langford Press. 11 May 2013. ISBN 978-1-904078-56-2. (Note: This book is an autobiographical account of Nelson and his wife's time on Bass Rock, and includes the first known photograph of an Abbott’s booby on page 115.)
