= Sarah Jane Nelson =

American actress and singer/songwriter

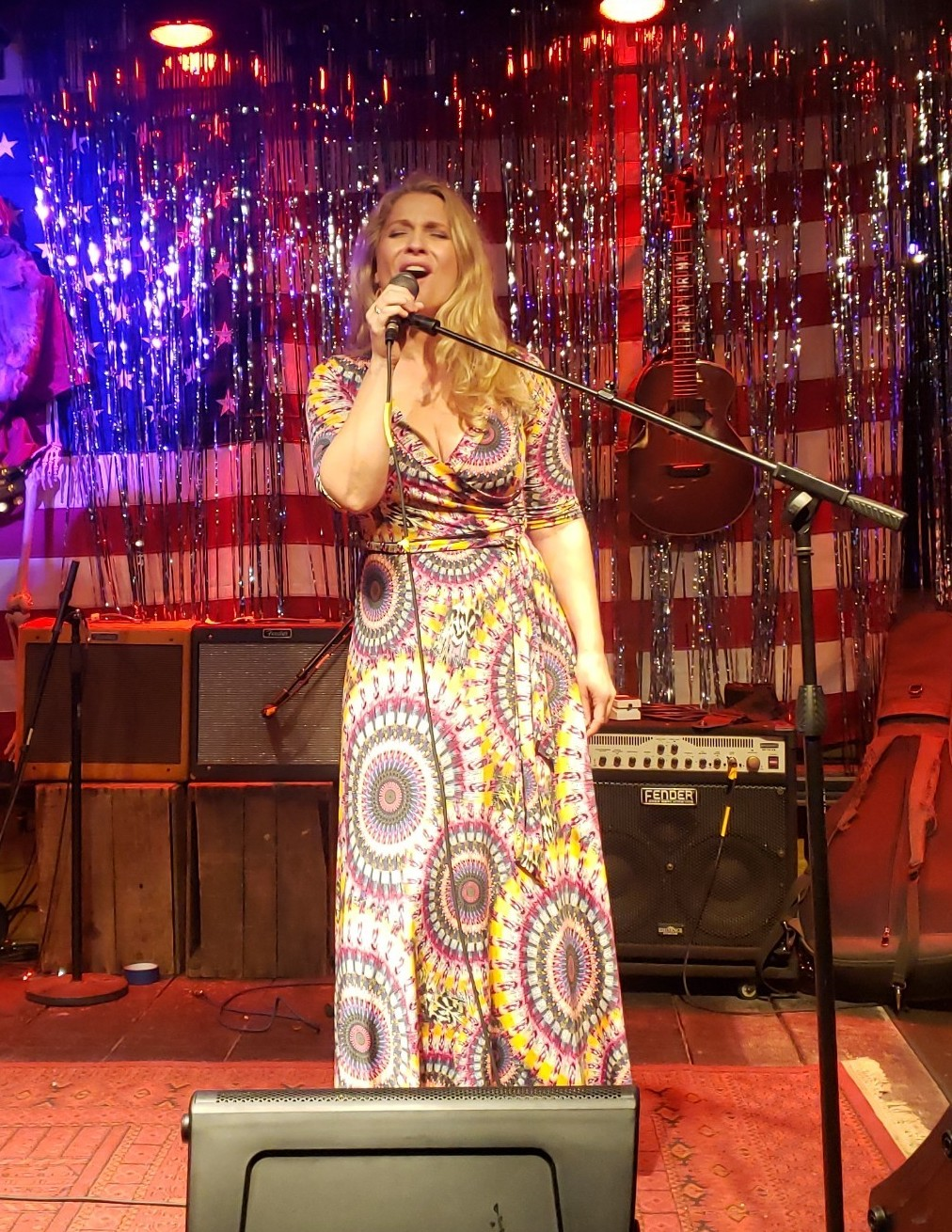
- Nelson performing Live at Puckett’s of Leiper’s Fork

Background information
- Born: Little Rock, Arkansas
- Origin: Nashville, Tennessee
- Genres: Folk, country, Americana, blues, jazz
- Occupations: Singer-songwriter, Actress
- Years active: 2000–present
- Label: Independent
- Website: www.sarahjanenelson.com

Sarah Jane Nelson is an American actress, singer and songwriter from Little Rock, Arkansas. She is known for her Broadway and off-Broadway productions, as well as in more recent years her singer/songwriter career. Nelson's original song "Reap What You Sow" was featured on “5 Songs You Need to Hear” by Wide Open Country.

== Career ==
=== Acting ===
Nelson moved to New York City and performed in numerous regional theater productions including The Canterbury Tales at The Guthrie Theater in Minneapolis, The Who’s Tommy at North Shore Music Theater, Beehive at Arkansas Rep and SUNY Purchase, and an extended, sold-out run of It Ain't Nothin' But the Blues at The Prince Music Theater in Philadelphia. She was also in the original off-Broadway casts of Radiant Baby at The Public Theater (directed by George C. Wolfe) and Dream a Little Dream: The Mamas and Papas Musical (directed by Randal Myler and starring Denny Doherty). (23)

On Broadway, Nelson made her Broadway debut in The Green Bird, directed by Julie Taymor. She then went on to star in Swing! On Broadway and in the first National Tour which premiered at the Ahmanson Theatre in Los Angeles.

In television Nelson guest starred as the murderous, con artist, Lori King on The District on CBS and played a nurse on the ABC series Nashville (2012 TV series) She has also appeared in numerous short films, and the podcast series Boom.

=== Music ===
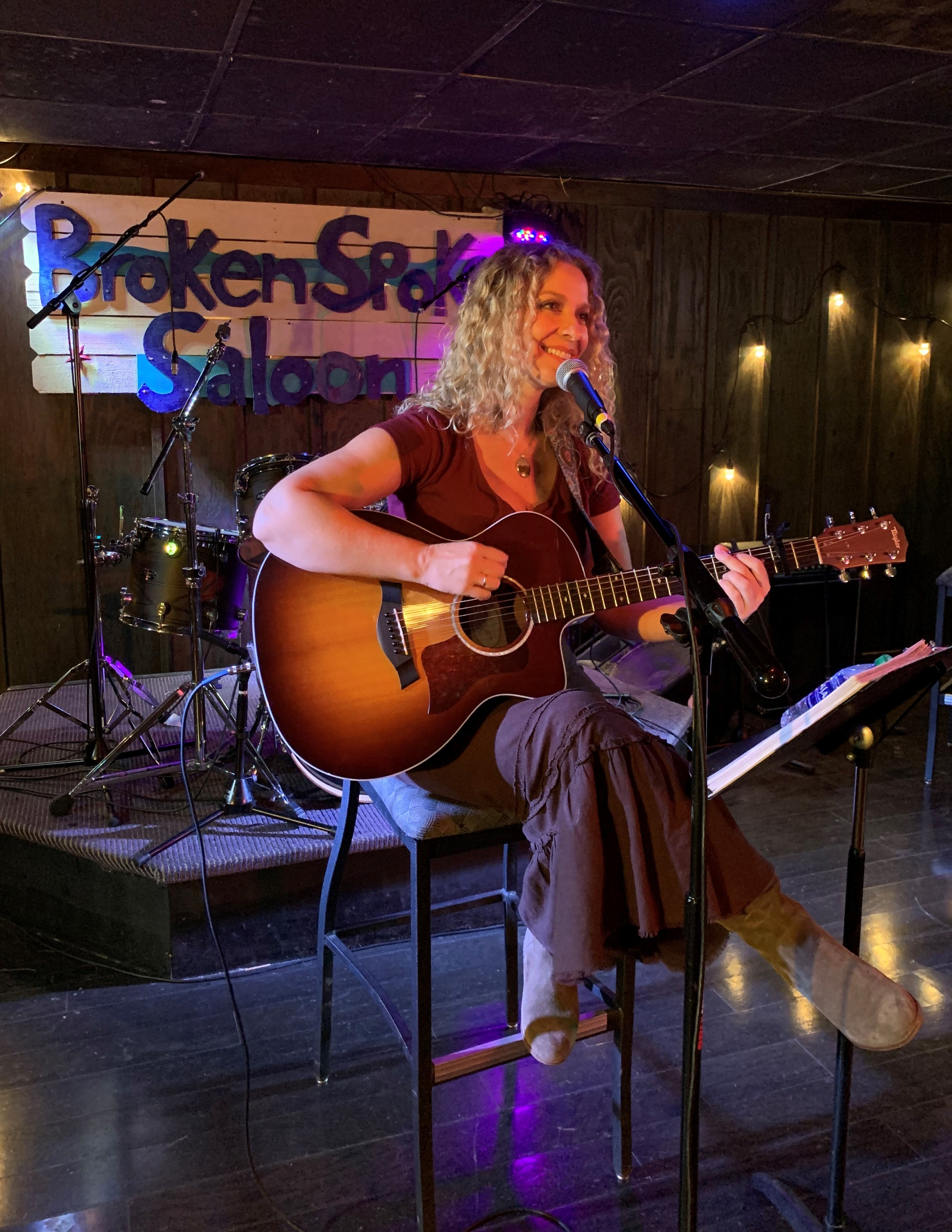
Nelson performing a songwriter’s night at the Broken Spoke Saloon in Nashville.

Nelson's first appearance performing her original music was as the winner of the premiere episode of The Next Big Star with host, Ed MacMahon in 2001. Nelson has since released five studio albums. Her first three, A Little Bit of Everything, Saving Grace, and Wild Women Don't Get the Blues were recorded in Ashland, Oregon with producer Tom Freeman. Her next two albums, A Christmas Wish and I'm Not Broken, were produced and recorded at Monster Studios in Nashville, Tennessee with Brian Irwin.

Nelson's original song, "Reap What You Sow" from the album, I'm Not Broken was listed as one of the “5 Songs You Need to Hear” by Wide Open Country.

Nelson performs regularly at The Bluebird Cafe in Nashville. where she shares her new songs in development. She opened for Josh Turner at Britt Festival.

=== Jewelry ===
In 2006, Nelson started Life Is Rosey Jewelry, an Etsy shop. The collection features handmade sterling silver, gold, copper and bronze necklaces and guitar picks. Each handmade piece is stamped with meaningful words and phrases. In 2015, the Life is Rosey jewelry collection moved to her own site.

== Personal life ==
Nelson was born in Little Rock, Arkansas. Nelson grew up singing gospel and blues music and performing in musical theater productions where she was one of the founding members of The Young Troupe at the Strauss Theater. Nelson won the title of America's Miss T.E.E.N. 1994 and moved to New York City at age 17 to pursue her career. In her free time, Nelson writes songs with incarcerated men and women in the Davidson Country Jail (Redemption Songs) and mentally ill patients in a residential mental health treatment facility in Franklin, TN.
