= Nels H. Nelson =

United States Marine Corps Major general

Nels Herning Nelson
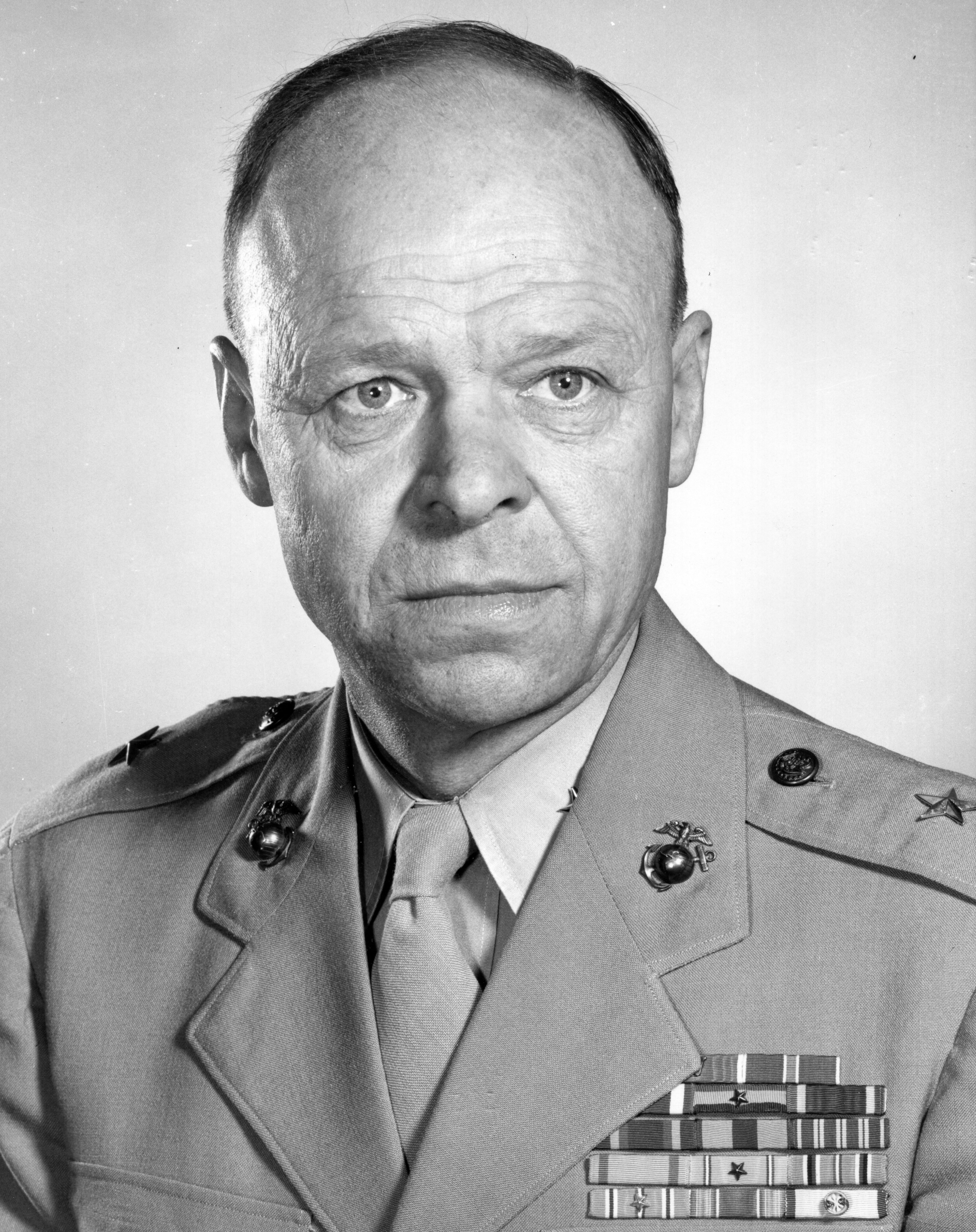
- BG Nels H. Nelson, USMC
- Born: April 5, 1903; Irene, South Dakota, US
- Died: April 25, 1973 (aged 70); Fairfax, Virginia, US
- Burial place: Arlington National Cemetery
- Military career
- Allegiance: United States
- Branch: United States Marine Corps
- Service years: 1926–1956
- Rank: Major general
- Service number: 0-4071
- Commands: Landing Force Training Unit, Pacific
- Conflicts: Haitian Campaign; Nicaraguan Campaign; Yangtze Patrol; World War II: Bougainville Campaign; Recapture of Guam; Battle of Peleliu; Battle of Okinawa
- Awards: Legion of Merit; Bronze Star Medal; Navy Commendation Medal

Nels Herning Nelson (April 5, 1903 – April 25, 1973) was a decorated officer in the United States Marine Corps with the rank of major general. A veteran of several expeditionary tours and World War II, Nelson gained reputation as one of the Corps' top experts in communications.

== Early years ==
Nels H. Nelson was born on April 5, 1903, in Irene, South Dakota, as the son of Jens Nelson and Anna Christensen. Following a graduation from the high school in summer of 1921, he enrolled the Dakota Wesleyan University in Mitchell, South Dakota. Nelson completed one year there, before received an appointment to the United States Naval Academy at Annapolis, Maryland, in June 1922.

Nelson graduated on June 3, 1926, with bachelor's degree and was commissioned second lieutenant in the Marine Corps. He was subsequently ordered to the Basic School at Philadelphia Navy Yard for basic officer training, which he completed in February 1927. Nelson then served with Marine Barracks at the Naval Submarine Base New London, Connecticut and Marine Barracks at Naval Air Station Pensacola, Florida, before sailed for expeditionary duty to China.

He returned to the United States in early 1929 and embarked for Nicaragua in April of that year. Nelson served with 2nd Marine Brigade under Brigadier General Dion Williams until June 1930, when he was ordered back to the United States and for duty at Marine Barracks, New York Navy Yard.

In August 1931, Nelson was transferred to the Army Signal School at Fort Monmouth, New Jersey, where he completed the signal course in June of the following year. He was subsequently stationed at Headquarters Marine Corps in Washington, D.C., and Marine Corps Base San Diego, before he embarked for Haiti in May 1933.

Nelson was attached to the staff of 1st Marine Brigade under Brigadier General Louis M. Little. He was stationed at Port-au-Prince and served simultaneously as Brigade Signal Officer and Officer-in-Charge of Haitian government radio, telephone and international communications system. For his service in this capacity, Nelson was decorated with Haitian National Order of Honour and Merit, rank Officer.

He returned to the United States in August 1934 and assumed duty as an instructor at the Basic School at Philadelphia Navy Yard. Nelson taught newly commissioned Marine officers there until August 1936, when he was ordered to the Marine Corps Schools, Quantico for Junior Course, which he completed the course in May 1937 and returned to the Marine Corps Base San Diego.

In September of that year, Nelson departed for China and served as Communications officer of 4th Marine Regiment under Colonel Charles F. B. Price. He was stationed at Shanghai International Settlement during the period of tensions between Japan and China and distinguished himself in his capacity. Nelson received a Letter of Commendation from the Commander-in-Chief, Asiatic Fleet, Admiral Thomas C. Hart for "exercising considerable tact, judgement and initiative in preserving the security of the resident and their property from internal disorders."

== World War II ==
Following his return to the United States in July 1940, Nelson was attached to the Headquarters Marine Corps in Washington, D.C., and served as communications materiel assistant to the Quartermaster General, Seth Williams and as officer-in-charge of the Signal Supply Division.

Nelson remained in that capacity until July 1943, when he was ordered to South Pacific and joined the staff of I Marine Amphibious Corps under Major General Alexander A. Vandegrift as corps signal officer. While in this capacity, he took part in the Bougainville Campaign in November–December 1943 and received the Navy Commendation Medal for his service.

Upon the redesignation of I Marine Amphibious Corps to III Marine Amphibious Corps (III MAC) in April 1944, Nelson remained in his previous capacity and took part in the recapture of Guam in July of that year. He distinguished himself again and received the Legion of Merit with Combat "V".

Nelson later served with III MAC during the battle of Peleliu in fall 1944 and battle of Okinawa in April–May 1945 and received the Bronze Star Medal for his meritorious service.

== Later service ==
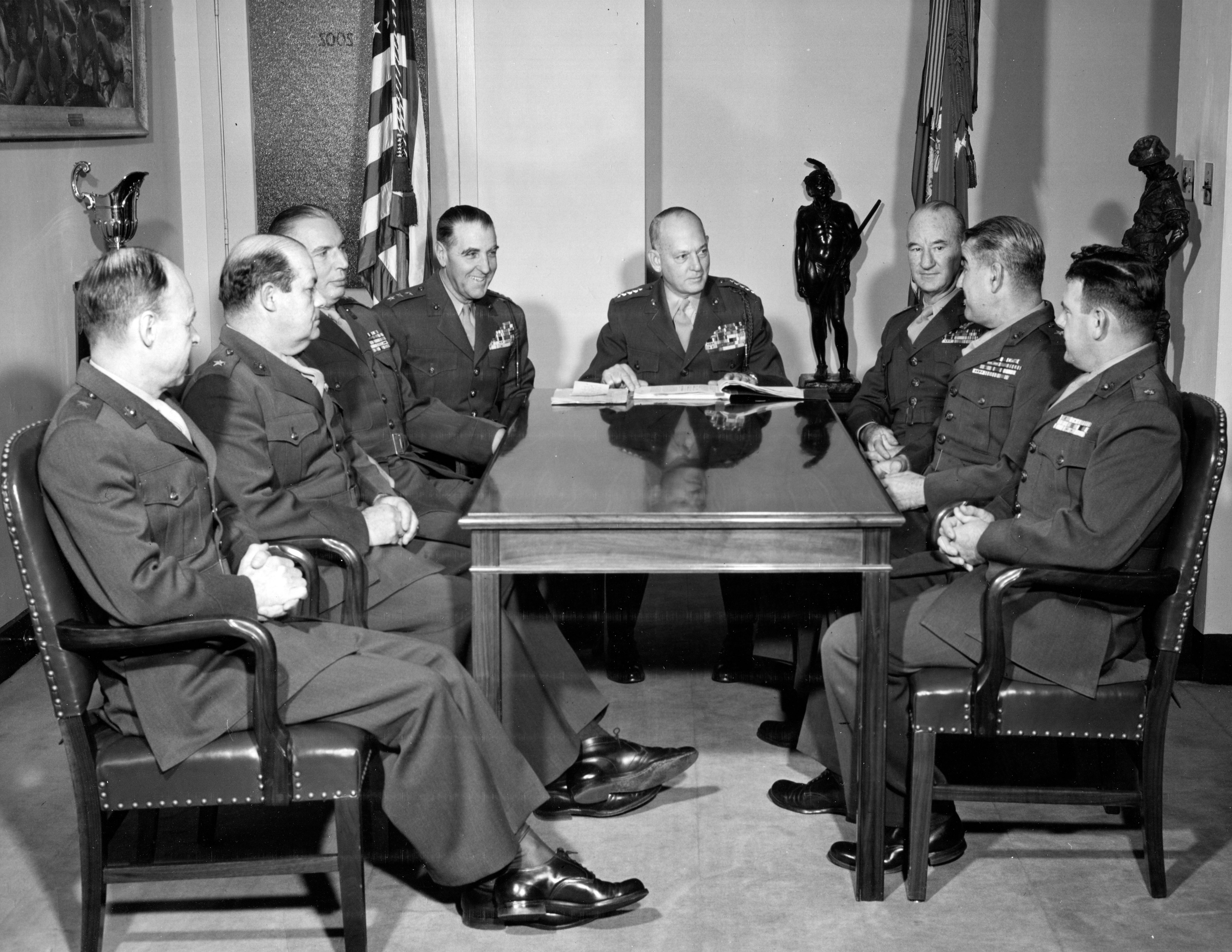
General Nelson (first from left) as Assistant Chief of Staff for Personnel during meeting with Commandant, Lemuel C. Shepherd Jr.

He returned to the United States in September 1945 and reported for duty at Portsmouth Navy Yard, where he was appointed commanding officer of Marine Barracks there. Nelson was appointed commanding officer of the Guard detachment at Naval Prison there in April 1946 and remained in that capacity until August 1947.

Nelson was subsequently ordered to the National War College in Washington, D.C., where he graduated in June 1948 and assumed duty as a member of the General Board of the Navy at the Navy Department.

In June, 1950, Nelson was ordered to San Francisco for duty as director of the 12th Marine Corps Reserve and Recruitment District and had direction over a number of reserve units and recruitment stations. His duty included also inspection of reserve and recruitment units, and to make calls on governors and other public officials.

Nelson was promoted to the rank of brigadier general in August 1952 and ordered to the Headquarters Marine Corps for duty as assistant chief of staff for personnel (G-1). While in this capacity, he was responsible for the planning of budget for personnel matters for all marine forces and its advocating before the congressional committee on appropriations.

In June 1955, Nelson was ordered to Coronado, California, for duty as commanding general, Landing Force Training Unit, Pacific. He was responsible for the amphibious training of Army and Navy forces on the West Coast of the United States until the beginning of July 1956, when he was succeeded by his Naval Academy classmate, Russell N. Jordahl and retired from active duty. Nelson was advanced to the rank of major general on retirement, for having been specially commended in combat.

== Death ==
Major General Nels H. Nelson died on April 25, 1973, in Fairfax, Virginia, and was buried with full military honors at Arlington National Cemetery, Virginia. His wife, Helen Laird Nelson (1902–1989) is buried next to him. They had one daughter.

== Decorations ==
Here is the ribbon bar of Major General Nels H. Nelson:

1st row	Legion of Merit with Combat "V"	Bronze Star Medal	Navy Commendation Medal
2nd row	Navy Presidential Unit Citation with one star	Navy Unit Commendation	Yangtze Service Medal
3rd row	Marine Corps Expeditionary Medal	Second Nicaraguan Campaign Medal	China Service Medal
4th row	American Defense Service Medal with Fleet Clasp	American Campaign Medal	Asiatic-Pacific Campaign Medal with one silver 3/16 inch service star
5th row	World War II Victory Medal	National Defense Service Medal	National Order of Honour and Merit, rank Officer

== See also ==
- Naval Amphibious Base Coronado

Military offices
Preceded by William W. Davies	Commanding General, Landing Force Training Unit, Pacific; June 1, 1955 – July 1, 1956	Succeeded by Russell N. Jordahl
