= Bill Nelson (disambiguation) =

Bill Nelson (born 1942) is the administrator of NASA and former U.S. senator from Florida.

Bill Nelson may also refer to:

== Arts and entertainment ==
- Bill Nelson (artist) (born 1946), illustrator and sculptor
- Bill Nelson (musician) (born 1948), English singer, guitarist and songwriter
- Bill Nelson (sound engineer) (1945–2021), American sound engineer
- Billy Nelson (actor) (1903–1973), American actor
- Billy Bass Nelson (1951–2026), American musician, member of the P-funk All Stars

== Sports ==
- Bill Nelson (American football) (1948–2010), American football defensive tackle
- Bill Nelson (baseball) (1863–1941), American baseball player
- Bill Nelson (sports coach) (active in 1990s), Australian swimming coach

== Others ==
- Bill Nelson (New Hampshire politician) (active 2012–2022)
- Bill Nelson, murder victim who was killed, cooked and eaten by his wife Omaima Nelson
- Desiré Dubounet or Bill Nelson (born 1951), American alternative medicine promoter

== See also ==
- William Nelson (disambiguation)
- William Neilson (disambiguation)
- Bill Nelsen (1941–2019), American football player
