= Musique de l'Artillerie =

Orchestra of the French Army

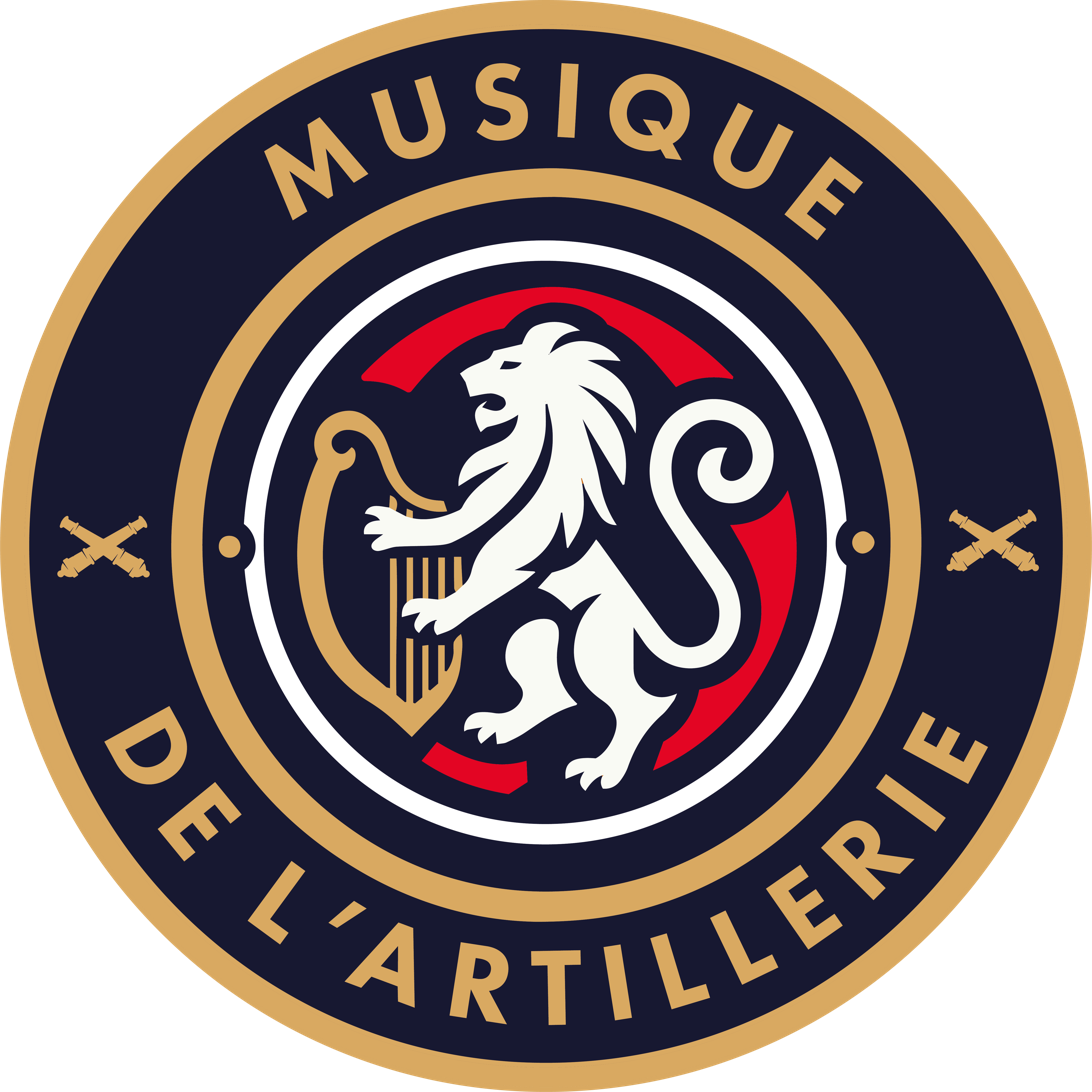
The band during a Bastille Day rehearsal ceremony.

The Musique de l’Artillerie (English: Artillery Band) is an orchestra of French Army falls under the Sud-Est territorial region. It consists of 50 musicians, who perform at official protocol ceremonies as well as public relations events for the Army.

It performs throughout the south-eastern quarter of France participates in national events and events abroad, particularly numerous international festivals. It is located in the Gerland District of Lyon.

== History ==
Deeply rooted in the city of Lyon, the artillery music has been able to cross the ages while adapting to the various reorganizations of the army's music.

In 1757, by royal decree, the "royal-deux-ponts" regiment was created. It was composed of 2,000 infantrymen, among whom were already present hired musicians enlisted by the Duke of Zweibrücken, first corps commander.

On January 1, 1791, by decision of the Constituent Assembly, it lost its royal identity to transform itself into the 99th infantry regiment in which generations of Lyonnais served. Over the years, the regimental music has become part of the local landscape and has followed the various developments of the Army to successively become:

- Music of the GMR5 (regional resources group No. 5)
- Music of the 22nd infantry regiment
- Music of the 22nd infantry battalion
- Music of the South-East Land Region
- Music of the infantry
- Music of the artillery.

Proud of this heritage, the artillery music took its current name on September 1, 2016, the date on which it was integrated into the Army music command. But it is undoubtedly under the name "music of the 9-9" that it remains in the hearts and collective unconscious of all the Rhône-Alpes.

=== Notable activities ===
- The Musique de L’Artillerie gives the Concert of the Military Governor of Lyon every year, for the benefit of army casualties in front of a parterre of 2000 people.
- In August 2011, it took part in the Ystad International Military Tattoo.
- In June 2013, it took part in the Sevastopol International Arts Festival.
- In January 2016, the band accompanied a ceremonial contingent from the 35th Infantry Regiment on the Rajpath in New Delhi for the 67th Indian Republic Day parade.
- In July 2019, the band took part in the Royal Edinburgh Military Tattoo.

== See also ==
- Army Music Command
- Musique des troupes de Marine
- Parachute Band
- French Army Signals Band
- Musique de l'Arme Blindée Cavalerie
- Infantry Band
