= William Nelson =

William Nelson may refer to:

- Bill Nelson (American football) (William Howard Nelson, 1948–2010), American football player
- Bill Nelson (baseball) (William F. Nelson, 1863–1941), American baseball pitcher
- Bill Nelson (musician) (William Nelson, born 1948), English singer, songwriter, producer and musician
- Bill Nelson (sound engineer) (1945–2021), also known as William Nelson, American sound engineer
- Bill Nelson (sports coach) (William Nelson), Australian Olympic swimming coach
- Billy Bass Nelson (1951–2026), American musician
- Billy Nelson (actor) (1903–1979), American vaudeville comedian and actor
- Billy Nelson (runner) (William Andrew Nelson, born 1984), American steeplechaser
- Billy Nelson (boxer), Scottish boxing coach and former boxer
- William Nelson (governor) (1711–1772), American colonial governor of Virginia
- William Nelson Jr. (1754-1813), his son, Virginia politician, professor, lawyer and judge
- William Nelson (British judge) (born c. 1981), British district judge
- William Nelson (MP) (c. 1462–1525), member of parliament for the City of York
- William Nelson (New York politician) (1784–1869), U.S. congressman for New York
- William Nelson (Wisconsin politician) (1839–1913), member of the Wisconsin State Senate
- William Nelson (wrestler), American wrestler who won a bronze medal at the 1904 Olympics
- William Nelson, 1st Earl Nelson (1757–1835), elder brother of Horatio Nelson, 1st Viscount Nelson
- William "Bull" Nelson (1824–1862), Union army general in the American Civil War
- William E. Nelson (died 1991), murdered by his wife Omaima Nelson
- William G. Nelson (fl. 1980s–2020s), American cancer researcher and professor
- Harold Nelson (athlete) (William Harold Nelson, 1923–2011), New Zealand runner
- William L. Nelson (politician) (1875–1946), U.S. congressman for Missouri
- William L. Nelson (Medal of Honor) (1918–1943), World War II Medal of Honor recipient
- William Lambie Nelson (1807–1887), member of the Queensland Legislative Assembly
- William T. Nelson (1908–1994), U.S. Navy rear admiral
- William Rockhill Nelson (1841–1915), American journalist and publisher
- William Nelson (industrialist) (1843–1932), New Zealand farmer and industrialist
- William Nelson (inventor) (died 1903), American inventor killed by own invention

== See also ==
- Bill Nelson (disambiguation)
- Willie Nelson (born 1933), American guitarist, songwriter and country singer
- Willie Nelson (boxer) (born 1987)
- Will Newton Nelson (1897-1953), American farmer and politician
- Billie Nelson (1941–1974), British motorcycle road racer
- William Neilson (disambiguation)
