= Army Music Command =

Music branch of the French Army

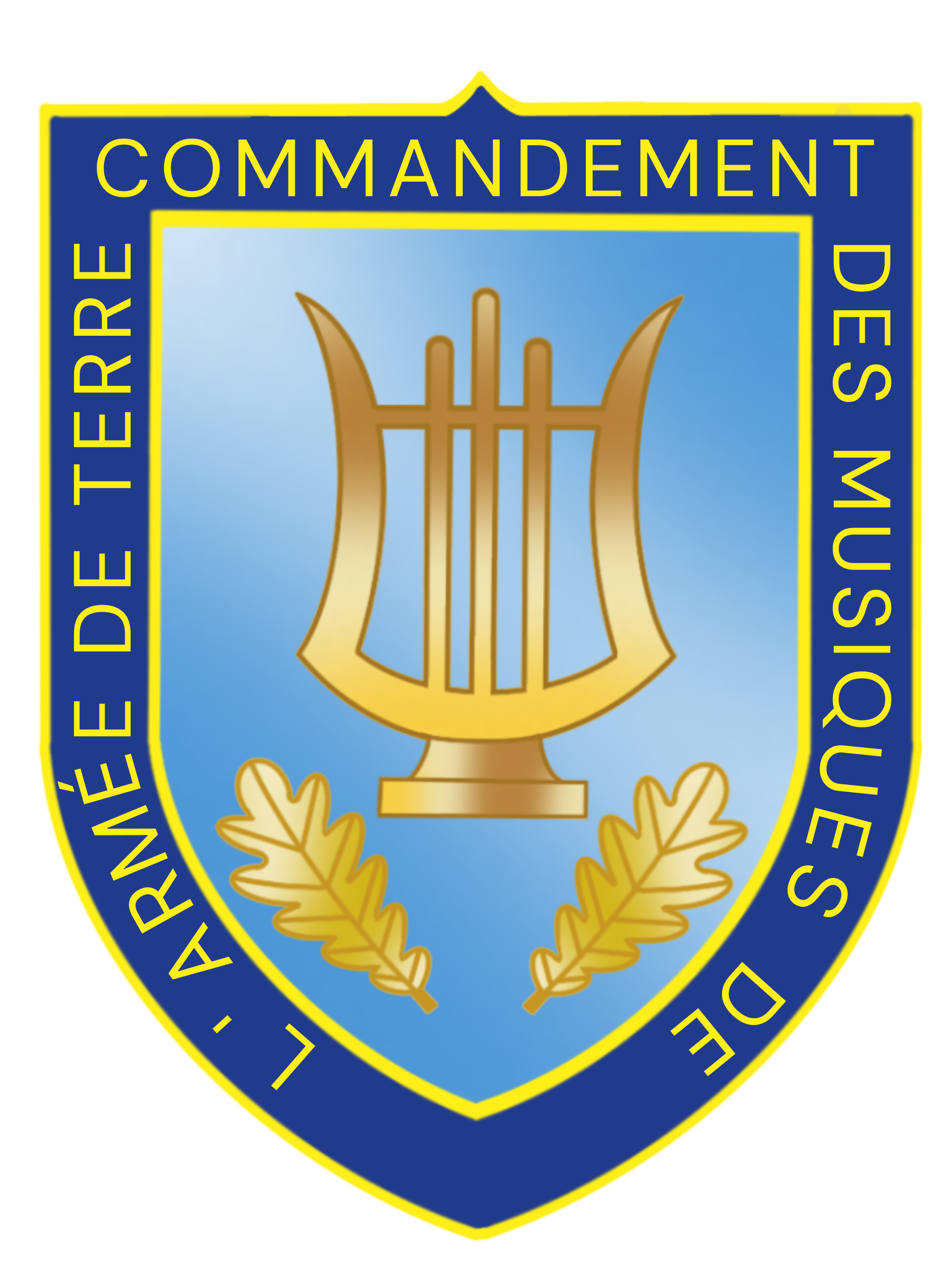
The Army Music Command

The Army Music Command (French: Commandement des Musiques de l’Armée de Terre, COMMAT)) is an organization under the direct authority of the Chief of Staff of the French Army. It is composed of a staff stationed in Versailles and 6 army bands throughout France in the following cities: Lille, Lyon, Metz, Toulouse, Rennes and Versailles.

These 6 bands include the following:

- Marine Band (Versailles)
- Artillery Band (Lyon)
- Signals Band (Rennes)
- Infantry Band (Lille)
- Cavalry and Armored Branch Band (Metz)
- Parachute Band (Toulouse)

The Army Music Command (COMMAT) is responsible for :

- The implementation and use of Army formations,
- The professional training of military musicians,
- The administration, management and operation of attached professional music,
- The specific support of Army musical formations,
- The constitution, preparation and projection of elements for operational missions

In addition, COMMAT's mission is to provide musical support by accompanying the land forces.

== Cavalry and Armored Branch Band ==
Created in 1988 within the 151st Infantry Regiment, the Music of the Armored Cavalry Arm will have various names. Currently stationed in Montigny-lès-Metz in Moselle, and dependent on the Army Music Command of Versailles, it has within it a large harmony orchestra and various small ensembles (wind quintets, brass quintets, clarinet quartets) to respond to the many and diverse performances. The music's mission is to enhance military and patriotic ceremonies and evolves in the civilian environment (concerts, festivals, etc.) both in France and abroad.

== Artillery Band ==
With around fifty musicians, the artillery band provides official and protocol ceremonies, thus constituting a first-rate public relations element, an essential vector of communication for the Army. It naturally shines throughout the south-eastern quarter of France but also in the rest of France, as well as abroad. Its varied repertoire as well as its different configurations allow it to be presented in concert, serenade, parade or march. It is located in the heart of Lyon, in the Gerland district and the artillery park.

== Parachute Band ==
The Toulouse Paratroopers' Band, whose origins date back to 1888, has had various names and numerous restructurings over the course of more than a century. First known as the Terre Sud-Ouest Region Band (1999) and then the Paratroopers' Band (2011), it has been under the authority of the Army Music Command (COMMAT) since 1 September 2016. Its name reinforces its role as ambassador to the airborne troops. Like all Army musical groups, it performs both nationally and internationally to provide a wide range of services. As such, it takes part in national, regional, departmental, garrison and regimental parades (arms festivals, transfers of command, regimental festivals, etc.). It also provides a smaller contingent during honour pickets and individual services (bugler, drummer).

== Infantry Band ==
The Infantry Band is one of the 6 professional musical phalanxes of the Army Music Command. The only Brass Band in the Army, this unique musical formation, particularly popular in the mining basin of northern France, is composed exclusively of instruments from the brass and percussion family. It is made up of 35 professional military musicians, laureates of national conservatories and recruited by competition. Based in Lille, it is the heir to the Music of the 43rd Infantry Regiment. It took the name of Infantry Band on September 1, 2016 as part of a reform of the Army. A worthy representative of the Army, the Infantry Band, in full formation or through the various ensembles that come from it, carries out an average of 150 missions per year: Musical support for military ceremonies of course, but also concerts for the benefit of the wounded of the armies, receptions of high civil and military authorities, dynamic shows during festivals in France and abroad, partnerships with national education and cultural institutions, are some examples that demonstrate the versatility it demonstrates. It also participates in the defense effort of the French army through missions in favor of troops in external operations.

== Signals Band ==
A professional harmony orchestra that shines throughout the great west of France, the Musique des Transmissions is a dynamic group, combining tradition and modernity. Performing in a large orchestra during numerous concerts, the instrumentalists express themselves within various ensembles such as the wind quintet, the brass quintet, the jazz big band, the variety ensemble and the Celtic ensemble.

The missions entrusted to this orchestra evolve around three pillars:

- The ceremonial: by participating in the influence of the Army during military and patriotic ceremonies.
- The civic pillar: by participating in various musical actions in partnership with the civilian world in order to consolidate the link between the Army and the Nation.
- The artistic and cultural pillar: the only professional harmony orchestra in the West zone, the Musique des Transmissions aims to promote and introduce composers and the great works of this repertoire, whether from yesterday or today.

== Marine Band ==
Ambassador of the Army, the Music of the Marine Troops was founded in Rochefort in 1945. Now comprising around fifty musicians, this formation is the main heir to the musical traditions of the Marine Troops, thus contributing to the prestige and reputation of this elite corps. Its missions are structured around three areas: participation in official ceremonies for the highest civil and military authorities of the State, prestigious concerts and international festivals. In order to adapt to the expectations of the public, the Music of the Marine Troops is divided into various formations: large harmony orchestra, but also variety orchestra, large brass ensemble, dixieland ensemble, brass quintet, wind quintet, clarinet and saxophone quartets. Stationed on the Satory plateau in Versailles, this formation is made up of high-level professional musicians.

== History ==
In 1731, the need to train orderly musicians became a reality for the cavalry regiments with the creation of a military trumpet school at the Hôtel Royal des Invalides, which was then closed in 1788. In 1799, this school was recreated in Versailles under the name of the National School of Military Music. In 1762, in France, the first regular institution of military orchestras took place in the French Guards and Swiss Guards regiments of the Maison du Roi. In 1930, the school for sub-chiefs and conductors of military music was created. In 1965, it was renamed the training and development center for non-commissioned officer musicians of the Army. In 1978, it became the military music conservatory of the Army. Since 2016, it has been called the Army Music Command.

== See also ==
- Royal Corps of Army Music
- Australian Army Band Corps
