= Judge Nelson =

Judge Nelson may refer to:

- Adrienne Nelson (born 1967), judge of the United States District Court for the District of Oregon, previously justice of the Oregon Supreme Court
- David Aldrich Nelson (1932–2010), judge of the United States Court of Appeals for the Sixth Circuit
- David Sutherland Nelson (1933–1998), judge of the United States District Court for the District of Massachusetts
- Debra S. Nelson (fl. 1990s–2010s), Florida judge who presided over the trial of George Zimmerman
- Dorothy Wright Nelson (born 1928), judge of the United States Court of Appeals for the Ninth Circuit
- Edwin L. Nelson (1940–2003), judge of the United States District Court for the Northern District of Alabama
- Foggy Nelson, fictional Marvel Comics character who was a judge in the "Secret Wars" storyline
- Gary K. Nelson (1935–2013), judge of the Arizona Court of Appeals
- Rensselaer Nelson (1826–1904), judge of the United States District Court for the District of Minnesota
- Ryan D. Nelson (born 1973), judge of the United States Court of Appeals for the Ninth Circuit
- Susan Richard Nelson (born 1952), judge of the United States District Court for the District of Minnesota
- Thomas G. Nelson (1936–2011), judge of the United States Court of Appeals for the Ninth Circuit
- Thomas Leverett Nelson (1827–1897), judge of the United States District Court for the District of Massachusetts
- William Nelson (New York politician) (1784–1869), New York state court judge
- William Nelson (British judge) (born c. 1981), judge of the Magistrates' Courts of England and Wales

== See also ==
- Nelson (surname)
- Justice Nelson (disambiguation)
