= Heartbreak Ridge =

1986 American war film by Clint Eastwood

- Theatrical release poster
- Directed by: Clint Eastwood
- Written by: James Carabatsos
- Produced by: Clint Eastwood
- Starring: Clint Eastwood; Marsha Mason
- Cinematography: Jack N. Green
- Edited by: Joel Cox
- Music by: Lennie Niehaus
- Production company: Malpaso Productions
- Distributed by: Warner Bros.
- Release date: December 5, 1986
- Running time: 130 minutes
- Country: United States
- Languages: English; Spanish
- Budget: $15 million
- Box office: $121.7 million

Heartbreak Ridge is a 1986 American war film directed, produced by, and starring Clint Eastwood. The film co-stars Marsha Mason, Everett McGill, and Mario Van Peebles, and was released in the United States on December 5, 1986. The story centers on a U.S. Marine nearing retirement who gets a platoon of undisciplined Marines into shape and leads them during the American invasion of Grenada in 1983. The title comes from the Battle of Heartbreak Ridge in the Korean War, in which Eastwood's character had been awarded the Medal of Honor.

== Plot ==
In 1983, Marine Corps Gunnery Sergeant Thomas "Tom" Highway finagles a transfer back to his old unit, 2nd Reconnaissance Battalion, Second Marine Division. En route, "Stitch" Jones gets on the same bus as Highway. The following morning at a rest stop, Jones embezzles money from Highway along with his bus ticket, leaving Highway stranded.

When Highway arrives, his new commanding officer, Major Malcolm Powers assigns him to the Reconnaissance Platoon (part of his assault battalion) which by coincidence includes Jones. The platoon's previous sergeant, awaiting his retirement, had permitted their inactivity, but Highway enacts a rigorous training program. Despite initial resentment, the platoon's drilling pays off as they develop esprit de corps and respect for Highway, especially after learning he is a Medal of Honor recipient from the Korean War.

Powers and his assistant, First Platoon Staff Sergeant Webster, deplore Highway's unorthodox training methods (such as firing an AK-47 over his men's heads to familiarize them with the weapon's sound). Seeing Highway's platoon as simply a training tool for a supposedly elite First Platoon, Powers proceeds to arrange for First Platoon to beat Highway's men in every field exercise. However, Highway's old comrade-in-arms, Sergeant Major Choozhoo, and his nominal superior officer, First Lieutenant Ring, support him - when Highway "freelances" his men to win the field exercise, Lt. Ring gives false information and says that he ordered Highway to do it to protect Highway from a court-martial for disobeying orders, earning Highway's respect.

Highway attempts adapting his mindset to romance his ex-wife Aggie, a barmaid at a local tavern who is dating the establishment's Marine-hating owner, Roy. To achieve this, Highway resorts to reading women's magazines. Aggie tentatively reconciles with Highway.

The 22nd Marine Amphibious Unit is then deployed for the invasion of Grenada. After a briefing on the amphibious assault ship USS Iwo Jima (LPH-2), Highway's platoon mounts their UH-1 Huey and are dropped by helocast into the water before the rest of Powers' Battalion Landing Team. While advancing inland, they come under enemy fire. Highway orders Jones to provide cover using a bulldozer so they can advance and destroy an enemy machine gun nest. They rescue American students from a medical school, but their celebration is short-lived, as Choozhoo discovers that the Cubans are manning a key enemy position that will have to be taken to prevent further incidents. Powers, not wanting Highway to outdo him, orders the recon platoon to advance on the position, but not to attempt any engagement or take the position until First Platoon arrives.

Ring and Highway advance on the position, but come under fire from two armored cars and infantry. The platoon hides inside an abandoned building, but when the Cubans attack, platoon radioman Profile is killed and his radio destroyed, impeding direct communication. Ring proposes making a long-distance call to Camp Lejeune for air support and sends Jones to repair the phone line before borrowing a credit card to complete the call, but enemy fire severs the line as he completes calling in the coordinates for an air-strike. Unsure if the call went through, Highway goes to put out a marker for the air support to locate the position, but is fired upon and knocked unconscious. Assuming that Highway is dead, the platoon exits the building to engage the Cubans, but then the air support arrives and repels the enemy. Ring and a revived Highway then disregard Powers' order, take the position, and capture the Cuban soldiers.

Major Powers arrives with Webster, reprimands Ring and threatens Highway with a court-martial. However, the commanding officer of the regiment to which Powers' battalion belongs, Colonel Meyers (a veteran who served in the same battalion as Highway in the Vietnam War), arrives by helicopter and after learning of what has happened, commends Highway and punishes Powers with transfer back to his former support unit for discouraging the Recon Marines' fighting spirit.

Highway and his men are warmly received upon returning to the States, with the 1st Marine Division Band playing the official Marine Corps march. Jones informs Highway that he is going to re-enlist and make a career in the Corps, while Highway reveals that he is taking mandatory retirement. Aggie is waiting for him in the stands, and the two of them walk off together.

== Cast ==
- Clint Eastwood as Gunnery Sergeant Thomas "Tom" Highway
- Marsha Mason as Aggie Highway
- Everett McGill as Major Malcolm A. Powers
- Moses Gunn as Staff Sergeant Luke Webster
- Eileen Heckart as Mary Jackson
- Mark Mattingly as Franco "One Ball" Peterson
- Bo Svenson as Roy Jennings
- Boyd Gaines as First Lieutenant M.R. Ring
- Mario Van Peebles as Corporal "Stitch" Jones
- Arlen Dean Snyder as Sergeant Major J. Choozhoo
- Vincent Irizarry as Lance Corporal Fragetti
- Ramón Franco as Private Aponte (as Ramon Franco)
- Begona Plaza as Private Aponte's wife
- Tom Villard as Corporal "Profile"
- Mike Gomez as Corporal Quinones
- Rodney Hill as Corporal Collins
- Peter Koch as Private "Swede" Johanson
- Richard Venture as Colonel Meyers
- Peter Jason as Major G.F. Devin
- John Hostetter as Officer Reese
- Nicholas Worth as Jail Binger
- J. C. Quinn as the supply sergeant
- Rebecca Perle as Student in shower

== Production ==
Screenwriter James Carabatsos, a Vietnam War veteran of the 1st Cavalry Division, was inspired by an account of American paratroopers of the 82nd Airborne Division using a pay telephone and a credit card to call in fire support during the invasion of Grenada, and fashioned a script of a Korean War veteran career Army non-commissioned officer passing on his values to a new generation of soldiers. Eastwood was interested in the script and asked his producer, Fritz Manes, to contact the US Army with a view of filming the movie at Fort Bragg.

However, the Army read the script and refused to participate, due to Highway being portrayed as a hard drinker, divorced from his wife, and using unapproved motivational methods to his troops, an image the Army did not want. The Army called the character a "stereotype" of World War II and Korean War attitudes that did not exist in the modern army and also did not like the obscene dialogue and lack of reference to women in the army. Eastwood pleaded his case to an Army general, contending that while the point of the film was that Highway was a throwback to a previous generation, there were values in the World War II- and Korean War-era army that were worth emulating.

Eastwood approached the United States Marine Corps, which expressed some reservations about some parts of the film, but provided support. The character was then changed to a Marine. (This raised some conceptual difficulties, given that the Battle of Heartbreak Ridge primarily involved the Army. This is explained very briefly in the film when Sergeant Major Choozoo tells Stitch Jones that he and Highway were in the Army's 23rd Infantry Regiment at the time and "joined the Corps later"; the 23rd Regiment was at Heartbreak Ridge.) The Marine Corps first cooperated with the film project by allowing much of the filming to be done at Camp Pendleton. The Marines planned to use it to promote its "Toys for Tots" campaign, but upon viewing a first cut, quickly disowned the film because of the language.

Marines who viewed the film cited numerous issues with the way they were portrayed. Major Powers, the battalion's inexperienced S-3 Operations Officer, is repeatedly shown disparaging and insulting Gunny Highway, as well as showing blatant favoritism regarding "his" Marines of the First Platoon. In reality, this would not have happened, given Highway's Medal of Honor. Much of the "training" done before the Grenada invasion was highly inaccurate, including the fact that Highway's Marine Recon unit did not have a Navy corpsman to deal with his men if injured. Even on a relatively small budget, the technical advice was poor. The Defense Department originally supported the film, but withdrew its backing after seeing a preview in November 1986. Issues were drawn with the use of profanity, as well as the depiction of Eastwood's character shooting a wounded Cuban soldier in the back, which would constitute a war crime. The Marine Corps were also forbidden by the Department from promoting the film. The original screenplay depicted Highway's squad as being rerouted to Grenada after being sent to Lebanon to replace marines killed in the 1983 Beirut barracks bombings, but the Department wanted this plot point removed despite its historical accuracy. Eastwood initially refused before eventually relenting and accepting a script rewrite, but referred to the decision as "altering history" and stated that he was "sure relatives of people killed in Beirut wouldn’t like having that history denied." Eastwood was paid $6 million for directing and starring in the film.

Beginning in summer 1986, Heartbreak Ridge was filmed at Camp Talega (the location of the barracks), Chappo Flats (the location of the parachute rigging scene) and Mainside (the 1st Marine Division headquarters) on California's Camp Pendleton Marine Corps Base, the former campus of the San Diego Military Academy, SDMA Solana Beach and Puerto Rico's Vieques Island.

The sequence involving the bulldozer is based on a real event during the invasion of Grenada involving Army General John Abizaid, former commander of US Central Command. The American attack on Grenada is in some respects accurate, although it was really U.S. Army Rangers that secured the University Medical School. The scene in which Lieutenant Ring must resort to using a credit card in order to communicate with his commanders was also based on real-life events involving Army paratroopers.

The film was the 1,000th to be released in Dolby Stereo.

== Music ==
The film score was composed and conducted by American saxophonist Lennie Niehaus, who worked on over a dozen films for Eastwood. Actor Mario Van Peebles wrote the songs "Bionic Marine" and "Recon Rap", and co-wrote "I Love You (But I Ain't Stupid)" with Desmond Nakano.

== Reception ==
=== Critical response ===
Reaction to the film was generally mixed to positive. Among reviews, Roger Ebert of the Chicago Sun Times, gave the film three stars and noted how the film has "as much energy and color as any action picture this year, and it contains truly amazing dialogue." Ebert also complimented director Eastwood, saying how he "caresses the material as if he didn't know B movies have gone out of style." Paul Attanasio of The Washington Post agreed saying, "Those with an endless appetite for this sort of tough-man-tender-chicken melodrama will enjoy watching Clint go up against these young punks and outrun, outshoot, outdrink and outpunch them, in the process lending an idea of what it means to be a . . . Marine." Another Washington Post staff writer, Rita Kempley, offered a different view, commenting that it was "always fun to see misguided machismo properly channeled into service of God, country or the National Hockey League. Isn't that the trouble with combat movies these days? From Top Gun to First Blood to Clint Eastwood's entertaining action drama Heartbreak Ridge, the empty-foxhole syndrome makes for non-endings." The staff at Variety added to the encouraging reviews, saying that the film "offers another vintage Clint Eastwood performance. There are enough mumbled half-liners in this contemporary war pic to satisfy those die-hards eager to see just how he portrays the consummate marine veteran." Vincent Canby of The New York Times expressed his satisfaction with the film, writing that "Eastwood's performance is one of the richest he's ever given. It's funny, laid-back, seemingly effortless, the sort that separates actors who are run-of-the-mill from those who have earned the right to be identified as stars."

In terms of negative feedback, reviewer Derek Smith of the Apollo Movie Guide wrote that there was "not enough substance to Gunny to make him interesting enough to be the central character of a film, and since the movie offers nothing new or fresh, it just feels dull and uninteresting."

The film was positively received by marines, who praised it for its depiction of the Marine corps and its realism, while one sergeant-major marine who participated in the invasion of Grenada criticized the film's depiction of the event as completely inaccurate and offensive. Regarding the Department of Defense's decision not to promote the film, Eastwood stated that "With all these earth-shattering things going on back there (the Iran arms crisis), you wouldn’t think they would spend energy on something like this... It is not something of national security. In the words of Alfred Hitchcock, ‘It’s just a movie.’ " Eastwood also stated it was "a shame that a charity has to lose money because of somebody who’s got a bee under his rear end somewhere" in reference to the cancellation of the Marine-sponsored premiere of the film to benefit the Oceanside YMCA. In reference to criticism of the invasion's depiction, Eastwood cited practicality in not depicting the other participants such as the Army's actions, and cited realism as justifying the depiction of Highway killing a wounded Cuban soldier, which was also criticized by the Marine corps.

Heartbreak Ridge holds a 63% rating on Rotten Tomatoes based on 30 reviews with a mean of 6.5 of a possible 10. The site's consensus states: "With Heartbreak Ridge, director Clint Eastwood gets one of his best performances out of himself, even if the story struggles to engage." On Metacritic, the film holds a weighted score of 53 out of 100 based on 16 reviews, indicating "mixed or average" reviews. Audiences polled by CinemaScore gave the film an average grade of "B+" on an A+ to F scale.

Several writers have described the film as "imperialist propaganda" glorifying the American invasion of Grenada without explaining any of the history or politics surrounding it; the only information the audience is given about the war is that the Marines are rescuing American hostages and that there are Cubans on the enemy side. In Vietnam Images: War And Representation (1989), James Aulich and Jeffrey Walsh wrote that "Heartbreak Ridge dehistoricises actual political and economic conditions, omits many issues of imperialism or colonisation, and represents the Grenada events as a straightforward triumph of American manhood."

=== Accolades ===
The film won the BMI Film Music Award for Lennie Niehaus and the Image Award in the category of Outstanding Supporting Actor in a Motion Picture for Mario Van Peebles. The film also received a nomination, from the Academy Awards for Best Sound for Les Fresholtz, Dick Alexander, Vern Poore and Bill Nelson.

=== Box office ===
At its widest distribution in the United States, the film was screened at 1,647 theaters grossing $8,100,840 in its opening weekend. During that weekend, the film opened in second place behind Star Trek IV: The Voyage Home. Revenue dropped by 41% in its second week of release, earning $4,721,454. During its final weekend showing in theaters, the film grossed $1,040,729. It went on to take in a total of $42,724,017 in ticket sales during a seven-week theatrical run and a worldwide total of $121.7 million. It ranked 18th at the box office for 1986.

== See also ==
- List of American films of 1986

== Bibliography ==
- Hughes, Howard (2009). Aim for the Heart. London: I. B. Tauris. ISBN 978-1-84511-902-7.
- Munn, Michael (1992). Clint Eastwood: Hollywood's Loner. London: Robson Books. ISBN 0-86051-790-X.
