= 1st Marine Division (disambiguation) =

1st Marine Division is a division of the United States Marine Corps active since 1941.

1st Marine Division may also refer to the following military formations:

- 1st Marine Division (South Korea), active since 1955
- 1st Marine Division (Wehrmacht), February – May 1945

== See also ==
- 1st Marine Division Band, United States
- 1st Division (disambiguation)
