= Justice Nelson (disambiguation) =

Justice Nelson refers to Samuel Nelson (1792–1873), associate justice of the United States Supreme Court.

Justice Nelson may also refer to:

- Adrienne Nelson (born 1967), associate justice of the Oregon Supreme Court
- George B. Nelson (1876–1943), associate justice of the Wisconsin Supreme Court
- James C. Nelson (born 1944), associate justice of the Montana Supreme Court
- Madison Nelson (1803–1870), judge of the Maryland Court of Appeals
- Martin A. Nelson (1889–1979), associate justice of the Minnesota Supreme Court
- Thomas Amos Rogers Nelson (1812–1873), associate justice of the Tennessee Supreme Court
- Thomas Nelson (Oregon judge) (1819–1907), the 2nd chief justice of the Oregon Supreme Court

== See also ==
- Nelson (surname)
- Judge Nelson (disambiguation)
- Justice (disambiguation)
- Nelson (disambiguation)
