= Lethal Weapon =

1987 American film directed by Richard Donner

- Theatrical release poster
- Directed by: Richard Donner
- Written by: Shane Black
- Produced by: Richard Donner; Joel Silver
- Starring: Mel Gibson; Danny Glover; Gary Busey
- Cinematography: Stephen Goldblatt
- Edited by: Stuart Baird
- Music by: Michael Kamen; Eric Clapton
- Production company: Silver Pictures
- Distributed by: Warner Bros.
- Release date: March 6, 1987
- Running time: 109 minutes
- Country: United States
- Language: English
- Budget: $15 million
- Box office: $120.1 million

Lethal Weapon is a 1987 American action thriller film directed by Richard Donner and written by Shane Black. Starring Mel Gibson and Danny Glover, the film follows two mismatched LAPD detectives—Martin Riggs (Gibson), a volatile former Special Forces soldier struggling with suicidal impulses after his wife's death, and Roger Murtaugh (Glover), a seasoned homicide sergeant and devoted family man—who are partnered to investigate a young woman's apparent suicide during the Christmas season. The supporting cast includes Gary Busey, Tom Atkins, Darlene Love, and Mitchell Ryan.

Conceived by then-unknown screenwriter Shane Black as a contemporary urban Western exploring trauma, masculinity, and moral decay in Los Angeles, the film underwent extensive development under producer Joel Silver and was shaped by Donner's emphasis on character dynamics and gallows humor. Black's script, among the highest-selling speculative scripts of the 1980s, helped redefine the buddy cop genre.

Released theatrically in the United States on March 6, 1987, by Warner Bros., Lethal Weapon was both a critical and commercial success, grossing US$120.1 million worldwide against a $15 million budget and earning an Academy Award nomination for Best Sound. Its success established Gibson and Glover as major stars and solidified Donner's reputation for high-energy, character-driven, action filmmaking.

Lethal Weapon spawned a media franchise that includes three sequels, beginning with Lethal Weapon 2 (1989), and a television adaptation.

== Plot ==
Following the recent death of his wife, Los Angeles Police Department (LAPD) narcotics Sergeant Martin Riggs, a former Special Forces soldier and Vietnam War veteran, has become suicidal and erratic. Despite the protests of police therapist Stephanie Woods, Captain Ed Murphy believes that Riggs is faking his psychosis to be forcibly retired with a generous pension and partners him with fellow Vietnam War veteran and seasoned Homicide Sergeant Roger Murtaugh. Riggs and Murtaugh do not get along well, as Murtaugh is initially dismissive of Riggs's mental state, but he is soon convinced that Riggs is genuinely suicidal.

During the Christmas season, Murtaugh is contacted by his former Vietnam War comrade, Michael Hunsaker, ostensibly to rescue his daughter Amanda from a life of drugs and pornography. Before they can meet, though, Amanda jumps to her death from an apartment balcony. An autopsy later reveals that she was poisoned with tainted drugs, indicating that she would have died even if she had not jumped. Riggs and Murtaugh attempt to question Amanda's pimp, but are ambushed after finding cocaine on the premises, forcing Riggs to kill the pimp to save Murtaugh. Their final lead is Dixie, a prostitute who witnessed Amanda's death, and whom the pair believes has poisoned her. Dixie's home explodes as they arrive, and her corpse is later recovered. Riggs locates components of a mercury switch explosive among the debris, a specialty explosive he recalls being used by Central Intelligence Agency (CIA) mercenaries in the war. The bomber was witnessed by neighborhood children, who noticed that he had an elite Special Forces tattoo similar to Riggs'.

Suspecting that Hunsaker is withholding information, Riggs and Murtaugh visit him at Amanda's funeral. He reveals that during the Vietnam War, he worked for "Shadow Company", a defunct CIA paramilitary unit tasked with destabilizing the local heroin trade. Following the war, those involved reformed Shadow Company as a drug-smuggling operation under the leadership of retired General Peter McAllister and his right-hand man, Mr. Joshua. Hunsaker's role as a banker allowed him to make the illicit funds seem legitimate. Hunsaker initially called Murtaugh to confess and turn witness against Shadow Company, but McAllister had Amanda killed in retaliation. Joshua arrives in a helicopter and kills Hunsaker before escaping. He later shoots Riggs in a drive-by shooting, unaware that Riggs wore a bullet-proof vest. Riggs fakes his death in the aftermath to give the pair an advantage.

Concerned that Murtaugh knows too much, Shadow Company kidnaps his daughter Rianne and forces him to meet them at El Mirage Lake. Riggs provides sniper support to help them escape, but all three are captured and taken to a nightclub basement, a Shadow Company front, on Hollywood Boulevard. Riggs and Murtaugh are tortured for information until Riggs escapes, kills several Shadow Company members, and frees Murtaugh and Rianne. As the three escape, Murtaugh fires on McAllister as he flees in a car, which flips over, detonating the grenades inside; Joshua, however, escapes after a chase with Riggs on the freeway. Deducing that Joshua will seek revenge at Murtaugh's home, Riggs and Murtaugh ambush him. Riggs defeats him in a brawl, but chooses not to kill him. Police officers take Joshua into custody, but he breaks free, takes an officer's revolver, and attempts to shoot Riggs and Murtaugh; the pair returns fire, killing him.

A short time later, after visiting his wife's grave, Riggs shares Christmas Day dinner with Murtaugh and his family. He gives Murtaugh a hollow-point bullet he had been saving to commit suicide, as he no longer needs it.

== Cast ==
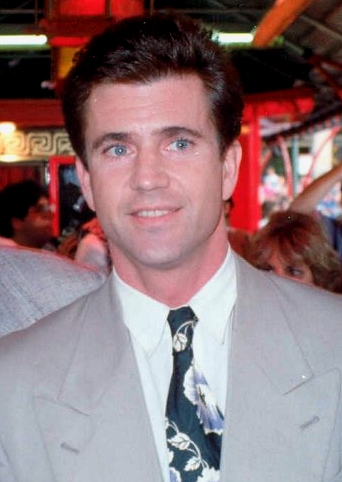
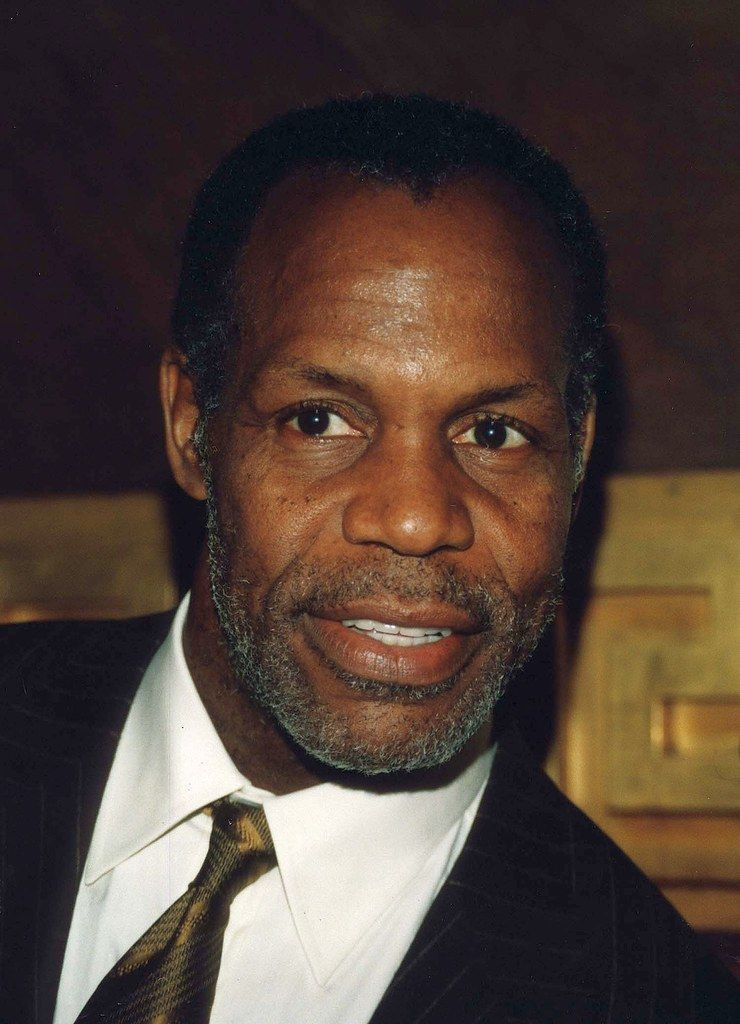
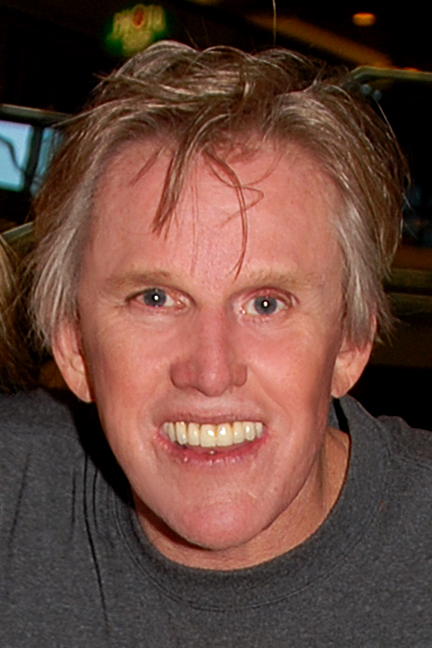
Mel Gibson (pictured in 1990), Danny Glover (1996), and Gary Busey (2007)
- Mel Gibson as Martin Riggs
- Danny Glover as Roger Murtaugh
- Gary Busey as Mr. Joshua
- Mitchell Ryan as General Peter McAllister
- Tom Atkins as Michael Hunsaker
- Darlene Love as Trish Murtaugh
- Traci Wolfe as Rianne Murtaugh

In addition, the film introduces various minor characters—and the actors who portray them—seen in all four films of the franchise, including: Murtaugh children Nick and Carrie, played by Damon Hines and Ebonie Smith, respectively; Steve Kahan as Captain Ed Murphy; and Mary Ellen Trainor as police psychologist Stephanie Woods.

Other actors in the film include Jackie Swanson as Amanda Hunsacker, Grand L. Bush as Detective Boyette, Jack Thibeau as Detective McCaskey, Don Gordon as Officer Hines, Ed O'Ross as Mendez, Al Leong as Joshua's assistant Endo, Lycia Naff as Dixie, and Sven-Ole Thorsen and Gilles Kohler as Shadow Company mercenaries. Jimmie F. Skaggs, Jason Ronard, and Blackie Dammett play the trio of drug dealers whom Riggs apprehends.

== Production ==
=== Development ===
Recent UCLA graduate Shane Black wrote the screenplay in mid-1985. Black stated that his intention was to do an "urban Western", inspired by Dirty Harry, where a violent character "reviled for what he did, what he is capable of, the things he believed in" is eventually recruited for being the one who could solve the problem. The protagonists would be everymen policemen, "guys shuffling in a town like Los Angeles searching for something noble as justice when they're just guys in washed and worn suits seeking a paycheck".

According to Black, his original first draft of the script was very different from and much darker than the final film. It was 140 pages long and both the plot and characters were different, and the action scenes were also much bigger. The ending of the script contained a chase scene with helicopters and a trailer truck full of cocaine exploding over Hollywood Hills with cocaine snowing over the Hollywood sign. Black hated this first draft and initially discarded it, but later picked it up again and rewrote it into the new drafts that were eventually used for filming.

His agent sent the Lethal Weapon script to various studios, being rejected before Warner Bros. Pictures executive Mark Canton took a liking to it. Canton brought along producer Joel Silver, who loved the story and worked with Black to further develop the script. Writer Jeffrey Boam also did some uncredited rewrites on Black's script after complaints that parts of it were too dark. Boam added more humor to the script, and later did a complete rewrite of Black and Murphy's rejected script for the second film. He also wrote the script for the third film and an unused draft for the fourth film.

After the script was purchased for $250,000, studio production executives offered it to director Richard Donner, who also loved it. Leonard Nimoy was among the directors considered for the project, but he did not feel comfortable doing action films, and he was working on Three Men and a Baby at the time.

=== Casting ===
Donner, having just finished filming Ladyhawke, had long been interested in working with Mel Gibson. Casting director Marion Dougherty first suggested teaming Gibson with Danny Glover, given Murtaugh had no set ethnicity in the script. She arranged for Gibson to fly in from his home in Sydney, while Glover was flown in from Chicago, where he was appearing in a play, to read through the script. Bruce Willis was approached for the role of Riggs, but turned it down, as he found the script "too violent". This is referenced in the spoof of the Lethal Weapon films, Loaded Weapon 1; Bruce (as John McClane) appears after the villains attack the wrong beach residence, looking for the protagonist. Christopher Lambert and Christopher Reeve were both approached, but neither was interested. Michael Biehn was also a brief contender to play Riggs, as Donner had enjoyed his performance in The Terminator, but he was already committed to Aliens. Other actors who were considered for the role included Pierce Brosnan, Stephen Lang, Ron Perlman, Michael Nouri, Sylvester Stallone, Patrick Swayze, Michael Douglas, Jeff Goldblum, and Kurt Russell.

According to Donner: "It took about two hours and by the time we were done, I was in seventh heaven. They found innuendoes; they found laughter where I never saw it; they found tears where they didn't exist before; and most importantly, they found a relationship—all in just one reading. So, if you ask about casting... it was magical, just total dynamite".

Gibson said, "this particular story was a cut above others I had passed on, because the action is really a sideline which heightens the story of these two great characters. I picture Riggs as an almost Chaplinesque figure, a guy who doesn't expect anything from life and even toys with the idea of taking his own. He's not like these stalwarts who come down from Mt. Olympus and wreak havoc and go away. He's somebody who doesn't look like he's set to go off until he actually does".

The draw for Glover was equally strong. Fresh from his success as Mister in The Color Purple, he felt the role of Roger Murtaugh offered a whole new range of character expression and experience: "Aside from the chance to work with Mel, which turned out to be pure pleasure, one of the reasons I jumped at this project was the family aspect. The chance to play intricate relationships and subtle humor that exist in every close family group was an intriguing challenge, as was playing a guy turning 50. Murtaugh's a little cranky about his age until everything he loves is threatened. His reawakening parallels Riggs'".

Both actors were signed by early spring 1986. Gibson and Glover then flew home to pack, and returning to Los Angeles, began an intensive two months of physical training and preparation. Meanwhile, the crucial role of Mr. Joshua was settled when Gary Busey asked to read for the part. An established star since his Academy Award-nominated performance in The Buddy Holly Story, Busey had not auditioned for a film in years, but was suffering from a career slump; he credited Lethal Weapon with reviving his stardom. In Busey's comment: "I had butterflies, I'd never played a bad guy. And no one had seen me since I'd lost 60 pounds and got back into shape. But I decided to take the initiative in order to have the opportunity to work with Dick, Joel, Mel, and Danny. I'm constantly looking for someone to pull the best performance out of me and any of those guys could. They even talked me into dyeing my hair!" In his E! True Hollywood Story biography, Busey says he was hired to play Joshua because the producers were looking for someone big and menacing enough to be a believable foe for the imposing Gibson.

=== Pre-production ===
Stunt coordinator Bobby Bass planned and supervised all phases of Gibson and Glover's intense pre-production training, physical conditioning, weight workouts, and weapons handling and safety. Bass also used his own military experiences to bring a greater depth of understanding to the Riggs character. To familiarize the actors with the specialized skills and sensibilities acquired by undercover cops, arrangements were made for Gibson and Glover to spend time in the field accompanying working LAPD officers. Throughout filming, technical advisers from the LAPD, as well as the LA County Sheriff's Department worked closely with Donner and the actors to ensure authenticity.

Cedric Adams was the first technical adviser brought in. Donner said, "Adams thought the best possible way to show just how lethal Riggs really is—is to show his mastery of a form of martial arts never before seen onscreen". Donner wanted Riggs's style of fighting to be unique with the second assistant director Willie Simmons, who was interested in unusual forms of martial arts, choosing three martial arts styles. Gibson and Busey were instructed in Capoeira by Adams, Jailhouse rock by Dennis Newsome and Brazilian Jiu-Jitsu by Rorion Gracie. Bobby Bass, the stunt coordinator, a former US Army Special Forces instructor and judo champion, also provided training in various techniques. At one point, the actors trained in between filming, for four hours a day for six weeks and did months of choreography.

=== Filming ===
An alternate opening and ending were both filmed and can be seen on the Lethal Weapon 4 DVD. The alternate opening featured Martin Riggs drinking alone in a bar, where he is accosted by a couple of thugs who attack him for his money, but are easily subdued by Riggs. Director Richard Donner felt the film should open with a brighter look at Riggs, and replaced the bar scene with the scene in which Riggs awakens in his trailer. The alternate ending featured Riggs telling Murtaugh not to retire. Without even thinking about the possibility of sequels, Donner decided that Riggs and Murtaugh's relationship is one of friendship, and filmed the ending that appears in the completed film.

In addition to the film's theatrical release, an extended Director's Cut version was released later on DVD. The Director's Cut version is longer (117 minutes) than the original theatrical release version (110 minutes) and features additional scenes. One extended scene depicts Riggs dispatching a sniper who had been firing at children in a playground. In another scene, Riggs picks up a street-walking prostitute, but instead of having sex with her, he takes her home to watch The Three Stooges on TV, thus illustrating his loneliness following the death of his wife.

=== Music ===
Michael Kamen, who had just completed work on Highlander, composed the score for Lethal Weapon. Editor Stuart Baird had used Edge of Darkness heavily as a temp score for the film, resulting in Kamen being brought on to create the score. The guitar part of Riggs's theme was performed by Eric Clapton. Kamen and Clapton had worked together on the music for the 1985 BBC television series Edge of Darkness (the feature adaptation of which would later, by coincidence, star Mel Gibson). The saxophone part of Murtaugh's theme was performed by David Sanborn. The Christmas song "Jingle Bell Rock", performed by Bobby Helms, is played during the film's opening credits. Honeymoon Suite's song, "Lethal Weapon", is played during the film's end credits without being credited.

== Release ==
=== Box office ===
Lethal Weapon was released in the United States and Canada on March 6, 1987. During its opening weekend, it grossed a total of $6.8 million from 1,256 theaters—an average of $5,437 per theater—making it the highest-grossing film of the weekend, ahead of A Nightmare on Elm Street 3: Dream Warriors ($6.7 million) in its second week of release, and Platoon ($6.1 million) in its 12th week. In its second weekend, Lethal Weapon retained the number-one position with a $7.1 million gross—a 4% increase from the previous week—still ahead of A Nightmare on Elm Street 3: Dream Warriors ($5 million) and Platoon ($4.7 million).

Lethal Weapon remained the number-one film in its third weekend with a $6.3 million gross, ahead of the debuting Burglar ($4.5 million) and Platoon ($3.8 million). Lethal Weapon fell to number two in its fourth weekend with a gross of $5 million, behind the debut of Blind Date ($7.5 million). Lethal Weapon spent 13 weeks among the top-10 highest-grossing films. In total, Lethal Weapon grossed $65.2 million in the United States and Canada, making it the eighth-highest-grossing film of 1987.

Outside of the United States and Canada, Lethal Weapon is estimated to have earned a further $55 million. It had some of its most success in Gibson's home country of Australia. This figure gives Lethal Weapon a total worldwide gross of $120.2 million.

=== Home media ===
Lethal Weapon has been released on Betamax, VHS, and DVD numerous times, along with a single Blu-ray Disc release. The first DVD was released in 1997 and featured the film's theatrical version. The Director's Cut was released in 2000 and was seven minutes plus longer. Since then, numerous sets have been released that contain all four films in the series (featuring the same DVDs). The theatrical version was also released on Blu-ray in 2006. Lethal Weapon was released on 4K Ultra HD Blu-ray on June 24, 2025, containing both the theatrical and director's cuts, although this release omits the legacy bonus features, including the commentary track and the Honeymoon Suite music video for the title track.

== Reception ==
=== Critical reception ===
On Rotten Tomatoes, Lethal Weapon has an approval rating of 81% based on 59 reviews. The site's critical consensus reads: "The most successful installment in a phenomenally successful franchise, Lethal Weapon helped redefine action movies for the 1980s and 1990s." Metacritic, which uses a weighted average, assigned the film a score of 68 out of 100, based on 23 critics, indicating "generally favorable" reviews.

Variety wrote, "Lethal Weapon is a film teetering on the brink of absurdity when it gets serious, but thanks to its unrelenting energy and insistent drive, it never quite falls." Richard Schickel of Time called it "Mad Max meets the Cosby Show", saying that it works better than expected. Richard Harrington of The Washington Post described it as "a vivid, visceral reminder of just how exciting an action film can be". At The New York Times, Janet Maslin wrote, "The film is all fast action, noisy stunts and huge, often unflattering close-ups, but it packs an undeniable wallop." Roger Ebert of the Chicago Sun-Times gave the film four out of four stars, saying Donner "tops himself".

=== Accolades ===
The film was nominated for the Academy Award for Best Sound Mixing (Les Fresholtz, Dick Alexander, Vern Poore, and Bill Nelson), losing to The Last Emperor.

== Reboot ==
In 2011, Warner Bros. Pictures announced it would reboot the Lethal Weapon franchise without Gibson and Glover. The new franchise was set to feature the same characters, but a brand-new cast. Will Beall was hired to write the script, but it was eventually cancelled. A television version premiered in September 2016 on Fox starring Clayne Crawford as Martin Riggs, Damon Wayans as Roger Murtaugh, and Thomas Lennon as Leo Getz.
