= Parachute Band (military band) =

Military band of the French Army

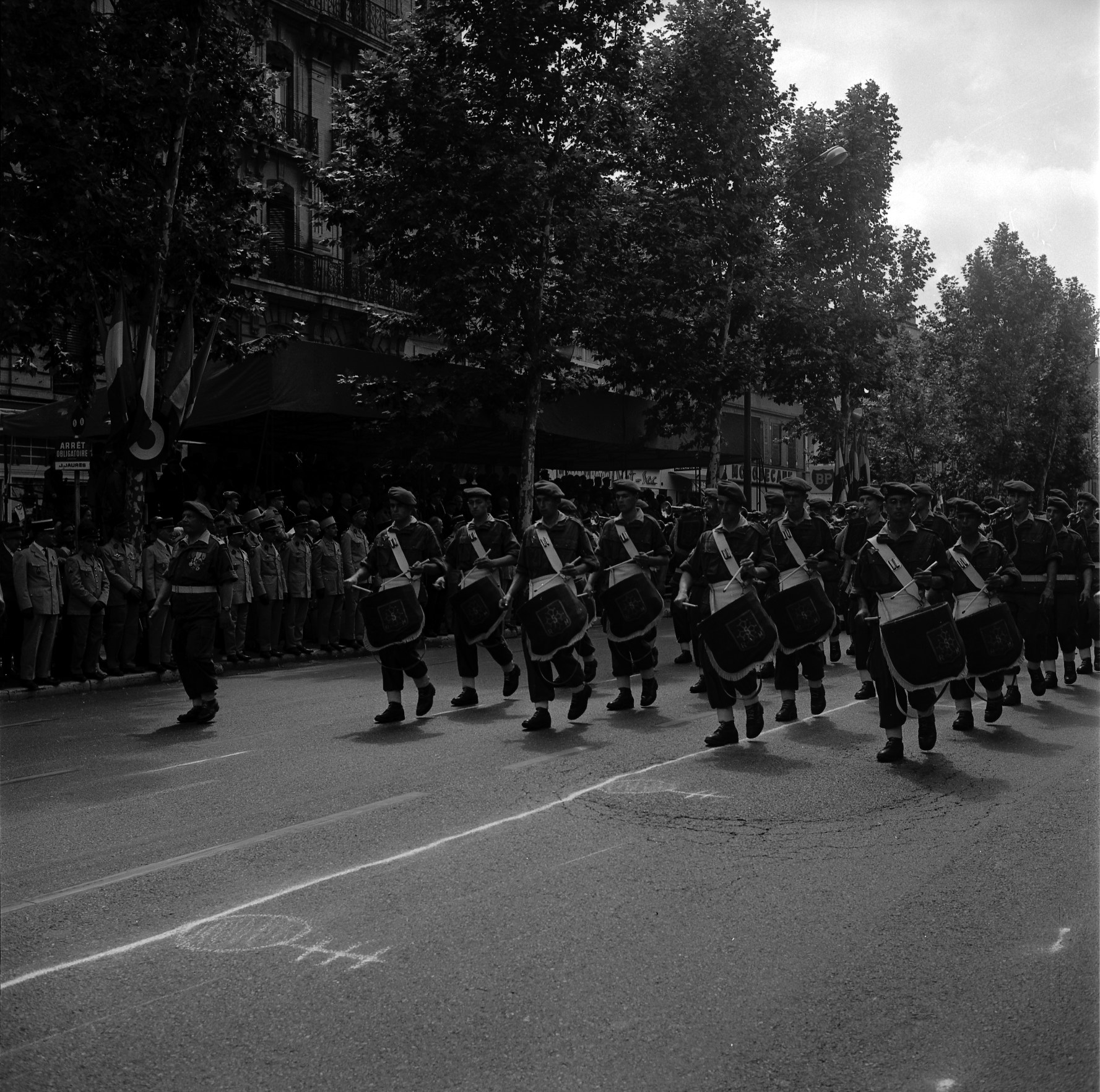
The band on Bastille Day in 1965.

The Parachute Band (French: Musique des Parachutistes) is a Toulouse-based military band of the French Army. It is stationed in the Balma District of Toulouse. Composed of 55 musicians, in consists of all professional musicians under a chief music director (currently Philippe Ballada). Its field of action represents 20 departments across the Aquitaine, Midi-Pyrénées, Limousin and Poitou-Charentes regions. It is administratively attached to the 11th Parachute Brigade.

== History ==
The band's origins date back to 1888, and has for more than a century, had various names and numerous restructurings. In the 1920s, it was housed in the Niel barracks with a considerable staff of more than 120 musicians. In 1945, it became the musical name of the 5th Demi Brigade. In 1946, following further modifications, this musical formation became the Band of the 14th Infantry Battalion before being dissolved in 1949 following the reorganization of the musical formations. In 1955, with the creation of regional music, Toulouse had its own band, called Band of the 5th Military Region.

From 1 September 1991, the military music of Toulouse took the nomination of divisional band of the in Bordeaux. As of 1 August 1996, a new reorganization of the musical formations of the army, it became the band of another army unit with a staff of 55 musicians. In 1999, after an army reorganization, the band appeared among six professional military musical formations of the Army and took the role of the Band of the South-West Army Region, subsequently being placed under the authority of the commanding officer of the RTSO. Since 1 January 2011, the band has taken the name of the Parachute Band. Since 1 August 2016, it has been under the immediate command of the Army Music Command.

== See also ==
- 191st Army Band
