= French Army Signals Band =

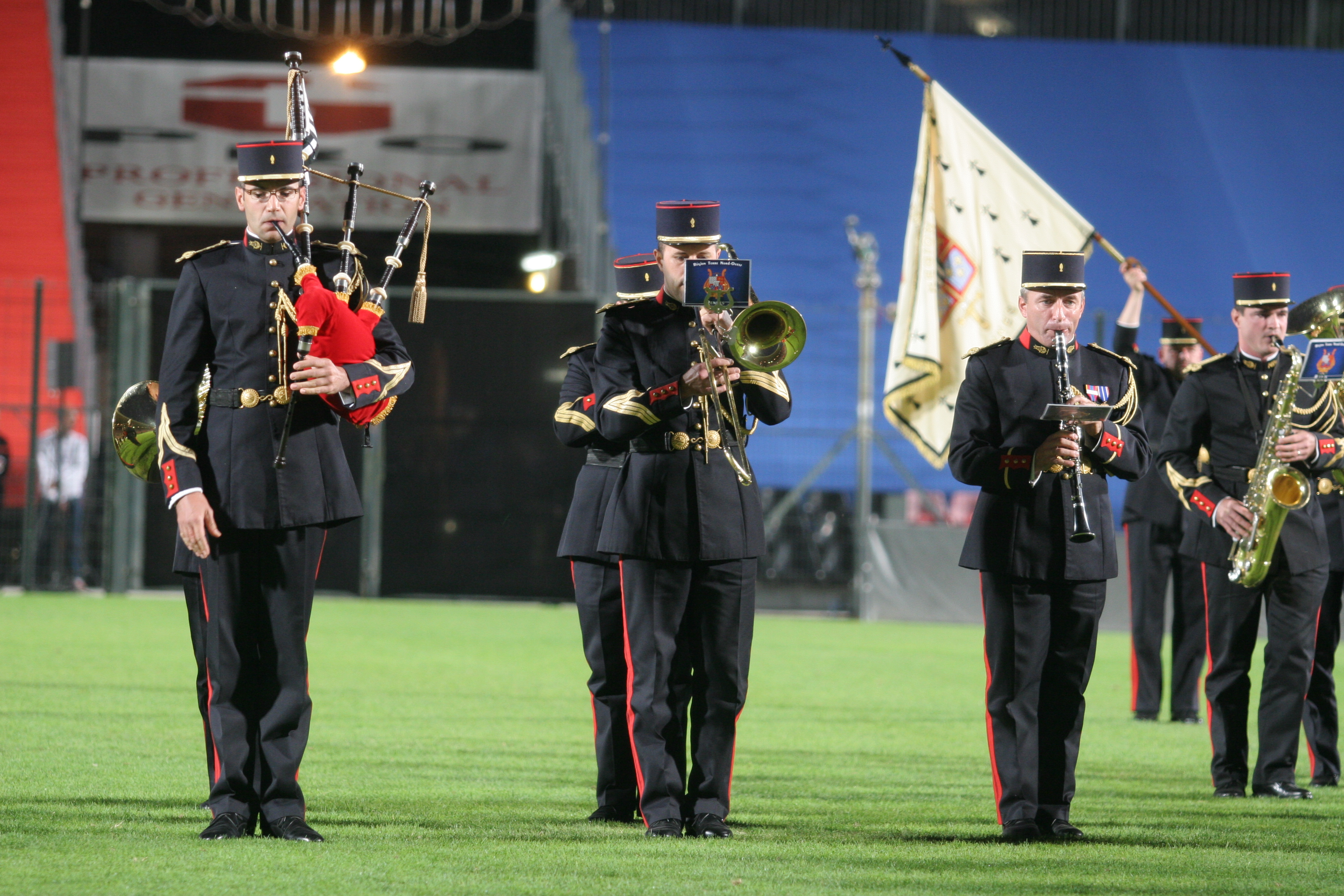
The band in Nice during an October 2007 military Tattoo.

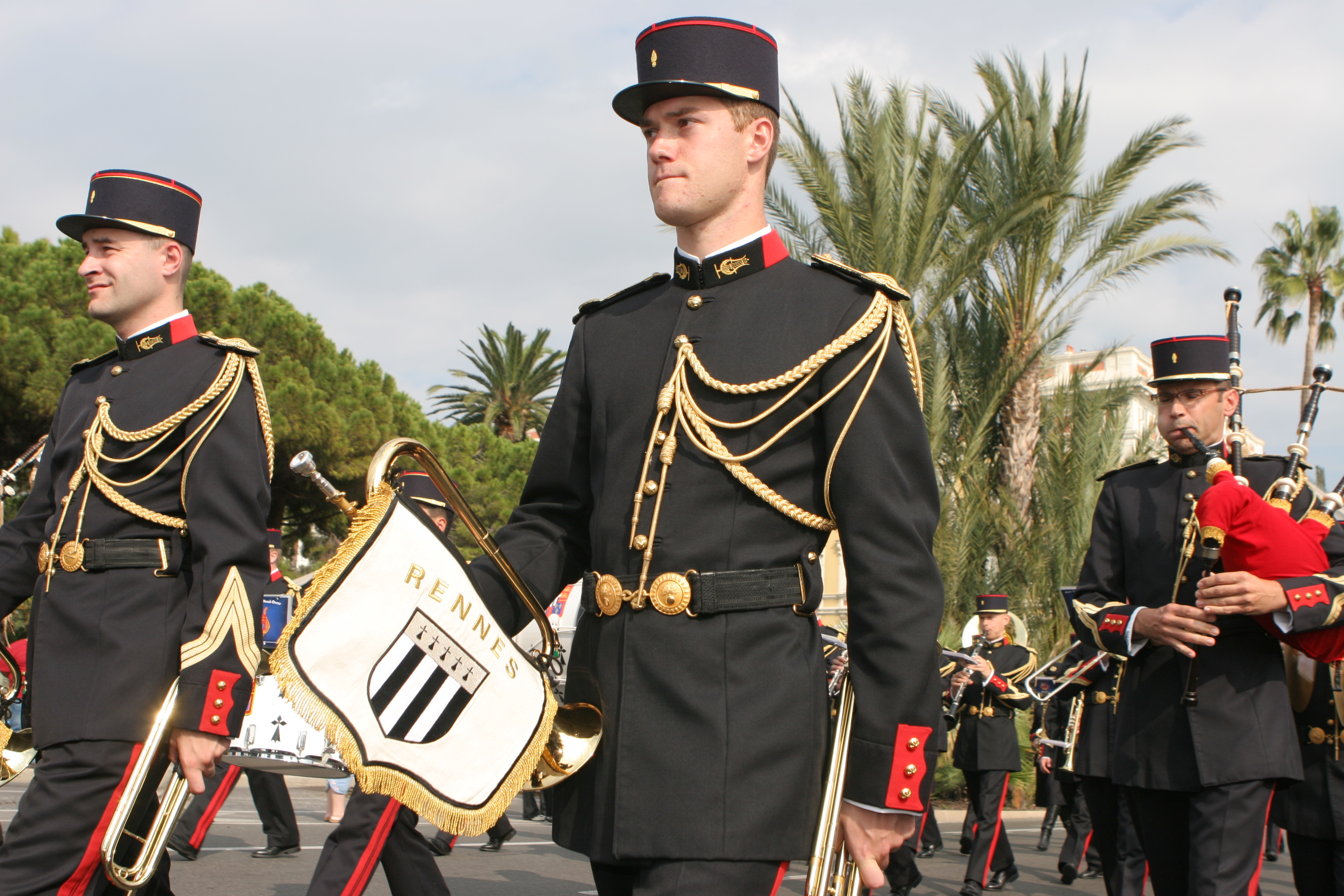
A member of the band during a festival.

The French Army Signals Band (French: Musique des Transmissions de l'armée française; M-TRANS) is a French Army military band based in Rennes. Comprising 53 musicians, it is one of the seven bands of the army (excluding the bands of the regiments and military schools). It is led by Captain Sandra Ansanay-Alex, who has served in this capacity since 2013. She is the first female conductor in the history of the French Army.

The band employs the Brittany region's Celtic heritage, with 2 bagpipes and a bombard player in its ranks. It has participated in international events such as the Sevastopol Military Tattoo, the Spasskaya Tower Military Music Festival and Tattoo and the Virginia International Tattoo. €67,340.96 was the sum of money that was collected during the concerts the band provided in 2019.

Originally known as the Band of the 41st Infantry Regiment. It later became part of the North-West Army Region and in 2010 and was renamed to the Artillery Band. During its time as the Artillery Band, it was part of the 16th Artillery Group. With the army reforms that became effective on 1 September 2016, it was renamed to the Signals Band.

== See also ==
- 191st Army Band
- Royal Artillery Band
- Royal Canadian Artillery Band
- French Republican Guard Band
