= Musique des Troupes de Marine =

French military band

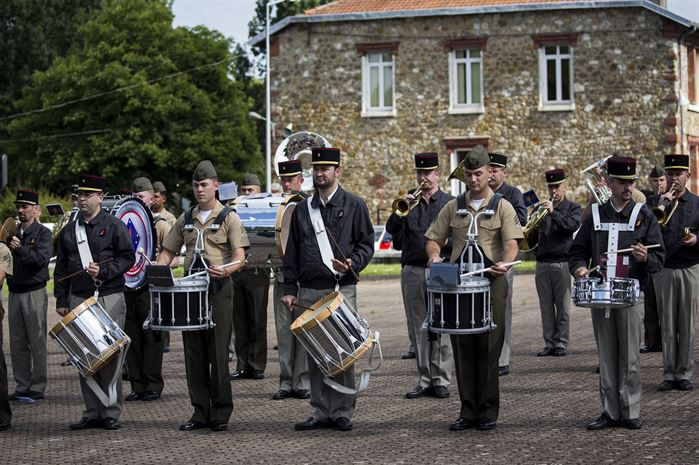
Members of the band with the 1st Marine Division Band in 2015

The Musique des Troupes de Marine (M-TDM) (lit. 'Music of the Navy Troops') is a military band in the French Army, attached to the army's naval infantry branch; the Troupes de marine. It contributes to the prestige of many official ceremonies and gives honor to high ranking French personalities. It frequently represents the French Republic abroad in military tattoos and military parades in countries such as the United States, Canada, South Korea, Israel, India, Bulgaria, and Russia. Since 1991, the band has been located at the Camp de Satory in Versailles, Yvelines. Operationally, it is assigned to the Army Music Command.

== History ==
The band was created in Rochefort, Charente-Maritime in 1945 by Jean Avignon, under the name of the Colonial Brass Band. A year later, it came under the control of the 3rd Battalion of Colonial Infantry and moved to Limoges Barracks. That same year, its first official performance took place on Bastille Day. At the end of 1947, the brass band increased in personnel and moved to Clignancourt Barracks, which was the headquarters of the staff of the 1st Colonial Half Brigade. In 1952, the band was put under the jurisdiction of the Marines.

By 1958, the band, which at this time renamed to the Principal Music Band of the French Army (French: Musique principale de l'armée de terre), had become an important component of Army life and culture, becoming the de facto seniormost band in the service branch. As the army's main harmonic band, it performed at all types of grand ceremonies, such as the Bastille Day Military Parade and Victory in Europe Day celebrations. In 1978, Minister of Defence Yvon Bourges ordered that the band be enlarged so it could be the largest of the five musical formations in the army. In 1997, it was officially designated as the army's senior band. In 2016, as part of special reforms within the Army Music Command, the band was put back under the Marine chain of command.

== Composition ==
The band is composed of 99 professional musicians and NCOs who are recruited into the following ensembles of the band by competition or audition:

- Ceremonial Band – Performs during military parades, state visits, state dinners, and other solemn events where the band can perform stationary and non-stationary drill.
- Wind Orchestra – Deals with a broad repertoire covering all classical and modern literature. The ensemble pays particular attention to so-called light music, thus promoting the balance between the popular tradition of the concert and the modernism of a repertoire that is often unpublished.
- Special Groups – the wind quintet, brass quintet or saxophone quartet offer a more different approach to performances in more restricted and enclosed settings by differentiating the style and instrumentation of the group. The string quartet performs at prestigious events like receptions in embassies or ministries, often performing more classical music than the other ensembles, although it does indeed have a broad repertoire.

== See also ==
- French Foreign Legion Music Band (MLE)
- French Republican Guard Band
- United States Marine Band
- Rotterdam Marine Band of the Royal Netherlands Navy
- Brazilian Marine Pipes, Drum and Bugle Corps
