= Bill Nelson (artist) =

American artist and sculptor

Bill Nelson (born September 30, 1946) is an American artist and sculptor. His artwork has been exhibited at numerous galleries including the Norman Rockwell Museum, and has appeared on the covers of major publications such as The New Yorker, Newsweek, New York Times Book Review, TV Guide, and The Atlantic Monthly, as well as genre magazines such as Famous Monsters of Filmland and Cinefantastique. His designs were featured in the 1996 "Big Band" series of postage stamps issued by the U.S. Post Office. His awards include two gold medals from the New York Art Director's Club and two silver medals from the Society of Illustrators.

In addition to his illustration work, he is also a sculptor of ventriloquists' figures, including one requested by a client to "look like God."

== Publications ==
- The Man of a Thousand Faces: The Art of Bill Nelson (2011)
