= Musique de l'Arme Blindée Cavalerie =

French military band

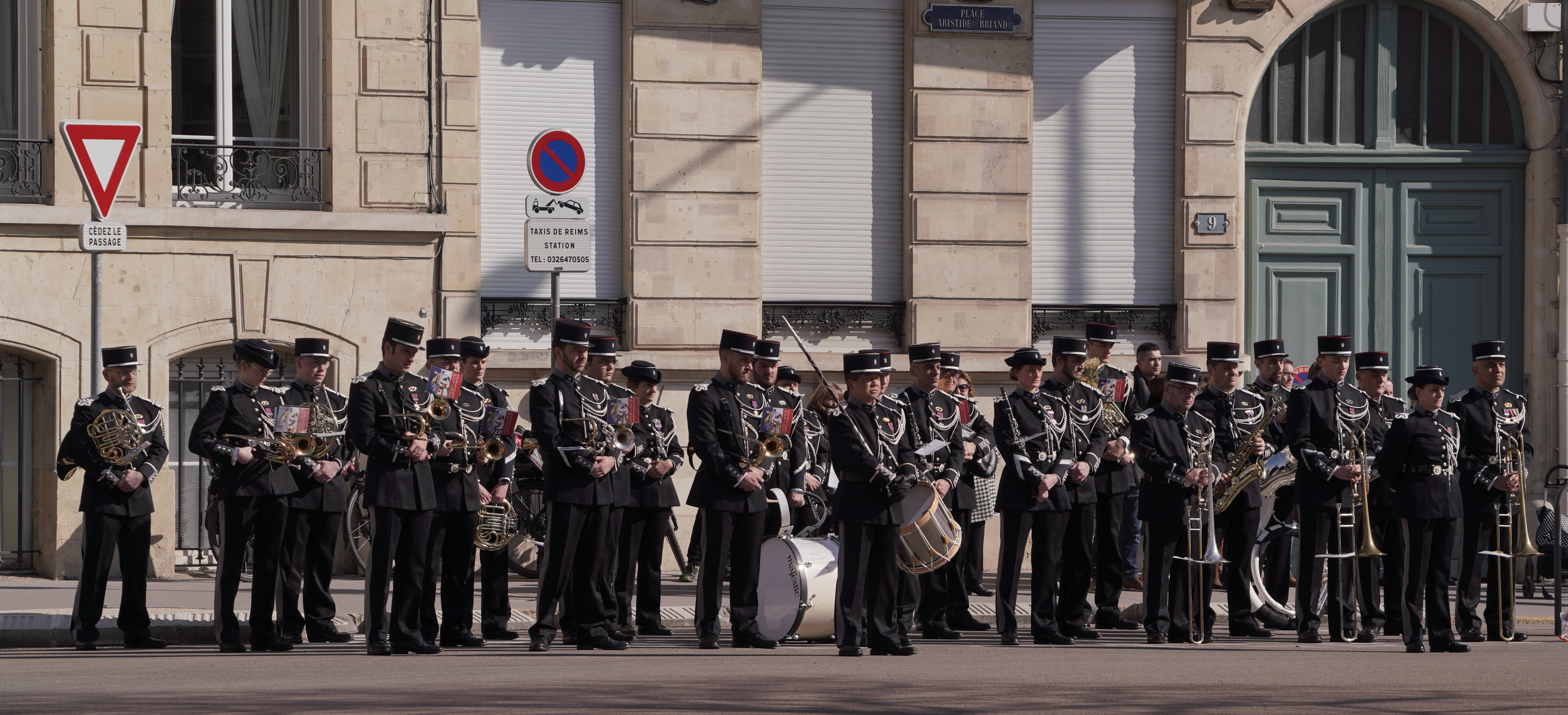
The band at Rheims, 8 March 2024.

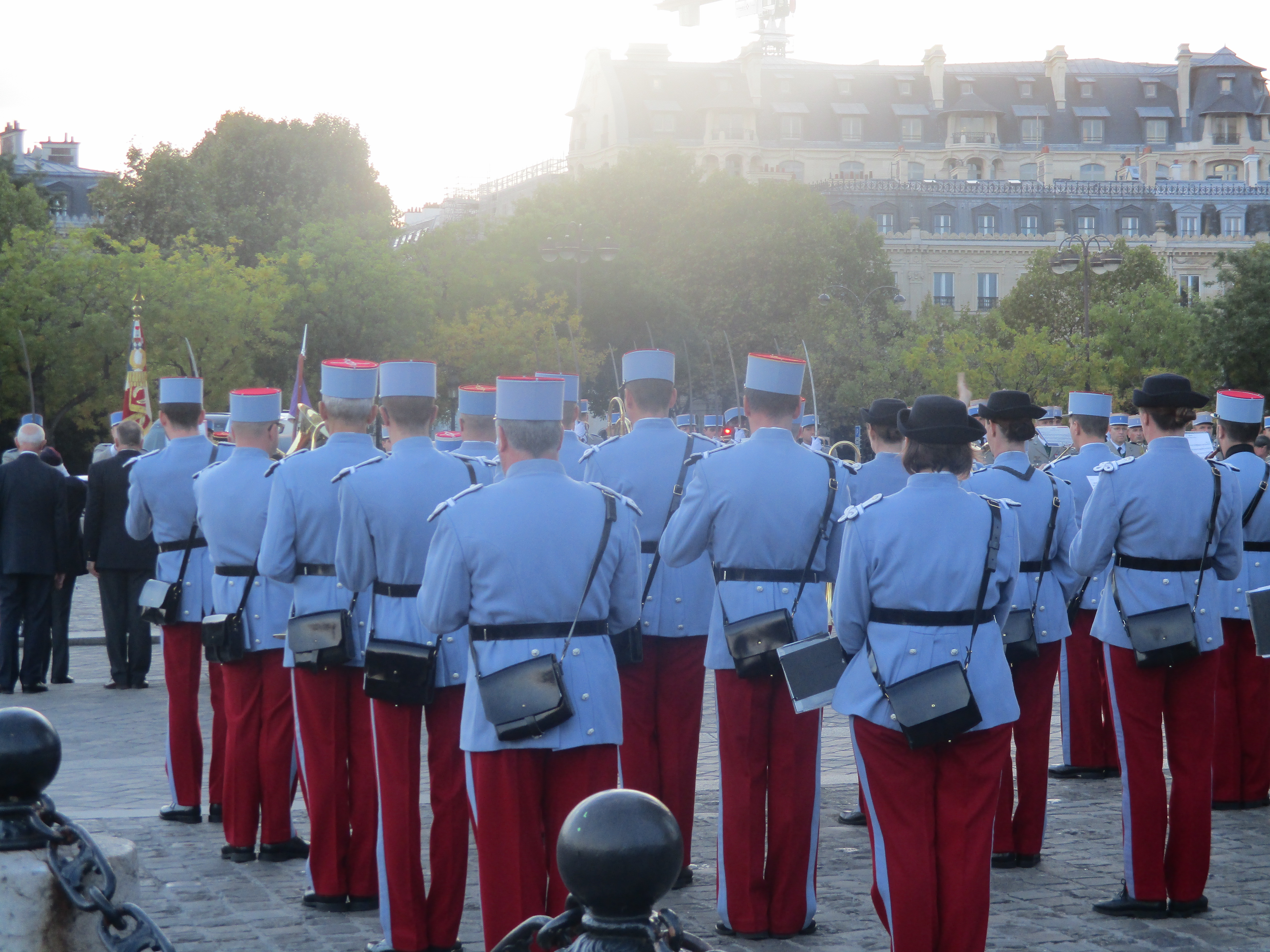
The band at the Arc de Triomphe in Paris, 16 October 2016.

The Musique de l'Arme Blindée Cavalerie (M-ABC) (English: Cavalry and Armored Branch Band) is a military band of the French Army's Armored Branch. It is stationed in Montigny-lès-Metz. It is under the immediate command of the Army Music Command, of which it is one of six bands. It is under the operational command of the 4th Hussar Regiment. It has taken part in events such as the Saumur International Festival of Military Bands and the Spasskaya Tower Military Music Festival and Tattoo. In the latter performance in Moscow, it performed with the Fanfare de l'Ecole d'Application de l'Artillerie and singer Mireille Mathieu. It has also performed in other countries like China, Turkey, and Hungary. It has 40 musicians that consist of a large wind band and various small ensembles (wind quintets, brass, saxophone quartets, clarinets).

== History ==
It was established in its modern form on 1 January 2011 and has roots that date back to 1888. Prior to 2011, it was known as the Musique Région Terre Nord-Est, which it was known by from 2001. It dates back to 1888 and a band within the 151st Infantry Regiment. Dissolved in 1940, it was reconstituted in 1944 in Metz and joined in 1946 the regiment in Germany. It was based from 1947–1948 with its regiment in Sétif in Algeria and joined the metropolis and the garrison of Metz in 1948. It was in 1979 when it became Principal Band of the 6th Military Region and as such she entered the category of the largest musical groups in the army. In 1996, it took the name of the Band of the Military Defense District.

== See also ==
- 1st Cavalry Division Band
- The King's Own Calgary Regiment Band
- Band of the Royal Armoured Corps
