= William Neilson =

William Neilson may refer to:

- William Neilson (Lord Provost), Lord Provost of Edinburgh 1717 to 1719
- William Neilson (businessman) (1844–1915), Canadian businessman
- William Neilson (Manitoba politician) (1854–1903), physician and politician in Manitoba, Canada
- Willie Neilson (1873–1960), Scottish rugby player
- William Allan Neilson (1869–1946), Scottish-American educator
- William Neilson (cricketer) (1848–1880), English-born New Zealand cricketer
- William George Neilson (1862–1899), Canadian politician in the Legislative Assembly of British Columbia
- Bill Neilson (1925–1989), Premier of Tasmania

== See also ==
- William Nelson (disambiguation)
