= Infantry Band =

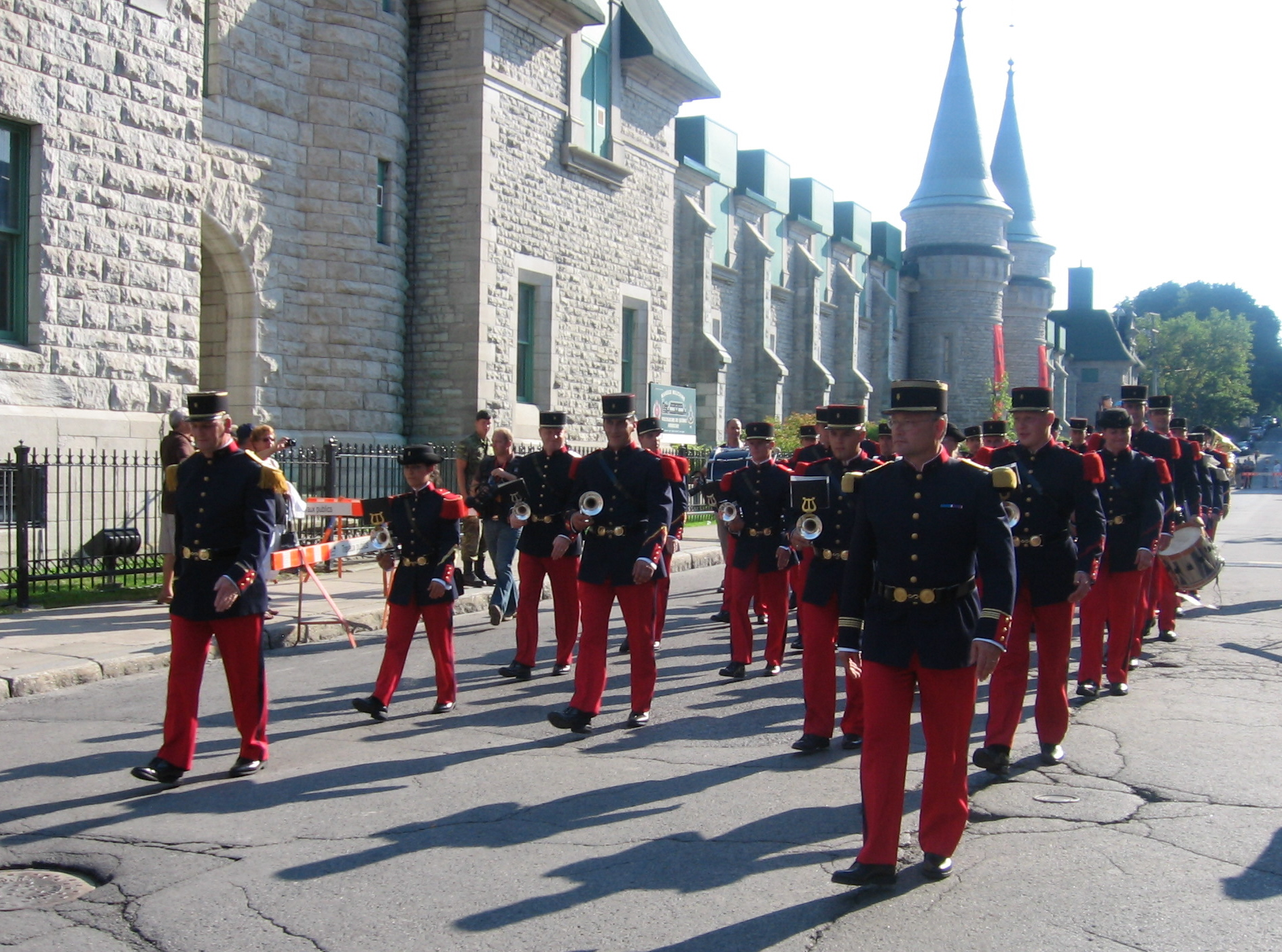
The band (then known as the Land Forces Band) during a parade in Quebec in 2012.

The Infantry Band (French: Musique de l'Infanterie, M-INF) is a military band of France based out of Lille. It is one of the six musical units of the Army Music Command. It is also operationally attached to the 43rd Infantry Regiment. It is currently led by Chef de Musique Martial Drapeau. Since 1 September 2016, it has been based in Lille as the first professional military brass band. It was originally established in 1638 as the Royal des Vaisseaux or Royal Vessel. It used to be known officially as the Band of the 43rd Infantry Regiment and the Musique des Forces Terrestres (Band of the Land Forces). Today it conducts ceremonies such as formal concerts and anniversary parades. In recent years, it has participated events such as the Quebec City Military Tattoo, the Memorial Day ceremonies at the Somme American Cemetery, and the Birmingham Tattoo. It has also visited countries such as Morocco, Georgia, Mexico.

== See also ==
- Band of the Grenadier Guards
- Governor General's Foot Guards Band
- Armed Forces of Malta Band
