= William Nelson (British judge) =

William Nelson (born c. 1981) is a District Judge (Magistrates' court) appointed by Queen Elizabeth II on the advice of the Lord Chancellor, the Right Honourable Dominic Raab MP and the Lord Chief Justice of England and Wales, the Right Honourable The Lord Burnett of Maldon. The Lord Chief Justice has deployed him to the South Eastern Circuit, based at Thames Magistrates' Court with effect from 1 November 2021.

Judge Nelson was admitted to the Roll of Solicitors in 2007. He was appointed as a Fee-paid Judge of the First-tier Tribunal, assigned to the Social Entitlement Chamber in 2019 and as a Deputy District Judge in 2019.
