= Bill Nelson (baseball) =

American baseball player (1863–1941)

- Pitcher
- Born: September 28, 1863; Terre Haute, Indiana, U.S.
- Died: June 23, 1941 (aged 77); Terre Haute, Indiana, U.S.
- Batted: Unknown Threw: Right

MLB debut
- September 3, 1884, for the Pittsburgh Alleghenys

Last MLB appearance
- September 10, 1884, for the Pittsburgh Alleghenys

MLB statistics
- Win–loss record: 1–2
- Earned run average: 4.50
- Strikeouts: 6
- Stats at Baseball Reference

Teams
- Pittsburgh Alleghenys (1884)

William F. Nelson (September 28, 1863 – June 23, 1941) was an American starting pitcher in Major League Baseball who played for the Pittsburgh Alleghenys of the American Association. Nelson threw right-handed; his batting side is unknown. He was born in Terre Haute, Indiana.

Little is known about Nelson, who was 20 years old when he entered the majors on September 3, 1884. He posted a 4.50 ERA in three complete games and did not have a decision, giving up 13 earned runs on 26 hits and eight walks while striking out six in 26 innings of work. As a hitter, he went 2-for-12 (.167) with a run scored. He played his final game on September 10, and never appeared in a major league game again.

Nelson died in his native Terre Haute at age 77.

== See also ==
- 1884 Pittsburgh Alleghenys season
