= 191st Army Band =

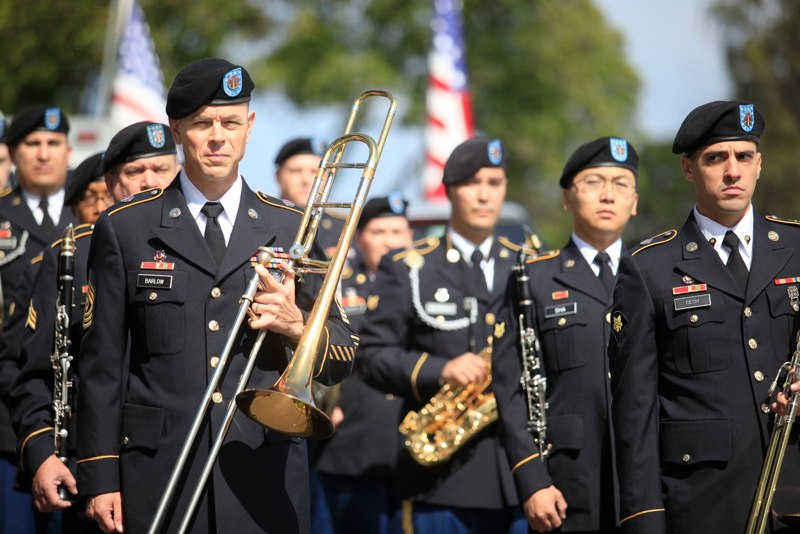
- Active: 1943 – Present
- Country: United States
- Branch: United States Army
- Type: military band
- Role: public duties
- Size: 45
- Part of: 63rd Regional Support Command
- Garrison/HQ: Camp Parks
- Nickname: Band of the Wild West
- Engagements: Rome-Arno campaign (1944); North Apennines campaign (1945); Po Valley campaign (1945)
- Decorations: Army Superior Unit Award
- Website: http://www.bandofthewildwest.com/

Commanders
- Current commander: CW2 Daniel Cech

Insignia
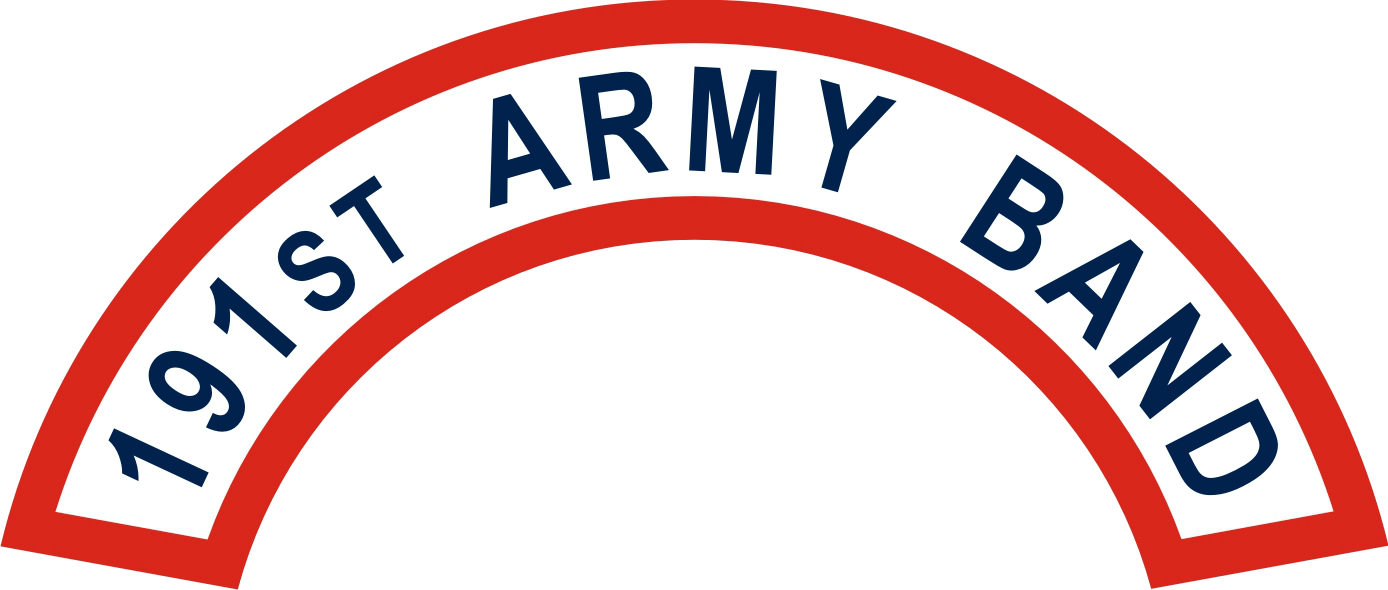
- Tab

The 191st Army Band, popularly known as the Band of the Wild West, is a military band of the U.S. Army Reserve posted at Camp Parks, California. Activated in 1943 as the 91st Infantry Division Band, the unit deployed to Europe in World War II where it fought in the Spring 1945 offensive in Italy. It received its current designation as the 191st Army Band in 2008. The 191st Army Band is a subordinate unit of the U.S. Army's 63rd Regional Support Command.

== History ==
=== Background ===
The 191st Army Band was activated on August 2, 1943, and was originally known as the 91st Infantry Division Band. The unit was the amalgamation of the 361st Infantry Regiment Band and 91st Infantry Division's Artillery Band, created as a result of the Army's earlier decision to abolish regimental bands in favor of division-level bands. The following year it deployed with the rest of the division to Italy where it participated in the Rome-Arno, North Apennines, and Po Valley campaigns. Over the next 80 years it would be periodically deactivated, activated, and redesignated.

In 1962, the pipe band of the U.S. Army's 5th Infantry Division was deactivated and its bagpipers transferred to the 91st Division Band. Today, the band remains one of the few U.S. military bands with attached bagpipes.

In 2003 the band was mobilized for regular Army service for ten months, making it the only Army Reserve band to be mobilized in support of Operation Enduring Freedom. It received the Army Superior Unit Award for its performance during this mobilization. On October 16, 2008, the 91st Division Band changed designation to the 191st Army Band and was placed under the 63rd Readiness Division at Camp Parks. At the same time, it was granted its motto: "Band of the Wild West".

The 191st Army Band leads a pass-in-review in 2009.

=== Traditions ===
==== Baldric ====
The drum major's baldric (often also called a sash) is styled in dark blue. The unit's tab is displayed below a doubled white scroll inscribed "191st" "ARMY BAND" in red letters and below three scrolls inscribed "THE BAND" "OF THE" "WILD WEST" in dark blue letters. The red, yellow, and black band represents the Army Superior Unit Award earned by the unit. The three white bands display the campaign credit for WWII service: Rome-Arno, North Apennines, and Po Valley.

==== Mace ====
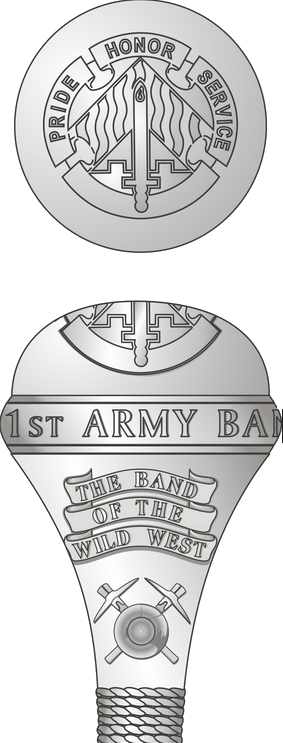
Illustration of the dome of the 191st Army Band's drum-major's mace.

The drum major's mace shows, on the dome, the distinctive unit insignia of the 63rd Readiness Division. Displayed around the mace is the inscription "191st ARMY BAND". On the lower portion and on both sides of the mace are three scrolls bearing the inscription "THE BAND" "OF THE" "WILD WEST"; below is the image of crossed miner's picks and pan, used by the miner's during the California Gold Rush, alluding to the unit's home station of California. A stylized rope encircles the bottom of the mace six times, suggesting a lariat, a symbol of the Wild West.

==== Special unit designation ====
The 191st Army Band uses the special unit designation "Band of the Wild West" originally authorized it when designated the 91st Division Band.

==== Tabard ====
The background of the trumpeter's tabard is adapted from the California flag; displayed is the distinctive unit insignia worn by the unit between a red scroll inscribed "191st ARMY BAND" in white at top and below the insignia are two stacked dark blue scrolls inscribed " THE BAND OF THE WILD WEST " in white.

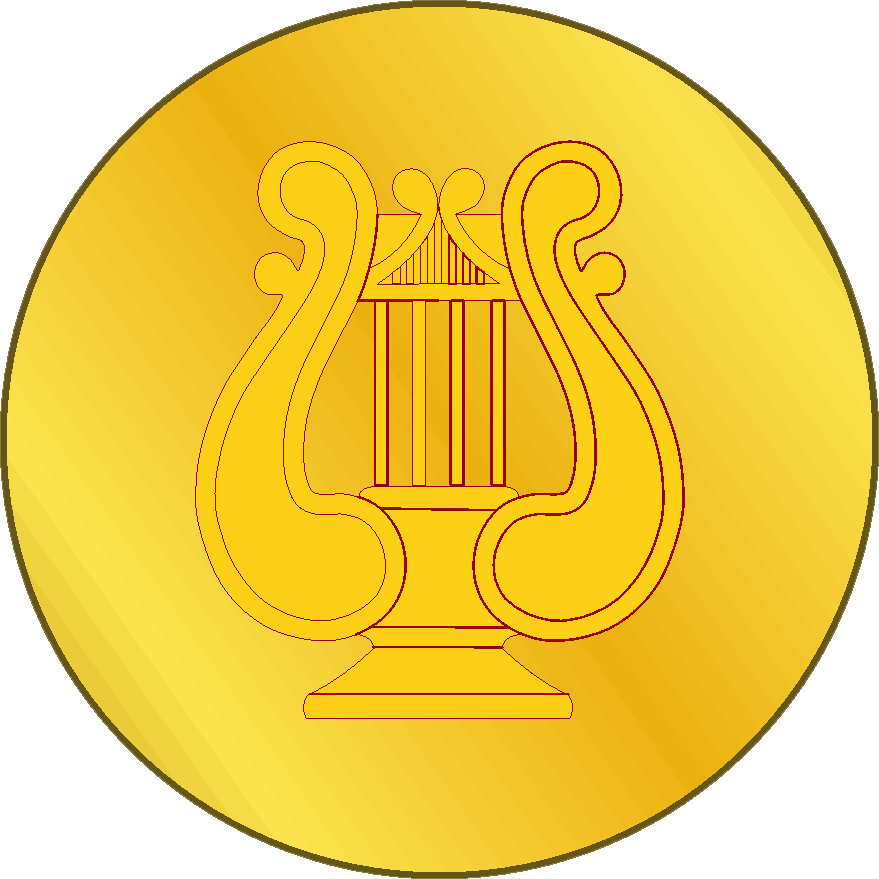
Army Band collar device

== Mission ==
As one of three reserve bands under the control the 63rd Readiness Division (formerly the 63rd Regional Support Command), the 191st Army Band provides ceremonial musical support to 40,000 Army Reserve soldiers in a region encompassing the states of California, Nevada, Arizona, New Mexico, Texas, Oklahoma, and Arkansas. The 191st Army Band's two sister bands are the 300th Army Band in Bell, California and the 395th Army Band in Mustang, Oklahoma. In addition to supporting Soldiers in those states, the 191st provides public performances in northern California, normally including Memorial Day, Independence Day, and Veterans Day parades and other events.

World War I- and World War II-era doctrine held that U.S. Army bands (other than premier ensembles) were reconfigurable as a light infantry platoon and, during combat operations, would reinforce military police "by performing command post security, all-source production section security, and perimeter security for the ... EPW central collecting point and EPW holding area". However, over time, U.S. Army senior leadership has realized the unique skillset represented in its Soldier-Musicians, and this has resulted in a rewrite of its formal mission statement as follows: "[Army Bands] Promote the Army and our national interests, enable commanders to shape the environment to accomplish their mission, and set the conditions that lead to trust and confidence in America's Army and its readiness to conduct operations in peacetime, conflict, and war."

== See also ==
- U.S. Army Band
- U.S. military bands
