= Bill Nelson (sports coach) =

William “Bill” Nelson is a former Australian Olympic swimming coach, vice president of the World Swimming Coaches Association and Coach of The Year. He is also a consultant to the National Rugby League & NRL teams, National Basketball league teams, AFL and Rugby Union, Australian Road Cycling team, and Australian Olympic Basketball team.

During his career Bill coached Daniel Kowalski, Matthew Dunn, Scott Miller, Michael Klim, Nicole Stevenson, Linley Frame and Duncan Armstrong. He was the national event coach for distance swimming for the Australian swimming team, a program that contained swimmers such as Ian Thorpe, Kieren Perkins and Grant Hackett. He was part of the Australian coaching team for several international events, including the 1992 and 1996 Olympic Games.
