= 1st Marine Division Band =

USMC military unit band

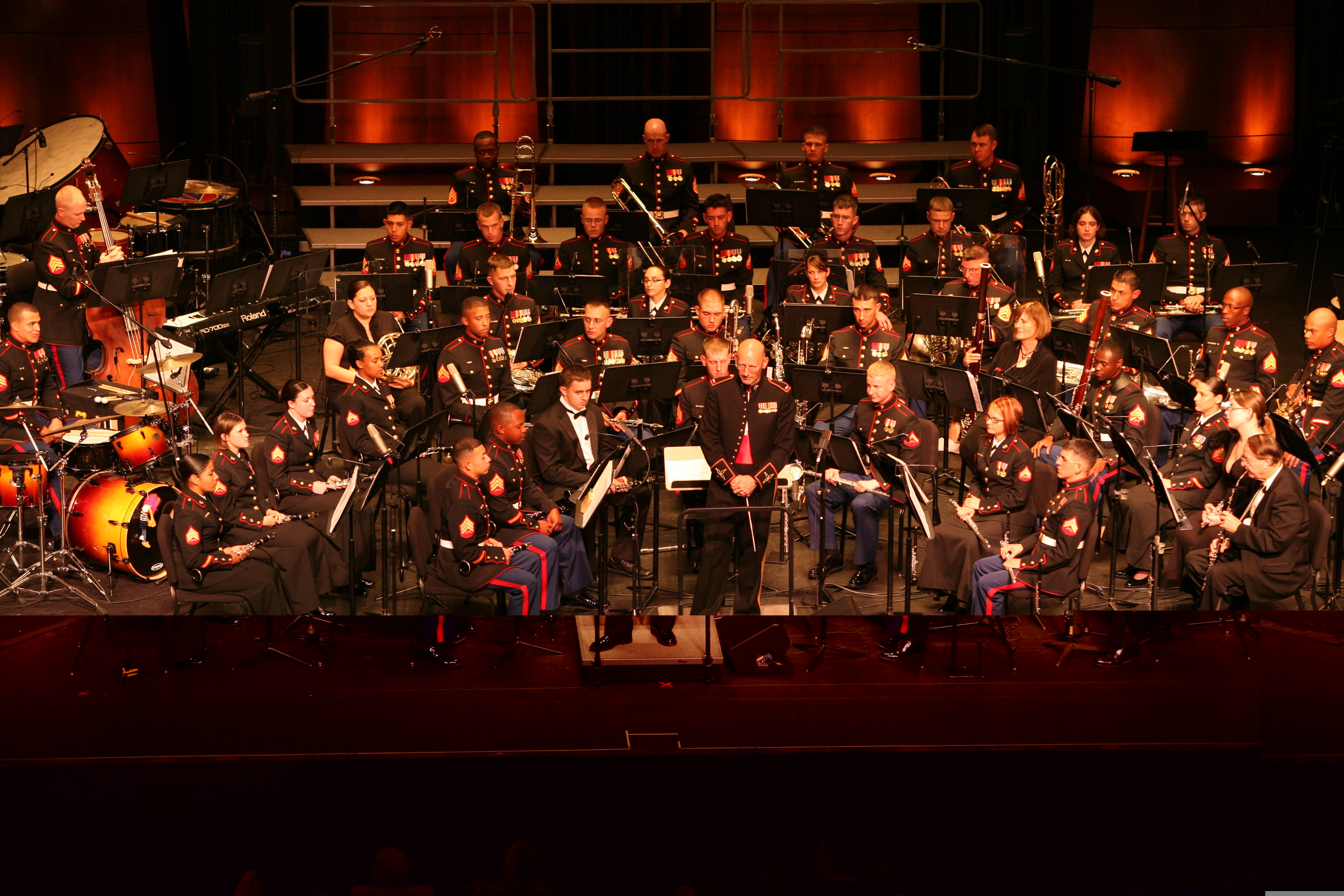
- The 1st Marine Division Band performing at the Escondido Arts Center.
- Active: 1940 – present
- Branch: United States Marine Corps
- Type: military band
- Role: Public duties
- Size: 50 members
- Part of: 1st Marine Division
- Garrison/HQ: Camp Pendleton, California
- Nicknames: 1st MARDIV Band, Task Force Bravo
- March: Marine Hymn (official hymn); Semper Fidelis (official march); Waltzing Matilda (divisional march)
- Website: https://www.music.marines.mil/Bands/1st-Marine-Division-Band-California/

Commanders
- Band Officer / OIC: Captain Eric Kyne
- Band Officer / OpsO: Warrant Officer Sean Salazar
- Enlisted Bandleader / SNCOIC: Master Gunnery Sergeant Devon T. Van
- Notable commanders: Chief Warrant Officer CWO4 Mike Edmonson; CWO4 Stephanie Wire; CWO3 Edward Hayes

The 1st Marine Division Band is a regional military band of the United States Marine Corps, reporting directly to the 1st Marine Division. It is stationed in Camp Pendleton, California. The band serves as the de facto USMC representative for the Western United States, performing at over 300 military and state functions, civic events, and military parades a year.

== History ==
The 1st Marine Division Band was organized during World War II when the division was based in Australia to participate in the Pacific War. On the occasion of President George Washington's birthday in February 1943, the 1st MARDIV Band played Waltzing Matilda, an Australian bush ballad which would later be the official march of the division. The band would play this march again in April of that year during an ANZAC Day parade in Melbourne and would continue to play it exclusively during the division's deployment to Australia. In recent years, all 50 members of the band have taken up arms to serve on the battlefield, especially during the Gulf War, the Iraq War and the Iraq conflict (2003–present). During the lattermost conflict, the band was attached to Headquarters Company, 5th Marine Regiment at Camp Fallujah, Iraq from February 2006–January 2007. During this deployment, the band served as a security platoon. In 2008, the band was awarded the "Colonel George S. Howard Citation of Musical Excellence for Military Concert Bands" by the John Philip Sousa Foundation. In 2006, the band took part in the State funeral of President Gerald Ford and has annually taken part in the Rose Parade as part of the USMC West Coast Composite Band.

== Ensembles ==
The following ensembles are subordinated to the 1st MARDIV Band:

- Ceremonial Band
- Wind Ensemble
- Brass Band
- Brass Quintet
- Jazz Combo
- Popular Music Group

== Gallery ==
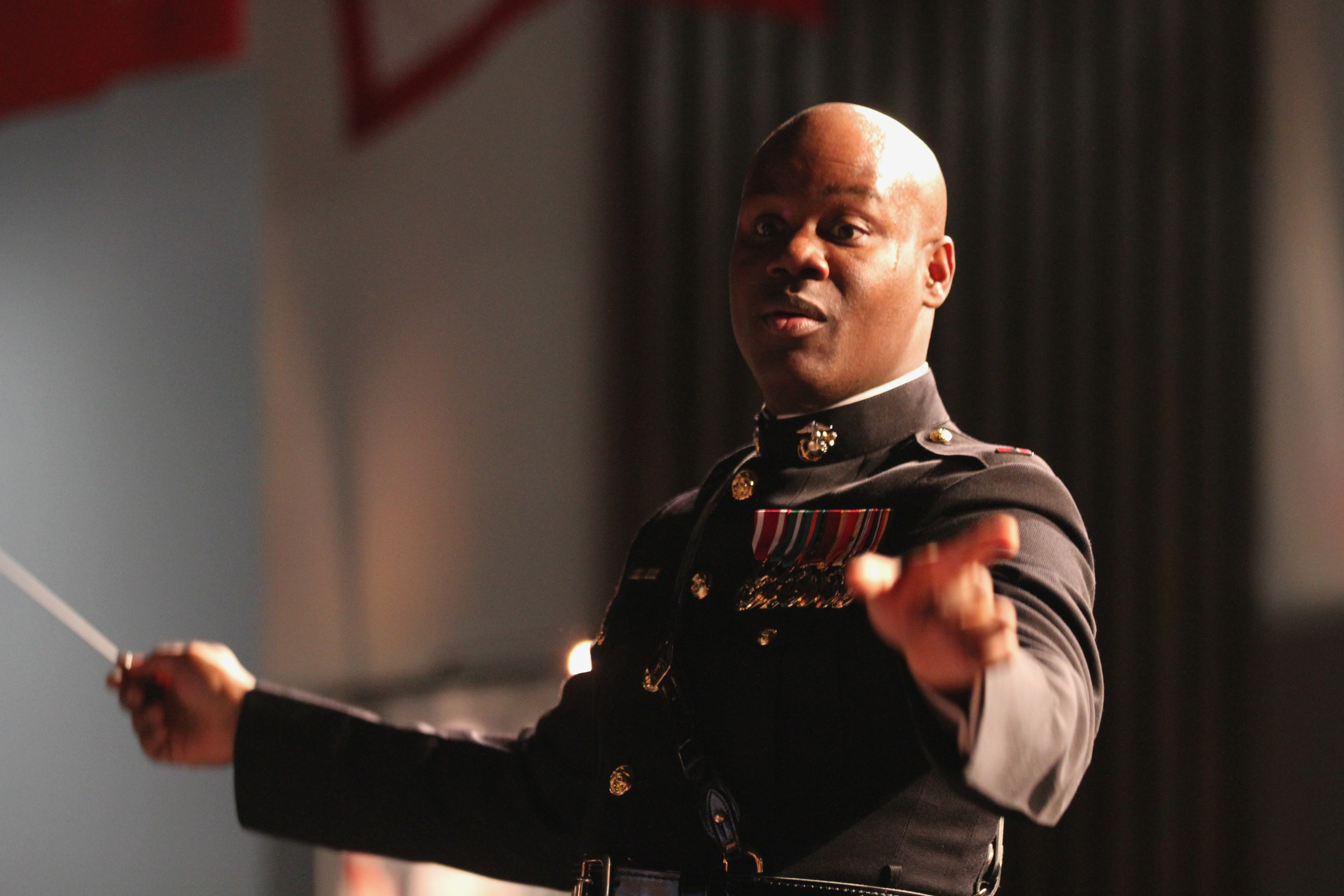
CWO3 Edward Hayes, director of the 1st Marine Division Band, conducting during a concert at the California Maritime Academy in Vallejo.

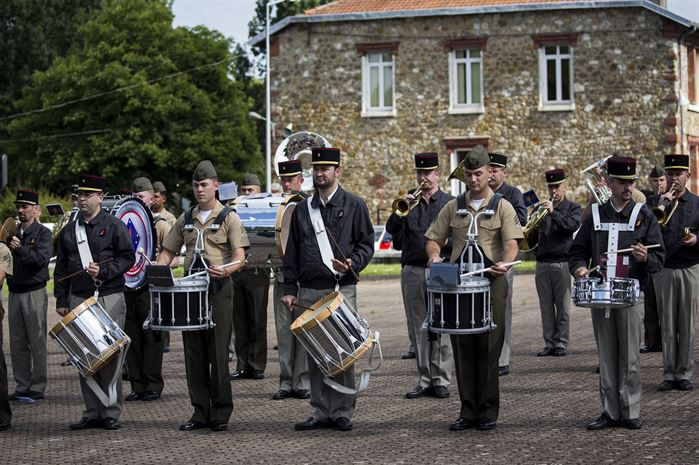
Members of the band with the Musique des Troupes de Marine in 2015.

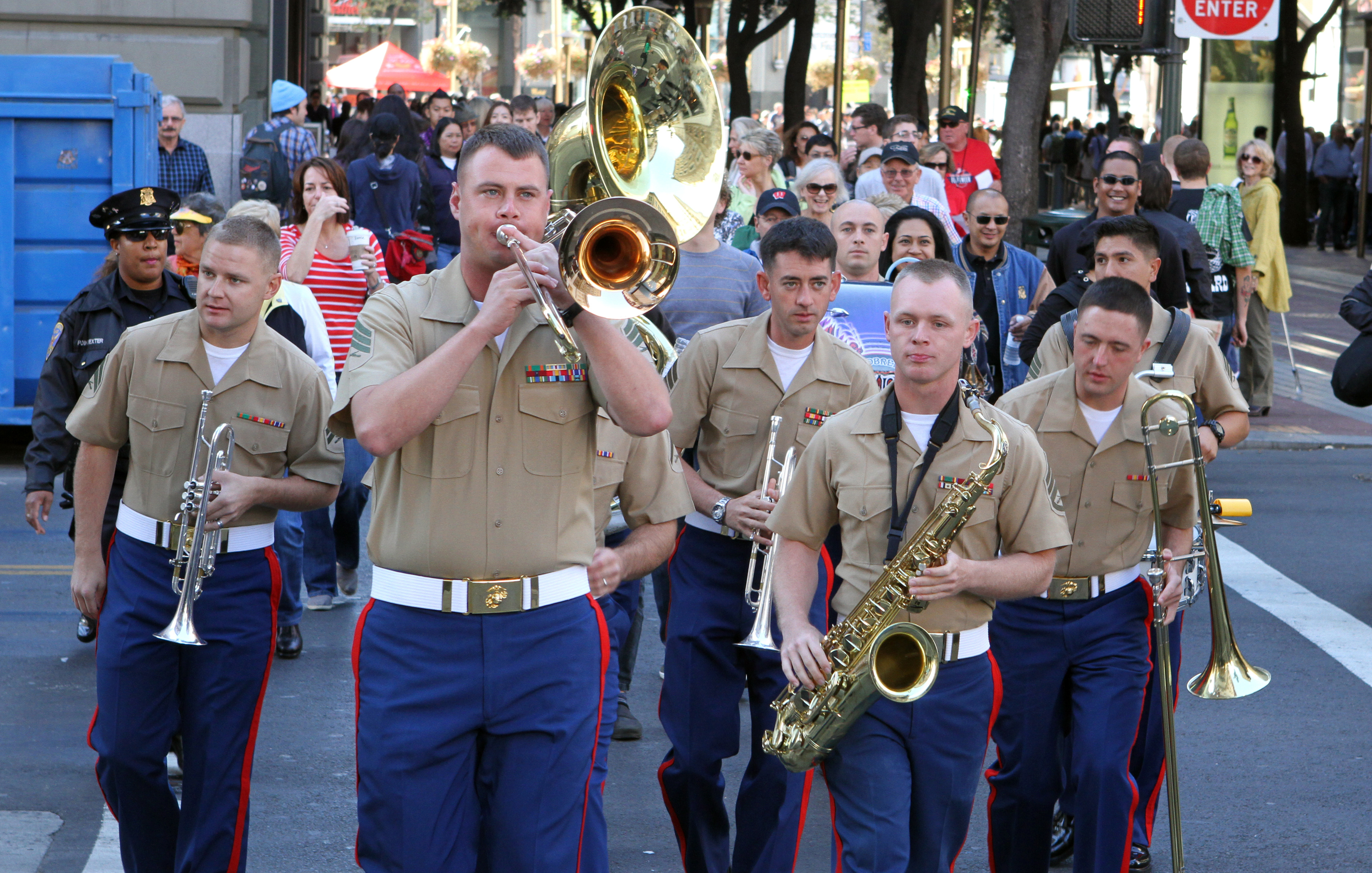

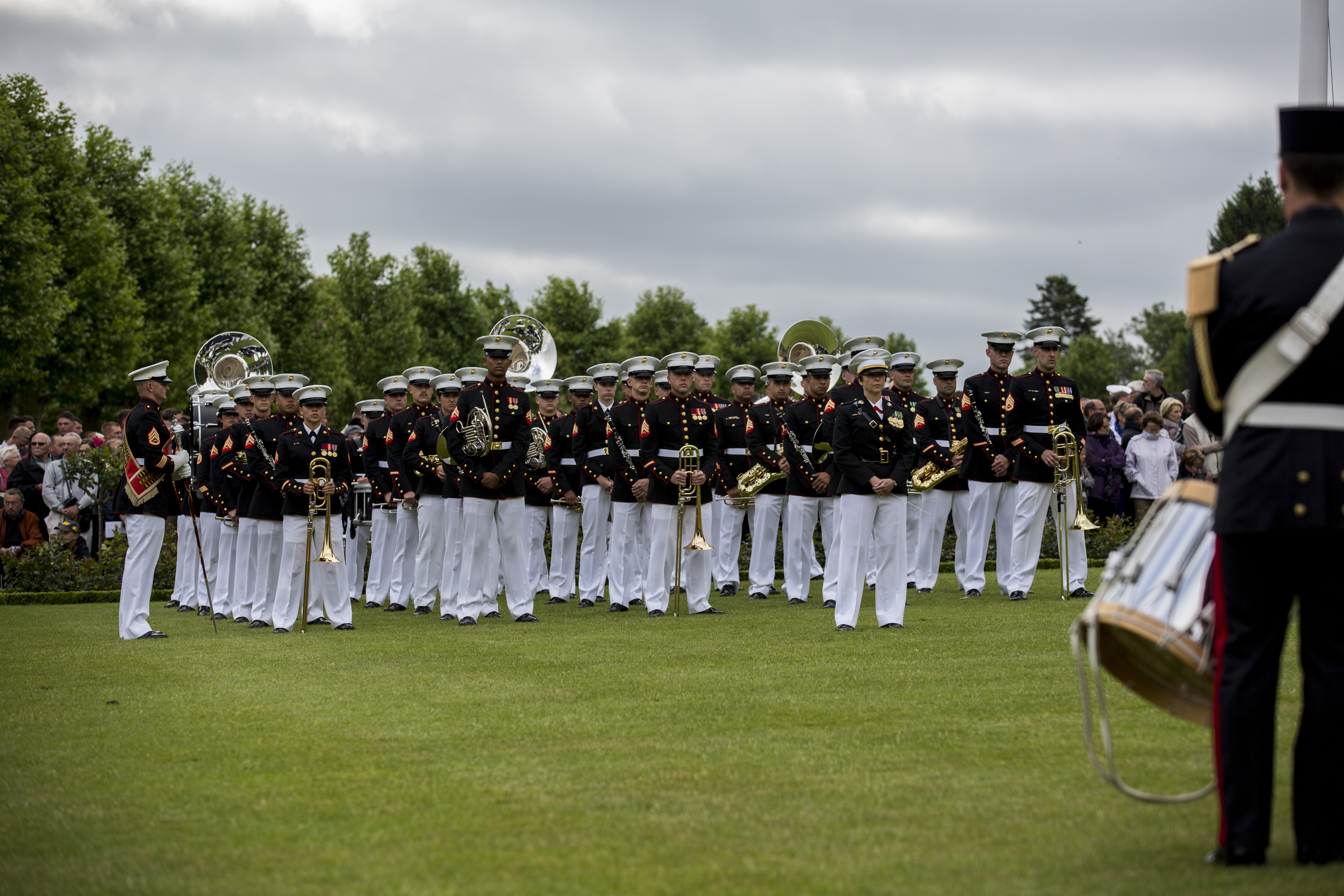

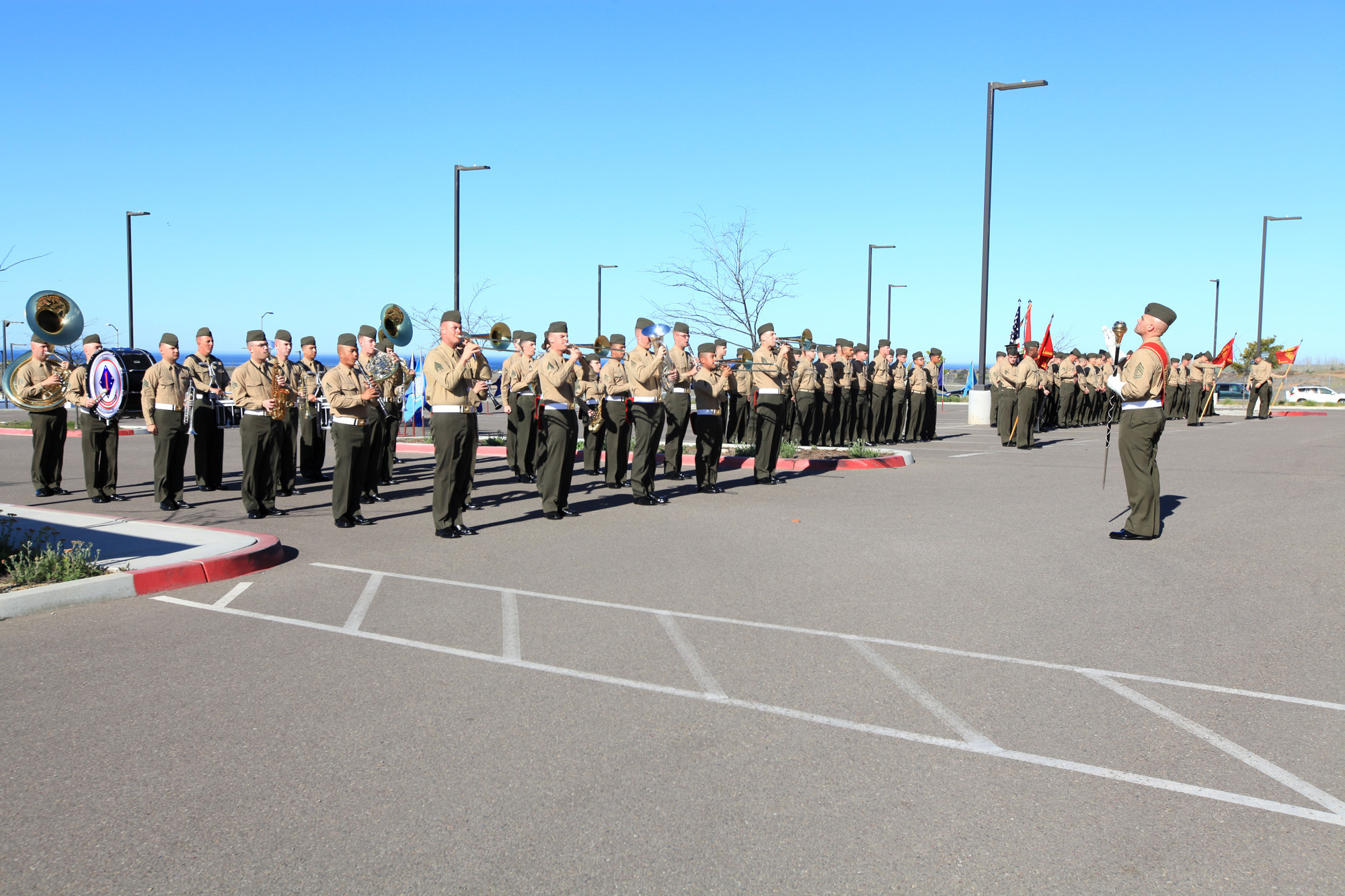

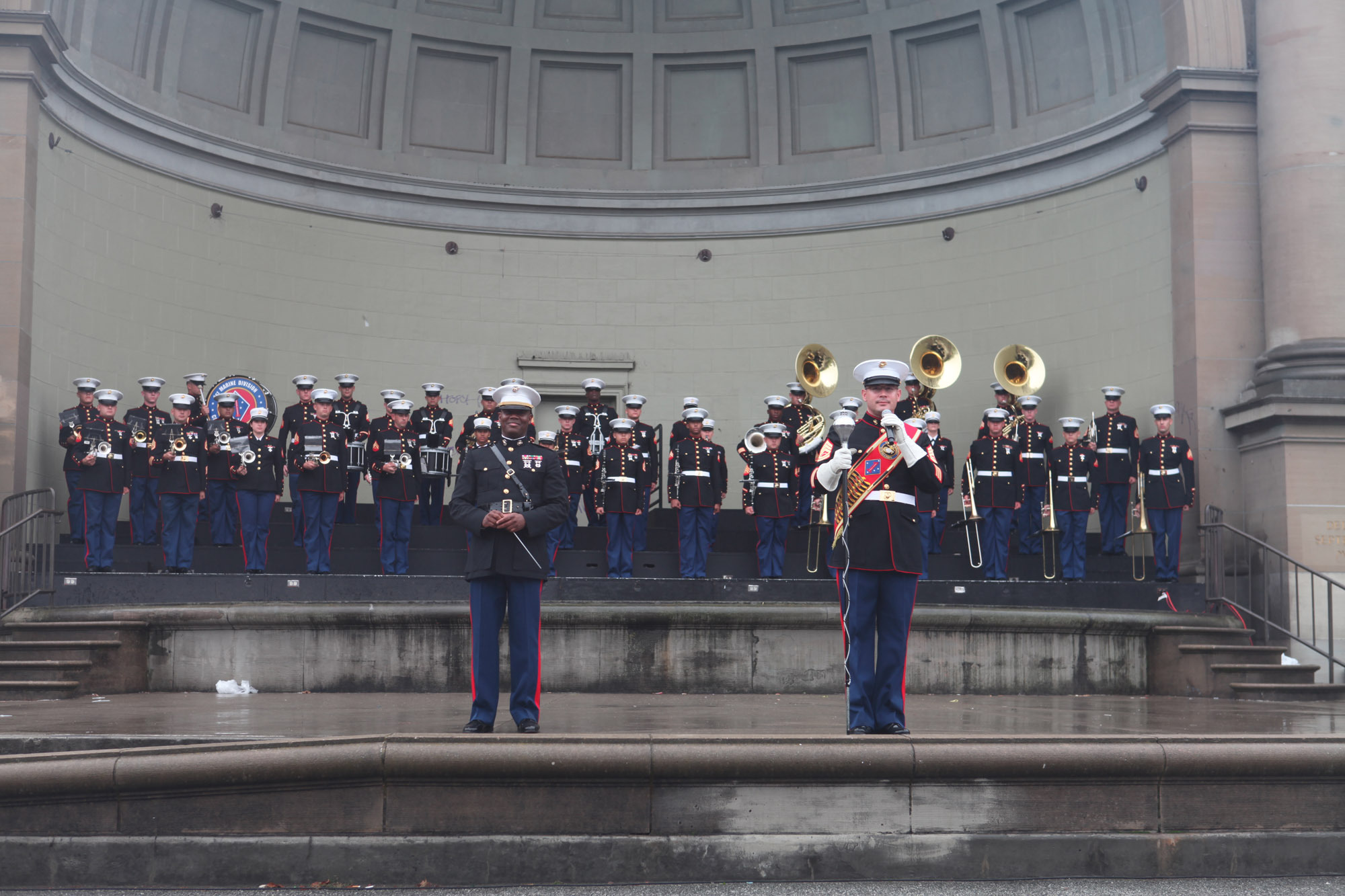
