= Bill Nelson (sound engineer) =

American sound engineer

- Born: April 19, 1945
- Died: August 16, 2021 (aged 76)
- Occupation: Sound engineer
- Years active: 1975-1989

Bill Nelson (April 19, 1945 – August 16, 2021), also known as William Nelson, was an American sound engineer. He was nominated for two Academy Awards in the category Best Sound for the films Heartbreak Ridge and Lethal Weapon.

== Selected filmography ==
- Heartbreak Ridge (1986)
- Lethal Weapon (1987)
