= London Interdisciplinary School =

University in London, England

Coordinates: 51.5169°N 0.0675°W

- The London Interdisciplinary School logo
- Other name: LIS
- Motto: Shape the world. Don't just fit in.
- Type: Private
- Established: 2017; 9 years ago
- Parent institution: emlyon
- Chair: Chris Persson
- CEO: Ed Fidoe
- Academic staff: 20 (2022/23)
- Students: 65 (2022/23)
- Location: London, United Kingdom
- Campus: Urban
- Language: English
- Website: lis.ac.uk

The London Interdisciplinary School (LIS) is a private university in Whitechapel, London and part of the emlyon group.

LIS was founded in 2017 and was the first new institution in the United Kingdom since the 1960s to hold degree-awarding powers from its opening.

The school offers undergraduate and postgraduate taught degrees, as well as professional courses. LIS admitted its first cohort of undergraduate students in 2021, and accepted its first cohort of master's students in 2022.

== History ==
LIS was co-founded by a handful of educationalists and entrepreneurs in 2017. These included CEO Ed Fidoe, previously a manager at McKinsey & Company until leaving to co-found School 21 (a London-based primary and secondary school that focuses on disadvantaged students and emphasises multi-disciplinary education and communication skills) in 2012; company chair Christopher Persson, an entrepreneur who co-founded the online restaurant reservation service Bookatable; and academic lead Carl Gombrich, previously a professor ofi education at University College London where he created its Bachelor of Arts and Sciences degree.

In 2020, the Office for Students, the UK's regulator of higher education, gave LIS the power to award the specific taught degree of BASc (Hons) in Interdisciplinary Problems and Methods from 27 September 2021 to 31 December 2024. This regulatory approval also allowed students to pay fees using the national student loan scheme. An amendment in 2022 added the power to award Master of Arts and Science (MASc) degrees in Interdisciplinary Practice, and a further amendment in 2023 added the MASc in Interdisciplinary Problems and Methods.

Prior to launching, the institution raised money from philanthropists and investors including the founders of Innocent Drinks and the peer-to-peer funding platform Funding Circle. It was also required to demonstrate financial security for at least five years as part of regulatory approval. It has received public funding via the Future Fund, supported by the Treasury and the Department for Business, Energy and Industrial Strategy.

LIS announced a strategic collaboration with emlyon, a French grande école, in 2023, that saw emlyon taking a stake in LIS.

LIS held its first BASc graduation ceremony in September 2024 at the Royal Institution in Mayfair, London.

In January 2025, the Office for Students granted LIS time-limited full degree awarding powers for taught degrees up to master's level until the end of 2028.

In October 2026, LIS was taken over by emlyon, establishing a UK presence for the French business school alongside its sites in Lyon, Paris and Shanghai and reinforcing emlyon's ambition to establish a global management and tech university. The take-over was expected to secure LIS's development of undergraduate, postgraduate and executive education, while maintaining LIS's identity and academic independence.

== Campus ==
LIS is based at 20–30 Whitechapel Road, a site shared with an office building and shared working space in Tower Hamlets. The building is named the People's Mission Hall, after the original headquarters of the Salvation Army that was on the same site. The building was refurbished in 2018. LIS does not own its own halls of residence, but has an agreement with a non-profit student accommodation provider that has halls in Hackney and Bethnal Green.

== Organisation and administration ==
=== Leadership ===
LIS has a board of directors providing oversight, an academic council, and an executive group which is responsible for operational issues. The board members include Andrew Mullinger, co-founder of Funding Circle; Mary Curnock Cook, former CEO of the national university admissions service UCAS; and formerly included writer and broadcaster Kenan Malik. There is also an advisory group which includes corporate leaders and the Chief Superintendent of the Metropolitan Police and formerly included Daisy Christodoulou, author of Seven Myths about Education.

=== Finances ===
Since opening in 2021, LIS has made operating losses of £2.2 million in 2021, £2.9 million in 2022 and £4.1 million in 2023. These have been offset by a share issue in 2023 that raised £13.4 million. In September 2023, emlyon took a minority shareholding in LIS.

== Academic profile ==
=== Teaching ===
As a teaching-focused institution, LIS stated that it intended to participate in the Teaching Excellence Framework (TEF) but not the Research Excellence Framework. However, it did not take part in the 2023 TEF. While it holds time-limited full degree awarding powers allowing it to award taught awards up to master's level, it does not hold university title under British law. (Note: University title in England is granted by the Office for Students. To be eligible, a provider must be registered with the Office for Students and continue to satisfy its conditions of registration, hold degree awarding powers that aren't limited to foundation degrees or time-limited, and have over 55% of students in higher education and 50% or more in courses at level 6 or higher on the Framework for Higher Education Qualifications.)

In contrast to the traditional subject-based approach, the curriculum for the BASc degree is designed around interdisciplinary problem solving. Disciplines such as neuroscience, law, and philosophy are taught in addressing complex problems such as the ethics of AI or the future of cities. The course content includes quantitative and qualitative methods, including machine learning, programming, and game theory. Each year, students complete interdisciplinary research projects in their final term, with the third year culminating in a capstone project.

The LIS fellowship programme brings in interdisciplinary practitioners to give at least one lecture annually at LIS. Notable fellows have included; social philosopher Steve Fuller, psychiatrist Iain McGilchrist, developmental psychologist Howard Gardner, artist Jasmine Pradissitto, ballerina and quantum physicist Merritt Moore, and biomedical engineer David Edwards.

MASc students' complete capstone projects with external reviewers from industry or academia.

LIS has internship and industry connection schemes with a variety of others. Notable partners have included the Bill & Melinda Gates Foundation, the NHS, John Lewis, TfL, UK Health Security Agency, KPMG, JamJar, Entrepreneur First, and emlyon.

=== Reputation and rankings ===
LIS was given a quality and standards review by the Quality Assurance Agency for Higher Education in 2020. This looked at a range of issues, including course design, staffing, student involvement, and transparency. The report stated that the institution met all the criteria that were assessed, with high confidence.

Paul Ashwin, Professor of Higher Education at Lancaster University, has observed that the approach of the LIS has precedents in interdisciplinary polytechnic education and in the "new universities" created in the 1960s. He contrasts LIS' "coherent and carefully designed" approach against other attempts at interdisciplinary education that combine unrelated modules or which focus on generic skills. According to Ashwin "the underlying educational approach [of LIS] looks sound" but some elements of its marketing appeal to perceptions of "elite" higher education which themselves reinforce social inequality.

The philosopher Tom Whyman approves of the goal of a polymathic education to prepare students to address complex problems, but questions whether the LIS will be truly polymathic. Whyman stresses that these problems have a political dimension and that solving them might involve radical changes to existing institutions such as major corporations or the police. Hence, he argues, students face a conflict of interest when the same powerful institutions they could be reforming are involved in their education and work placement. Alex Beard, author of Natural Born Learners and director of the non-profit organisation Teach For All, says that the institution's choice of teaching staff "pitch[es] it firmly in the academic and rigorous, yet progressive and new space, which means it's got a great chance of succeeding with students and policymakers alike."

The World Economic Forum characterised LIS as an "innovative new concept in higher education" which "is taking a new approach to teaching and learning, with a cross-curricular focus on tackling the most important problems facing the world." A leader in The Times observed "a familiar lament that the education system is too narrow for employers who need people who can solve complex problems that cut across traditional disciplinary boundaries" and described it as "encouraging" that corporations are supporting the LIS in its polymathic approach. "The Evening Standard has described LIS as a "revolutionary London university which aims to tackle real world problems". Forbes argues that the multidisciplinary approach championed by LIS is more relevant to today's world than traditional higher education, which was designed for the industrial age: "The number of companies backing the venture highlights the desire for employees with a very different skillset to that produced by universities today."

== Admissions ==
Prospective undergraduates can apply through the university admissions service UCAS, as well as directly to LIS. Admissions to LIS are competitive, and decisions are not focused solely on grades but on each applicant's "background, circumstance and talent", though GCSEs and predicted A-Level grades or equivalent are still taken into account. Every applicant is interviewed by a panel. LIS give out conditional, contextual offers which take into account each applicant's starting point in life.

== See also ==
- Interdisciplinary teaching
- List of alternative universities
- New College of the Humanities at Northeastern
- Minerva University
- Interdisciplinarity
