= Tony's =

Tony's may refer to:

- Tony Awards
- Tony's Pizza, made by the Schwan Food Company
- Tony's Chocolonely, a Dutch confectionery company
