= Nathan Nelson =

Nathan Nelson may refer to:

- Nathan Nelson (biochemist)
- Nathan Nelson (politician)
