= Allan Leighton =

British businessman (born 1953)

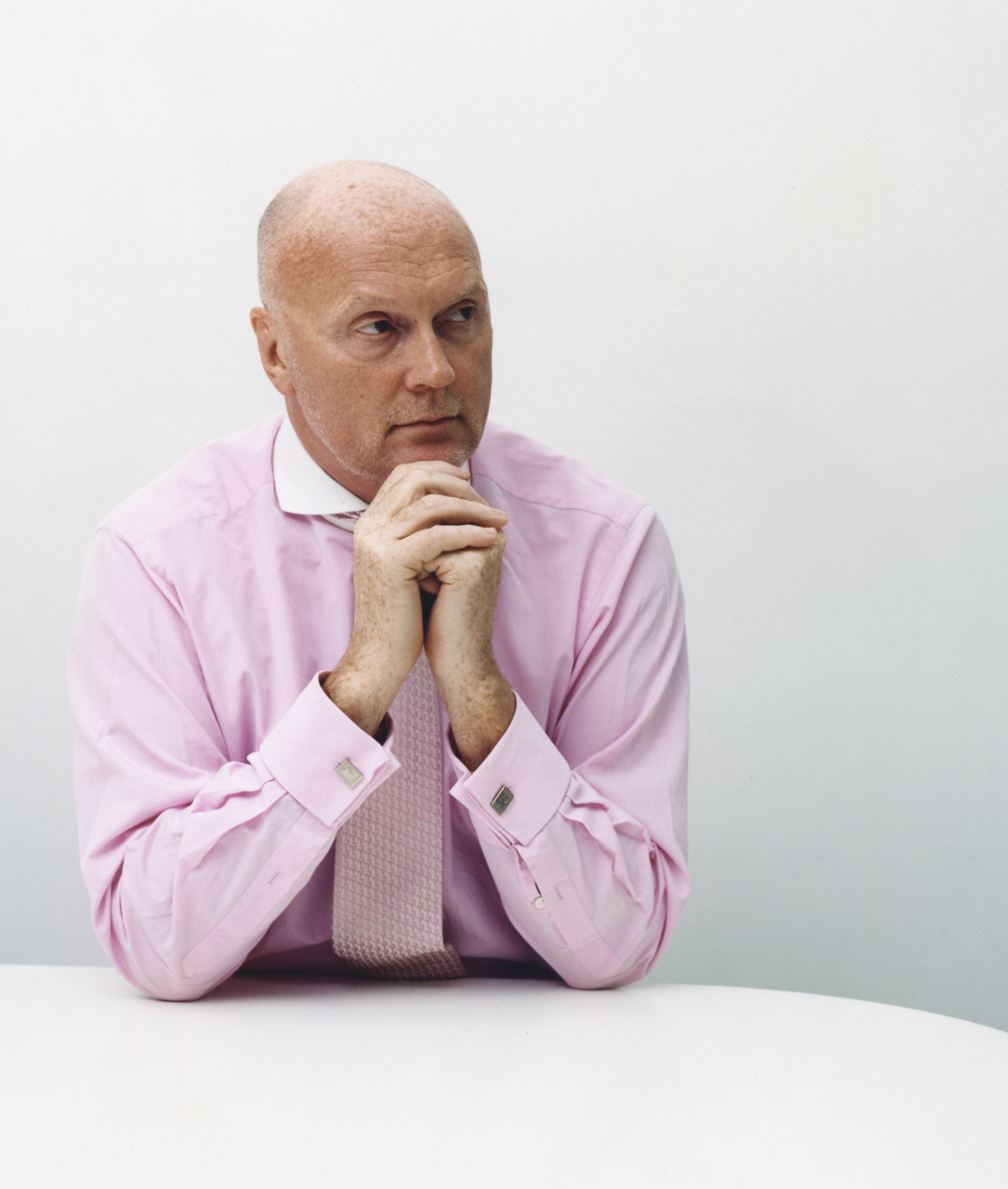
- Leighton in 2007
- Born: 12 April 1953 (age 73); Hereford, England
- Education: Magdalen College School; Oxford Polytechnic
- Known for: Asda (Chair and former CEO); Royal Mail (former chairman); Pandora (former chairman); Loblaw Companies (President)
- Children: 3

Allan Leighton (born 12 April 1953) is a British businessman, chair of Asda, former chairman of The Co-operative Group, former CEO of Asda, former chief executive of Pandora, and former non-executive chairman of the Royal Mail prior to the breaking of the Horizon scandal. He is also the co-owner of Brackley Town F.C.

== Biography ==
Allan Leighton was born on 12 April 1953 in Hereford, the son of a Co-op shop manager, and raised in Oxford. He thought about becoming a professional footballer, but broke his leg in six places aged 15.

He supports Leeds United, where he was deputy chairman, Saracens rugby team, Northamptonshire County Cricket Club and the Toronto Maple Leafs ice hockey team.

=== Career ===
Leighton joined Lloyds Bank as a cashier in 1972. He left to join Mars UK in Slough as a salesman in 1974 and worked at the company for eighteen years, where his colleagues included Justin King, David Cheesewright and Richard Baker. He was appointed General Sales Manager for the UK Grocery Division in 1987 (the youngest director in the company worldwide), and subsequently, managing director of Mars in Ireland and Portugal.

Leighton says he owes a lot to the Mars brothers, who gave him the practical basis for much of what he did at Asda: they would fly economy, hire a car and inspect a factory without warning before management arrived, talking to workers to get a sense of what was going on.

Leaving Mars as marketing and sales director for Pedigree Petfoods, he joined Archie Norman's management team at Asda as marketing director in March 1992. He attended Harvard University's six-week Advanced Management Program.

In 1999, it was reported that an £18 billion merger would happen between Asda and Kingfisher plc, which would see Leighton become deputy chief executive of the enlarged group. However, the merger fell through and the company was sold to the US-based Walmart for £6.2 billion in the same year.

Leighton held several non-executive roles while still at Asda including Deputy Chairman of Leeds United Football Club from 1999 to 2003. After leaving Asda in 2000, he was chairman of Business in the Community from 2000 to 2008, and chairman of Lastminute.com from 2000 to 2004.

Leighton was Chair of Royal Mail Holdings and Post Office Ltd from 2002 to 2009. Duly he was called to give evidence at the Post Office Enquiry into the Horizon Scandal in July 2024.

In 2008 Leighton was appointed president and deputy chairman of Loblaw, the Canadian retail giant and worked alongside the Weston Family.

Leighton received a £3.4 million payoff from his previous employers Pandora, where he was chief executive from July 2013 to August 2014.

In February 2015, The Co-operative Group appointed Leighton as its new independent non-executive chairman, he became the first independent chairman for the business. Leighton was succeeded as Co-op chair by former Sodexo boss Debbie White in February 2024 after a nine year term.

Leighton's later roles included chairman of Simba Sleep from August 2018, chairman of C&A from 2020, and chairman at BrewDog from September 2021. He also served as a non-executive director at Dyson, BSkyB and Scottish Power.

In November 2024, Leighton was appointed Executive Chairman of the British supermarket chain Asda, returning to the business after 24 years.

== Awards and nominations ==
In 2010, the University of Central Lancashire awarded him an honorary fellowship, in recognition of his achievements.

== Publications ==
- On Leadership (2008) Ghostwritten by Teena Lyons.
- Tough Calls (2012) Ghostwritten by Teena Lyons.

== Support for charity ==
Leighton took part in the 2008 London Marathon to raise money for Breast Cancer Care, a charity to which he pledges all his earnings from television, speeches and his book On Leadership.
