= Simba Sleep =

British online mattress company

Simba Sleep Limited
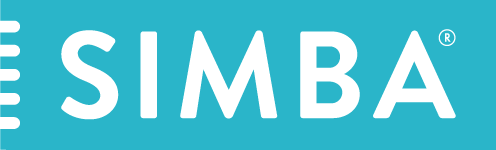
- Type: Privately held company
- Industry: Mattresses
- Founded: 2015
- Founder: Steve Reid; James Cox; Andrew McClements; Harry McClements
- Headquarters: London, United Kingdom
- Area served: Europe; Asia; North America
- Products: Mattresses; Pillows; Bedding; Mattress Toppers
- Number of employees: 155
- Website: simbasleep.com

Simba Sleep Limited (also known as Simba) is a British online mattress group that was founded in 2015. It manufactures and sells mattresses, bedding and other sleep products in several countries, including the UK, Canada and China. Simba's retail partnerships include John Lewis, Costco & Argos in the UK and Sleep Country stores in Canada.

== History ==
Simba Sleep was co-founded in 2015 in the UK by Steve Reid, James Cox and the McClements family. The name of the company was suggested by Cox as it was a pet name he used for his partner.

Within the first year of the company's launch, Simba Sleep sold its first hybrid mattress within the UK. The company designed the mattress after analysing body profiling data from 10 million people around the world, in conjunction with the Sleep to Live Institute, and manufactured it in a factory in Derby, England.

In March 2016, Simba raised £1 million in funding from investors including Sir John Hegarty, as well as Richard Reed, co-founder of Innocent Drinks, and Tom Teichman.

Simba's initial investment round was followed by its Series A raise of £5 million in October 2016, as investors looked to support the brands’ overseas growth in markets such as France and Canada. The company received a further £9 million investment in February 2017, before unveiling another £40 million injection of funds in November 2017. The Series B round was led by venture capital firm Atami Capital and included backers, such as Nigel Wray, chairman of Saracens rugby union club, and the Swiss private bank Lombard Odier.

In April 2017, Simba hired the Real Madrid and Wales international footballer Gareth Bale to lead a promotional campaign, which included the development of an airplane seat designed to maximise sleep.

The British businessman Allan Leighton succeeded Tom Teichman to become chairman of Simba Sleep in August 2018, while continuing to serve as chairman of The Co-operative Group.

After working with Gareth Bale, the company named England rugby player Maro Itoje in July 2019 as the star of its next UK marketing campaign, which included the launch of an app that monitors sleep patterns.

At the start of 2020, Simba became operational in nine countries across Europe, Asia, and North America and secured a further $24 million in investment from the American private equity firm Cartesian Capital.

Simba Sleep has agreed to modify its online sales practices following an investigation by the UK Competition and Markets Authority (CMA). The investigation, launched in December 2023, raised concerns that the company may have misled customers about price reductions and applied undue pressure to make quick purchases. As part of undertakings, Simba Sleep has pledged to ensure that any “was” price reflects a genuine prior sale of the product at that price. Also, clarify the use of countdown clocks on its website, specifying which products they apply to and ensuring they do not create a false sense of urgency or mislead consumers about pricing changes.

== Products ==
Simba Sleep's standard mattress consists of five layers of foam and 2,500 conical springs, which allow it to be folded in two and vacuum-packed into a cardboard box. In October 2019, Simba Sleep launched a premium version of its regular hybrid mattress, which contained 5,000 springs.

Simba also launched a duvet containing Outlast, a technology that was originally developed for NASA to protect astronauts from temperature changes during space exploration. The company has since developed its own version of the technology, known as Stratos, which it uses in its duvets and pillows.

== See also ==
- Casper Sleep
- Ecosa Group
