= Cheesewright =

Cheesewright is an English surname. Notable people with the surname include:

- David Cheesewright (born 1968), CEO of Walmart International
- John Cheesewright (born 1973), English footballer

== Fictional characters ==
- G. D'Arcy "Stilton" Cheesewright, fictional character in two Jeeves novels by P. G. Wodehouse
