= Nirith Nelson =

Israeli art curator (born 1968)

- נירית נלסון
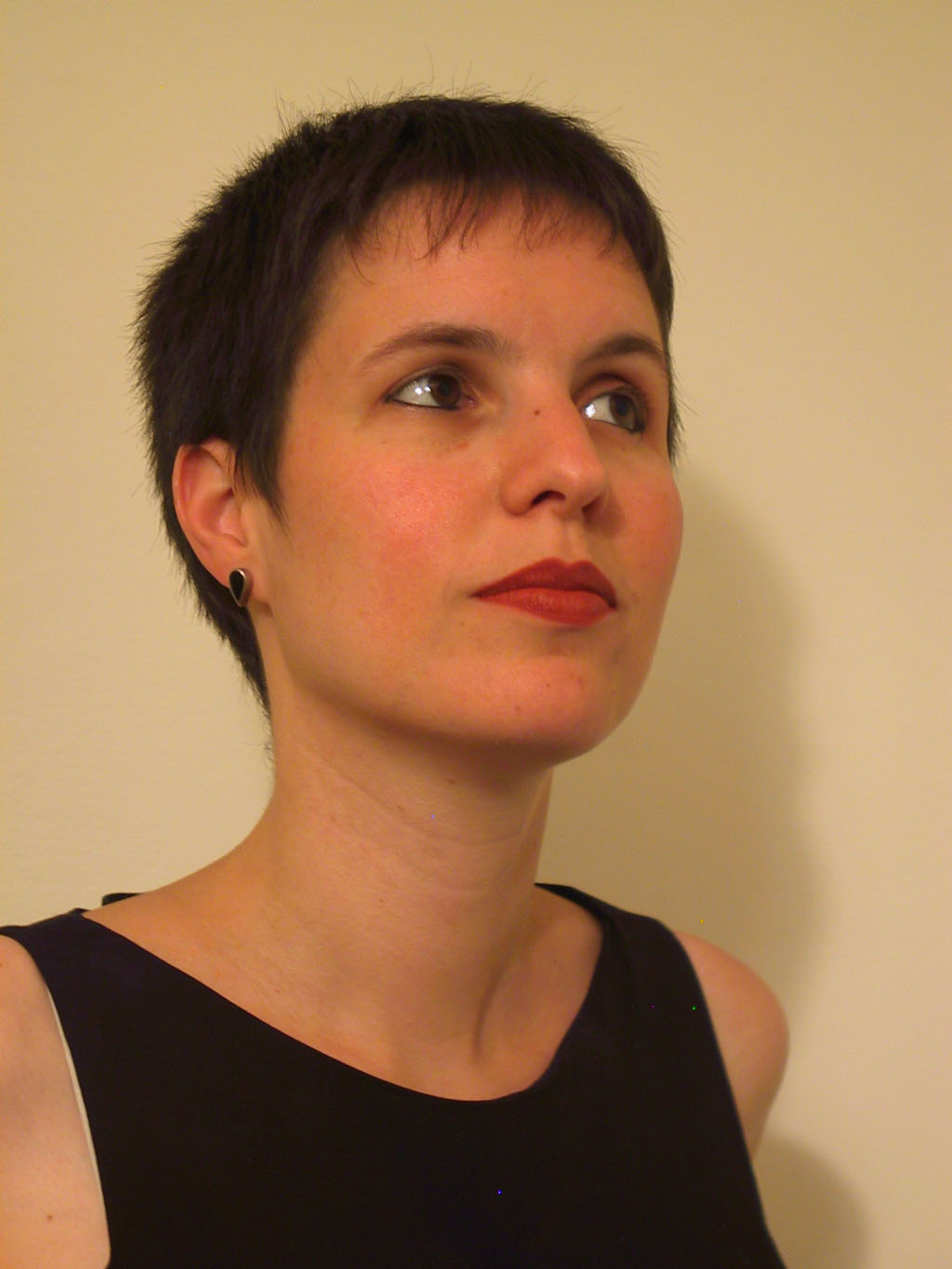
- Born: 1968 (age 57–58); Tel Aviv, Israel
- Education: Hebrew University of Jerusalem
- Occupation: Art curator
- Employer: Jerusalem Center for the Visual Arts

Nirith Nelson (Hebrew: נירית נלסון; born 1968, in Tel Aviv) is a contemporary art and design curator and art educator. She is the art director of the Residency Program of the Jerusalem Center for the Visual Arts.

== Professional life ==
Nelson studied Art History at the Hebrew University of Jerusalem. During her studies for the master's degree she began her work at the Israel Museum, where for nine years she practiced curatorial work and public speaking on art and design. She is on the faculty of the Bezalel Academy of Art and Design since 2000. Since 2002, she developed and ran the JCVA Artists Residency program, where she screens and invites international artists and curators and creates individually-tailored programs for each in line with their artistic interests. Special projects that enrich visiting artists as well as the local art milieu, including exhibitions, lectures, workshops and multidisciplinary seminars were initiated and encouraged.

For 13 years, she was the art advisor of the Jerusalem Foundation, where she was responsible for the selection, concept, and integration of artworks into Jerusalem’s urban landscape, and where she worked with both local and international artists. Nelson initiated innovative projects in visual as well as interdisciplinary arts throughout the city. Almost all projects were community-based and related to the human environment they were immersed in.

Within this framework, Nirith Nelson initiated several successful projects such as the Dwek Gallery in Mishkenot Sha’ananim and the Art Cube Gallery at the Artists studios, which she managed artistically. She founded the Daniela Pasal Centre for Media Art, and founded and directed the successful Moonlight Cinema Festival. Nelson also curated the Mishkenot Photography Collection, which became one of Israel’s most prominent collections of contemporary Israeli photography, and was responsible for many other long-lasting public art projects in the city of Jerusalem.

She has also served as an art advisor to many other institutions, consulted for many artists and designers, and participated in numerous symposia. She has also served as a judge for several art and design committees, including among others The Andy Bronfman Prize, the Crate and Barrel prize, and the Israeli Ministry of Culture Prize. Nelson’s vivid lectures on contemporary art and design have drawn large audiences since her days at the Israel Museum.

== Personal life ==
Nirith Nelson is the daughter of Hannah and Nathan Nelson. She has a sister Lee-Bath Nelson (High Tech Executive and VC), and a brother Ben Nelson (Founder of The Minerva Project).

== Selected exhibitions curated by Nirith Nelson ==
=== Bill of Lading ===
Bill of Lading – with Rotem Ruff. A joint exhibition of Raqs Media Collective from India and Nevet Yitzhak from Israel at the Herzliya Museum for Contemporary Art, May 2014. This exhibition was the fruit of an exchange project of two concurrent residencies in 2011. Raqs Media Collective were invited to the JCVA and Yizhak was invited to Khoj (International Artists’ Association) in New Delhi. Raqs Media Collective presented three works: The Capital of Accumulation (relating to Rosa Luxemburg); More Salt in your Tears and Bloom (which resulted from their visit to the Dead Sea). Nevet Yitzhak presented a large installation titled The Concert, which corresponds with Vermeer’s painting of the same name.

=== I Am an Other ===
I Am an Other – contemporary conceptual jewelry biennale. Thirty-five jewelry designers and artists presented their work at the Eretz Israel Museum in Tel Aviv, June 2012. Nelson asked the jewelry designers to create a piece for themselves that would also reflect their inner self. She entered into a dialogue with each artist, accompanied the development of the piece, and initiated a singular photography project that accompanied the exhibition catalogue, wherein each artist’s portrait was taken with the one-of-a-kind jewelry piece they produced.

=== Stairway ===
Stairway – installation by Polish artist Monika Sosnowska, at the Herzliya Museum of Contemporary Art, September 2010. Sosnowska came to the JCVA residency in 2008. She was offered a private and detailed architectural tour of Tel Aviv, which became one of the reference points for this installation.

=== Observatory Gallery ===
Observatory Gallery – a one-person show by London-based Japanese artist Hiraki Sawa, was part of Video Zone, the Video Art Biennale, at the Herzliya Museum for Contemporary Art, November 2004. Hiraki Sawa showed what later turned to be his landmark works: Spotter, Airliner and Dwelling. Following this exposure, Sawa was embraced by the art community in Israel and was shown at the Israel Museum, the Petach Tikva Museum, the Haifa Museum and the Tel Aviv Museum. In addition, his work Going Places, Sitting Down was bought for the permanent collection of the Israel Museum. Following his JCVA residency he made another well-received piece named Passer-by.

=== Domains ===
Domains – Contemporary Israeli Design, traveling exhibition: Tokyo Designers Block, Tokyo (October 2002); International Design Center, Nagoya (December 2002); Jintai Museum, Beijing (February 2003); the New Expo Center, Pudong, Shanghai (March 2003); Seoul Arts Center – Hangaram Design Museum, Seoul (September 2003); Taipei Fine Arts Museum, Taipei (December 2003); UTS Gallery, Sydney (April 2004); RMIT Gallery, Melbourne (May 2004), Indira Gandhi Gallery, New Delhi, (March 2005). This exhibition, which featured 13 Israeli designers, was the result of an invitation by Teruo Kurosaki, who met Nelson in an international design event in London. Nelson was the only guest curator at the Tokyo Design Block. The Domains exhibition was presented in three venues in Tokyo, as the Tokyo Design Block takes place throughout the city. The response to the exhibition was so overwhelming that it sprouted invitations to seven other venues in the Far East and the Pacific. The exhibition traveled for over two years and opened many doors for participating Israeli designers and others as well.
