= Carl Gombrich =

British academic

Professor Carl Gombrich
- Born: Carl Asoka Gombrich; September 1965 (age 61)
- Occupations: Academic Lead and Head of Teaching and Learning at LIS; Academic Director at UCL BASc (former)
- Children: 2
- Parent: Richard Gombrich (father)
- Relatives: Ernst Gombrich (grandfather) Carl Joachim Friedrich (grandfather) Carl R. de Boor (uncle)

Academic background
- Education: King's College London National Opera Studio University of London

Academic work
- Main interests: Interdisciplinary teaching, British Opera
- Website: www.carlgombrich.org

Carl Gombrich is a British interdisciplinary educator, academic, former opera singer and co-founder of the London Interdisciplinary School.

== Early life and education ==
Carl Gombrich was born in 1965, to Dorothea Amanda Friedrich and to renowned British Indologist and scholar, Richard Gombrich. He is the grandson of Austrian-born art historian Ernst Gombrich.

Gombrich has degrees in mathematics, physics and philosophy.

== Career ==
=== Opera ===
From 2000 to 2001, Gombrich was the Royal Opera House Scholar at the National Opera Studio, where he sang bass. He has performed in various operatic roles, such as Masetto in Don Giovanni with the Garsington Opera, as Gianettino in Fiesque, and as Macduff in Ernest Bloch's Macbeth at the University College Opera.

=== Academic & Program director at University College London ===
Gombrich joined University College London (UCL) in 2002 as a lecturer. The following year, he became a Teaching Fellow in Physics. He then became Principal of the University Preparatory Certificates, directing UCL's international foundation courses, which aid students coming from abroad to gain the skills to study at UK universities.

In 2010, Gombrich was appointed Programme Director of UCL Arts and Sciences, leading the design, development and implementation of the degree, which began accepting students in 2012. This program was one of the first of its kind in the United Kingdom to offer a liberal arts degree. He directed the program until 2019.

He was a member of the British Academy Working Group on Interdisciplinarity, led by David Soskice, which in 2016 published a report titled 'Crossing paths: interdisciplinary institutions, careers, education and applications', alongside other notable academics such as Colette Fagan, Tom McLeish, Professor Georgina Born, Julia Black, Barry C. Smith and Graeme Reid. Gombrich was also a core member of the NVAO accreditation panel for the Liberal Arts and Sciences Colleges of the Netherlands.

Gombrich is a regular speaker at events on interdisciplinary and liberals arts and sciences, both in the UK and abroad.

Gombrich also writes academic papers on interdisciplinarity and the philosophy of education, as well as music.

=== Foundation of the London Interdisciplinary School ===
In 2017, Gombrich founded the London Interdisciplinary School alongside Chris Persson and Ed Fidoe, where he is the Academic Lead and Head of Teaching and Learning. This university aims to provide students with an interdisciplinary, practical education, and admitted its first undergraduate cohort in 2021.

== Publications ==
- Expressions of Inexpressible Truths: Attempts at Descriptions of Mystical and Musical Experiences. The World of Music, 2008.
- Polymathy, New Generalism, and the Future of Work: A Little Theory and Some Practice from UCL’s Arts and Sciences Degree. In book: Experiences in Liberal Arts and Science Education from America, Europe, and Asia, pp. 75–89, 2016.
- What Sort of Interdisciplinary Research Can Undergraduates Do?. Interdisciplinary Science Reviews, 2016
- Interdisciplinarity and the Student Voice In book: The Oxford Handbook of Interdisciplinarity (2nd Edition) ISBN 9780198733522, 2017
- Integrating Sciences and Engineering in the Liberal Arts Curriculum In book: Encyclopedia of Educational Philosophy and Theory, pp. 1–6, 2017
- The academic Caesar: university leadership is hard Comparative Education, 2017
- Academic Blogging in The Digitally Agile Researcher http://www.digitallyagile.com/. University College London, 2017.
- Gombrich, Carl and Navarro, Virginia and Blackmore, Isabelle and Blumberg, Jacopo and Cox, Emily and Hodges-Smikle, Graham and Lin, Jiaqi and Orr, Charles. Challenges of interdisciplinary courses containing research-based learning components: Ways to Connect Research and Teaching. In book: ISBN 9781787351127, pp. 270–274, 2018.
- Implementing Interdisciplinary Curricula: Some Philosophical and Practical Remarks. European Review, 2018.

== Academic appointments ==
- Teaching Fellow in Physics at UCL
- Professorial Teaching Fellow in Interdisciplinary Education at UCL
- Principal Fellow of the Higher Education Academy

== Personal life ==
Gombrich is married and has two children. In interviews, he references his pastimes as singing, reading, and watching Arsenal.
