= Woof! =

British children's television series (1989–1997)

- Original 1989 title
- Written by: Allan Ahlberg; Richard Fegen; Andrew Norriss; Graham Alborough
- Directed by: David Cobham
- Starring: Edward Fidoe (1989–1993); Adam Roper (1993–1997); Sebastian Mahjouri (1997); Liza Goddard; Thomas Aldwinckle; Sarah Smart; Lizzie Mickery; John Bowler; Monty Allan; Owen Brenman; Faye Jackson (1997); Jack Allen (1997)
- Theme music composer: Paul Lewis
- Country of origin: United Kingdom
- Original language: English
- No. of series: 9
- No. of episodes: 69

Production
- Executive producer: Lewis Rudd
- Producer: David Cobham
- Running time: 25 minutes
- Production company: Central Independent Television

Original release
- Network: ITV (CITV)
- Release: 18 February 1989 – 19 February 1997

Woof! is a British children's television series produced by Central Independent Television about the adventures of a boy who shapeshifts into a dog. Based on the book by Allan Ahlberg (who wrote several episodes of the series), it was directed and produced by David Cobham. Co-writers Richard Fegen and Andrew Norriss novelised the second, third and fourth series as Woof! The Tale Wags On, Woof! The Tale Gets Longer and Woof! A Twist in the Tale, respectively.

== History ==
The show was first broadcast in 1989. It starred Liza Goddard as teacher Mrs Jessop. Edward Fidoe played Eric Banks, the boy who turned into a dog (played by Pippin from Come Outside) of the same name. It also starred Thomas Aldwinckle as Eric's best friend Roy Ackerman, and later Sarah Smart as his new best friend Rachel Hobbs, who moves into Roy's old house. Filming was interrupted for a while when Smart suffered a broken leg.

The show generally featured weekly escapades to do with the dog power. In the third series of Eric's run of episodes, the start of a plot arc was developed, with Eric suspecting the transition be caused by adrenaline, as it happens when he is hot or excited, and meeting up with an adult named Bruce Bentley (played by Anthony Head), who has the same affliction when Eric wonders whether it ever happened to anyone else. In the first series, Eric's condition is caused by his younger sister Emily wanting a dog. Eric stopped transforming after he bought her a dog, but he started again with his friend Roy wanting one, too.

From series 6, which began airing in 1993, the episodes featured the adventures of Rex Thomas (played by Adam Roper) and his best friend Michael Tully (Monty Allan). Rex "inherits" Eric's "condition" when Eric is unlikely to turn into a dog again as stated in a cameo featuring Eric and Rachel at the start of series 6 to explain their absence from this point. Lionel Jeffries guest starred in series 6 as Rex's grandfather, who is the only one in Rex's house who knows about his condition. In the final episode of series 8 he becomes Mrs Jessop's stepson after she marries his father, Ken (Owen Brenman).

The ninth and final series, consisting of seven episodes, was produced in 1996, but aired in January to February 1997. It features Jim Walters (Sebastian Mahjouri), accompanied by his cousin Brian Barford (Jack Allen) and next door neighbour Carrie Howard (Faye Jackson), whose previous dog Beth had recently died and her desire for another dog causes Jim's condition shortly after he moved in. By the time the show ended, Liza Goddard was the only original cast member to feature through all nine series.

The programme featured several well-known actors over the years. Leslie Grantham appeared in some episodes as Mr Garrett, a ruthless dog warden from the local dog pound. Stephen Fry appeared in one episode, as a cartoonist whose work is disrupted by Grandad and Rex. Others include Ruth Madoc, Anita Dobson, Penelope Keith, Leslie Phillips, John Ringham, Bill Pertwee, Julian Fellowes and Andrew Sachs.

Four dogs starred across the nine series. Pippin starred as Eric the dog in the first series. She also starred in Children's BBC programme Come Outside and a number of educational films. She was owned and trained by Ann Head, and was the offspring of one of the dogs who played Benji. Tich was the second dog to play Eric, starring in series 2 to 5. Punch, a small white dog, played Rex the Dog. Tinka appeared as Jim the dog in the final series.

Series 1 to 4 were filmed around the suburb of Moseley in Birmingham. Towards the end of series 4, and for the remainder of the show's run, production moved to Nottingham and much location filming took place in and around West Bridgford, a suburb just south of Nottingham, Keyworth, a large village seven miles south of Nottingham, and various other Nottinghamshire towns. The change in location is explained by having Eric's family move to get a bigger house with his mother expecting twins. The school used during filming is Wilford Meadows Comprehensive located in Wilford. The school has since been demolished and a new school, (The Nottingham Emmanuel School), was built on the land.

The show was broadcast in Australia at 6:50 am on weekdays on 7TWO from April 2010. In New Zealand, the series first aired on Channel 2 in February 1990.

== Series guide ==
With Edward Fidoe

- Series 1: 4 episodes – 18 February 1989 – 11 March 1989
- Series 2: 7 episodes – 23 November 1989 – 11 January 1990
- Series 3: 8 episodes – 20 February 1991 – 17 April 1991
- Series 4: 7 episodes – 10 January 1992 – 21 February 1992
- Series 5: 6 episodes – 7 October 1992 – 11 November 1992

With Adam Roper

- Series 6: 10 episodes – 13 October 1993 – 15 December 1993
- Series 7: 10 episodes – 12 October 1994 – 14 December 1994
- Series 8: 10 episodes – 5 October 1995 – 14 December 1995

With Sebastian Mahjouri

- Series 9: 7 episodes – 8 January 1997 – 19 February 1997

== Home video releases ==
The series was released in the United Kingdom on VHS but, despite being a British programme, it has never been released beyond that in the UK.

A DVD release, entitled Woof, which consists of the entire series 1 cut into one feature, is available in the United States coded Region 1. Series 3 was released on DVD in the United States as A Boy Called Woof! (consisting of the first half of the series edited into one feature) and A Boy Called Woof! Back in the Dog House (with the second half of the series).

The first episode was made available to stream on the Britbox library and Apple TV in the 2020s.
