= Stephen Kosslyn =

American psychologist, neuroscientist, and expert on learning (Born: 1948)

Stephen M. Kosslyn
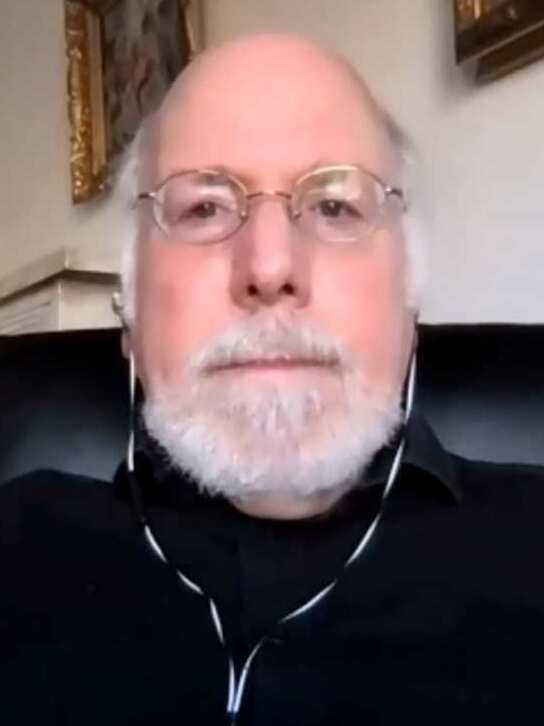
- Kosslyn in 2021
- Born: 1948 (age 77–78); California, U.S.
- Education: University of California, Los Angeles (BA); Stanford University (PhD)
- Awards: NAS Award for Initiatives in Research, Guggenheim fellowship, Cattell Award, Prix Jean-Louis Signoret
- Scientific career
- Fields: Cognitive neuroscience; learning sciences; cognitive psychology
- Workplaces: Minerva University; Stanford University; Harvard University

Stephen M. Kosslyn (born 1948) is an American psychologist and neuroscientist. He is a former chair of the psychology department and dean of social sciences at Harvard University, where he is a professor emeritus. Kosslyn is also the founder and CEO of Active Learning Sciences, Inc., which provides AI software to educational companies.

== Work ==
Kosslyn was an early contributor to cognitive science and then was one of the founders of cognitive neuroscience. His research areas include mental imagery, the neural bases of visual cognition, and the science of learning.

=== Mental imagery ===
Kosslyn's research addressed the "imagery debate," a long-standing controversy in cognitive science over whether mental images are depictive or propositional. Beginning with computational modelling studies in the 1970s and later incorporating neuroimaging and transcranial magnetic stimulation research, Kosslyn argued that multiple lines of evidence supported the depictive view of mental imagery. In 2015, he and Joel Pearson co-authored a paper The Heterogeneity of Mental Representation: Ending the Imagery Debate.

His research areas include mental imagery, the neural bases of visual cognition, and the science of learning. His studies demonstrated that people take longer to mentally scan greater distances across objects in their mental images. He also found that people could detect more details of objects in their mental images when they mentally "zoomed in" on them. In addition, he documented that the size and shape of the "mental screen" on which visualized objects appear is similar in scope and shape to the field of visual attention in perception (when actually seeing, not visualizing with eyes closed). He and his colleagues also demonstrated that depictive visual mental imagery can be implemented in computational systems. These models posited that visual mental imagery relies on distinct sets of processing components.

=== Visual cognition ===
Kosslyn proposed a detailed theory of how visual information is stored and accessed in the brain during cognition. According to this theory, visual mental images are generated into the occipital cortex when we need high resolution. After they are generated into this structure, they can be interpreted and transformed via interactions with specific other brain areas. Kosslyn and his colleagues showed that the left cerebral hemisphere relies on "categorical" spatial representations, whereas the right cerebral hemisphere relies on metric, "coordinate", representations. Kosslyn and his colleagues showed that visual mental imagery relies on most of the same brain regions that underlie visual perception.

Kosslyn's research has examined individual differences in cognitive style, including distinctions between object visualisers, who tend to process detailed pictorial images, and spatial visualisers, who tend to process spatial relationships and transformations. His studies have also examined the implications of these differences for cognitive processing and education.

Kosslyn has also conducted research on the neural correlates of deception, including studies investigating patterns of brain activity associated with different forms of deceptive behaviour. In addition, he was involved in the development of the MiniCog Rapid Assessment Battery, a portable cognitive assessment system developed with funding from NASA and the National Space Biomedical Research Institute for evaluating cognitive performance during long-duration space missions.

=== Cognitive science in education ===
Kosslyn has attempted to apply principles from cognitive science to improve how people learn, such as using cognitive principles to make data displays—such as graphs, charts, and diagrams—easier to understand. He developed guidelines for creating effective PowerPoint slides and other forms of visual communication.

Kosslyn has also proposed ways to design online courses based on principles from cognitive science. Kosslyn proposed the concept of the "Cognitive Amplifier Loop"—a procedure that is intended to help humans interact with AI.

In 2025, Kosslyn, Elizabeth P. Callaghan, and David P. Green proposed "Dynamic Personalized Learning", an AI-assisted teaching method in which AI dynamically provides feedback and adjusts the level and pace of instruction according to individual learners.

== Biography ==
Kosslyn attended graduate school at Stanford University and received a PhD in psychology from Stanford in 1974. After an appointment as assistant professor of psychology at Johns Hopkins, he joined the faculty at Harvard in 1977, where he later served as the departmental chair, Dean of Social Sciences, and the John Lindsley Professor. He also was codirector of the Mind of the Market Lab at Harvard Business School and was an associate in the department of neurology at the Massachusetts General Hospital. Kosslyn served as director of Stanford University's Center for Advanced Study in the Behavioral Sciences from 2011 to 2013. During his directorship, he launched the center's annual summit, bringing together researchers from fields including behavioral economics, organizational behavior, creativity, and innovation. Following this, Kosslyn was the Founding Dean and Chief Academic Officer of the Minerva Schools (now Minerva University). He then was the founder and chief academic officer of Foundry College, an online two-year college.

He is founder and CEO of Active Learning Sciences, Inc.

Awards Kosslyn has won include the National Academy of Sciences Initiatives in Research Award, three honorary doctorates (from the University of Caen, France; the University of Paris-Descartes, France; the University of Bern, Switzerland), and a Guggenheim fellowship, He was elected to the American Academy of Arts and Sciences, and the Society of Experimental Psychologists. He was also elected a Fellow of the American Association for the Advancement of Science (1987) and a Fellow of the American Psychological Association (1984), and was elected to Academia Rodinensis pro Remediatione in Switzerland.

=== Ties with Jeffrey Epstein ===
Between 1998 and 2002, Harvard received $200,000 in donations from Jeffrey Epstein to support Kosslyn's research. In 2003 Kosslyn contributed a note to Jeffrey Epstein's birthday book (where he was classified as a "scientist" and not a "friend"). In 2008, Kosslyn visited Epstein in Palm Beach County Jail.

A Harvard report stated that Kosslyn had known Epstein for several years and supported Epstein's application as a visiting fellow in the psychology department in 2005. The report also addressed Epstein's donations to Harvard and the disclosure of those donations during the application process. Epstein withdrew from the appointment in 2006 following his arrest.

In a 2016 deposition, Virginia Roberts Giuffre was asked whether she had ever had sex with Kosslyn and answered "No." Her lawyer also indicated that she had not had sex with Kosslyn. An early version of a book by Giuffre, then called The Billionaire's Playboy Club, had named Kosslyn as someone she was required to have sex with, but the description of the perpetrator was changed and Kosslyn's name was removed from the published version, Nobody's Girl (page 133).

In February 2026, The Wall Street Journal reported that emails between Kosslyn and Epstein continued around the time of Epstein's 2008 conviction and included discussions about Epstein's public image. The correspondence included Kosslyn's assistance with drafting material for reporters, according to the Journal. Bloomberg News reported that in June 2008, around the time Epstein was beginning his jail sentence, Kosslyn replied to a message from Epstein with “DAMN! Let me know how/if I can help,” in the context of email correspondence between the two.

According to the Harvard Crimson, Kosslyn has previously said that he was unaware of Epstein’s sex trafficking and “would have had nothing to do with him, if he had known.”

== Selected publications ==
Kosslyn has published over 350 scientific papers and written or co-authored 16 books and edited or co-edited 14 books, including the following:

=== Selected books ===
- Kosslyn, Stephen M. (1980). Image and mind. Cambridge, Massachusetts: Harvard University Press. ISBN 978-0-674-44366-2.
- Kosslyn, Stephen M. (1983). Ghosts in the mind's machine: Creating and using images in the brain. New York: W. W. Norton. ISBN 978-0-393-95257-5.
- Kosslyn, Stephen M. (1994). Elements of graph design. New York: W. H. Freeman. ISBN 978-0-7167-2362-2.
- Kosslyn, Stephen M. (1994). Image and brain: The resolution of the imagery debate. Cambridge, Massachusetts: The MIT Press. ISBN 978-0-262-277488. (doi:10.7551/mitpress/3653.003.0002)
- Kosslyn, Stephen M.; Koenig, Olivier (1995). Wet mind: The new cognitive neuroscience. New York: Free Press. ISBN 978-0-02-874085-0.
- Kosslyn, Stephen M.; Rosenberg, Robin S. (2001). Psychology: The brain, the person, the world. New York: Allyn and Bacon. ISBN 978-0-205-27465-9.
- Kosslyn, Stephen M.; Thompson, William L.; Ganis, Giorgio (2006), The case for mental imagery. New York: Oxford University Press. ISBN 978-0-19-517908-8. (doi:10.1093/acprof:oso/9780195179088.003.0006)
- Kosslyn, Stephen M. (2006). Graph design for the eye and mind. New York: Oxford University Press. ISBN 978-0-19-531184-6.
- Smith, Edward E.; Kosslyn, Stephen M., eds. (2007). Cognitive psychology: Mind and brain. Upper Saddle River, N.J: Pearson/Prentice Hall. ISBN 978-013-182508-6.
- Kosslyn, Stephen M. (2007). Clear and to the point: 8 psychological principles for compelling PowerPoint presentations. New York: Oxford University Press. ISBN 978-0-19532069-5.
- Kosslyn, Stephen M.; Rosenberg, Robin S. (2010). Psychology in context. New York: Allyn & Bacon. ISBN 9780205456147. (3rd ed.)
- Kosslyn, Stephen M. (2010). Better PowerPoint: Quick fixes based on how your audience thinks. New York: Oxford University Press. ISBN 978-0-19-537675-3.
- Kosslyn, Stephen M.; Miller, G. Wayne (2013). Top brain, bottom brain: Surprising insights into how you think. Riverside: Simon & Schuster. ISBN 978-1-4516-4510-1.
- Rosenberg, Robin, S.; Kosslyn, Stephen M. (2014). Abnormal psychology (2nd ed.). New York: Worth Publishing. ISBN 1429242167.
- Kosslyn, Stephen M.; Nelson, Ben, eds. (2017). Building the intentional university: Minerva and the future of higher education. Cambridge, Massachusetts: The MIT Press. ISBN 978-0-262-03715-0.
- Kosslyn, Stephen M. (2020). Active learning online: Five principles that make online courses come alive. Boston, Massachusetts: Alinea Learning. ISBN 978-1735810706.
- Kosslyn, Stephen M. (2023). Active learning with AI: A practical guide. Boston Massachusetts: Alinea Learning. ISBN 979-8989214006.
- Kosslyn, Stephen M. (2024). Learning to flourish in the age of AI. New York: Routledge. ISBN 978-1-032-68665-3.
