= Judith McKenna =

English businesswoman (born 1966)

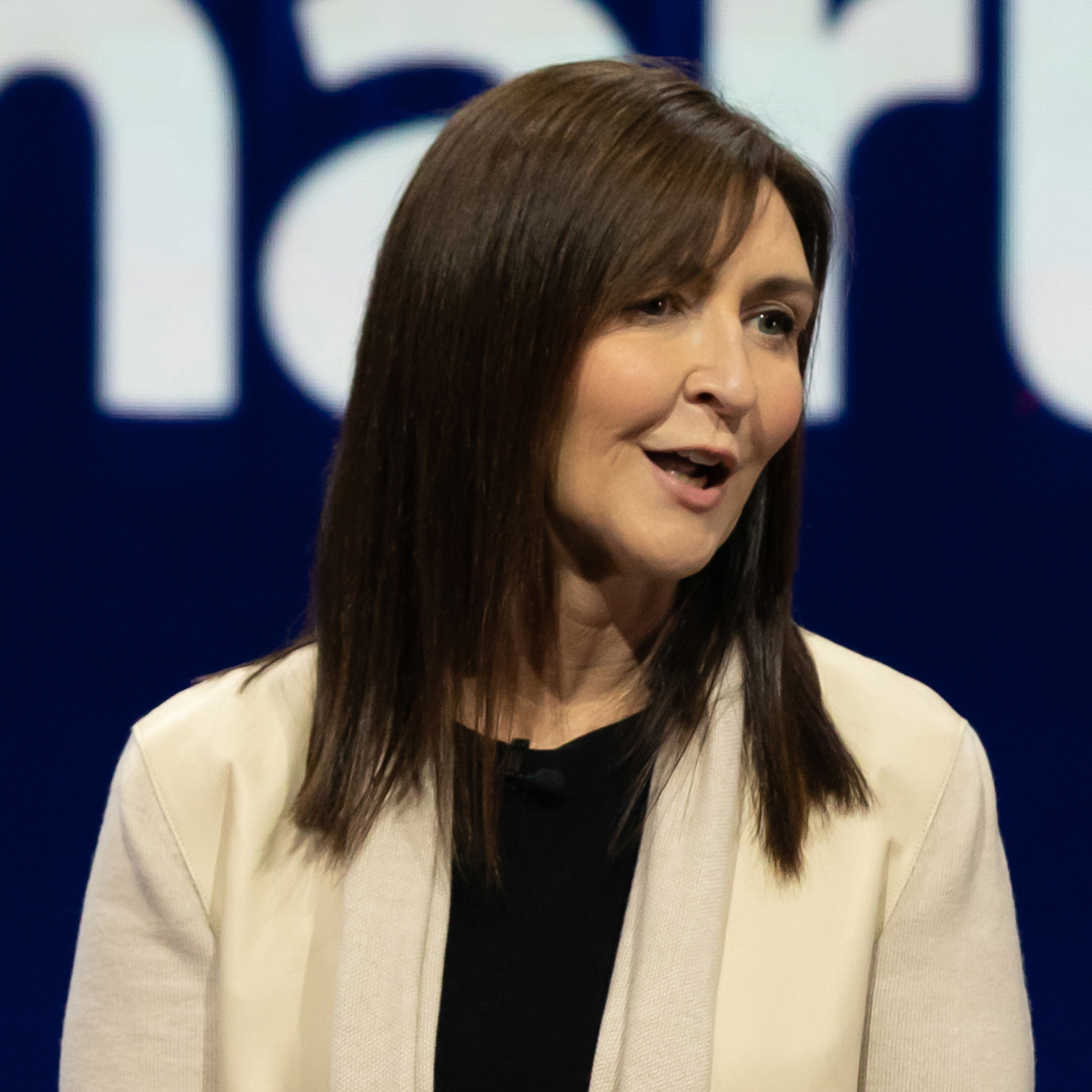
- Born: 14 May 1966 (age 60); Middlesbrough, England
- Education: University of Hull
- Occupation: Businesswoman
- Title: CEO, Walmart International
- Term: 2018–
- Predecessor: David Cheesewright
- Spouse: Phil Dutton
- Children: 2

Judith McKenna (born 14 May 1966) is an English businesswoman. She was CEO of Walmart's international division until 2023. Previously, she held leadership roles within Walmart's US division and Asda, a subsidiary of Walmart International.

== Early life ==
McKenna was born in Middlesbrough, England, on 14 May 1966. She was educated at a local comprehensive school, then earned a law degree at University of Hull. She qualified as a chartered accountant with KPMG.

== Career ==
McKenna started her career with KPMG, followed by Carlsberg Tetley and Allied Domecq, and joined Asda in 1996. McKenna became chief financial officer of Asda in 2001, a position she held until she was promoted to chief operating officer in July 2011.

At Asda, McKenna worked with David Cheesewright, whom she would later succeed at Walmart International. McKenna moved to the U.S. to lead strategy and development for Walmart International in 2014. The following year, she became chief operating officer for Walmart U.S. As COO, McKenna and Walmart U.S. president CEO Greg Foran led a $2 billion investment in higher wages, training, and technology. McKenna undertook initiatives to improve working conditions for associates, including efforts to clean stores, relax the dress code, and reinstituting Walmart Radio. She also developed training academies for associates, which includes digital learning tools and ongoing education opportunities. McKenna said more than 500,000 associates went through the academy program in 2018. She also brought features to Walmart U.S. that were present at Asda, including online ordering and in-store pickup, including grocery pickup.

McKenna became president and CEO of Walmart International in February 2018, where she was responsible for the strategy and operations for more than 5,100 stores in 19 countries, including Mexico, Canada, China, and India. As head of Walmart International, McKenna reshaped the portfolio with the sale of operations in Japan, Argentina, Brazil, and the United Kingdom, moves she said were made to promote the long-term health of Walmart International and the businesses sold. She has worked to expand the role of e-commerce in Walmart's businesses, including overseeing the $16 billion acquisition of 77 percent of Flipkart, the largest online retailer in India.

McKenna was first named to Fortune's list of 50 Most Powerful Women in 2015. As of 2022, McKenna ranked no. 14 on the list.

In August 2023, McKenna had retired from Walmart International.

== Personal life ==
McKenna met her husband, Phil Dutton, former finance director of Punch Taverns, when both worked at Asda. They have two children.
