= Jamjar Investments =

British venture capital fund

JamJar Investments
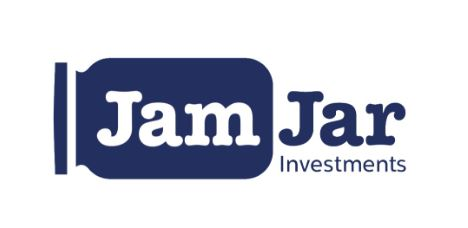
- Industry: Venture Capital
- Founded: 2012; 14 years ago
- Founders: Richard Reed, Adam Balon, Jon Wright, Katie Marrache (née Leviten)
- Headquarters: London, United Kingdom
- Website: www.jamjarinvestments.com

JamJar Investments is British venture capital investment fund, headquartered in London. JamJar Investments provides investment to early-stage companies in the consumer technology and FMCG sectors.

== Investment Focus ==
JamJar look to 'love, help & invest in early-stage consumer brands' Their focus on consumer brands is born from the JamJar founders' founding/working at Innocent Drinks.

== History ==
JamJar was founded in 2012 by Richard Reed, Jon Wright, Adam Balon, and Katie Marraché (née Leviten). Reed, Wright, and Balon had previously founded FMCG smoothie brand Innocent Drinks, which was sold to Coca-Cola in 2013 for north of $700m.

Previous investments include Runna, Wild,Farewill, Graze, Deliveroo, Tails.com, Babylon Health, Propercorn, Popchips and Simba Sleep.

In May 2017 Katie Marrache was announced Europe's youngest female VC partner. In April 2022, JamJar announced a new £100m fund.
