= Tom Teichman =

Thomas Teichman is a venture capitalist who is co-founder of The Garage Soho, London and chairman of SPARK Ventures. He was an investor in lastminute.com, Made.com, Mergermarket, notonthehighstreet.com, MAID, ARC and Argonaut Games, Kobalt Music, System C Healthcare and Moshi Monsters.

Previously, he was chairman of Simba Sleep from foundation to 2018.
