= Minerva University =

Private university in California, United States

- Seal of Minerva University
- Former name: Minerva Schools at Keck Graduate Institute
- Motto: Sapientia Critica
- Motto in English: Critical Wisdom
- Type: Private university
- Established: 2012; 14 years ago
- Founder: Ben Nelson
- Accreditation: WASC Senior College and University Commission
- President: Mike Magee
- Provost: Patrice McMahon
- Total staff: 144
- Undergraduates: 637
- Postgraduates: 12
- Location: 14 Mint Plaza, San Francisco, California, United States
- Campus: Urban international
- Website: www.minerva.edu

Minerva University is a private residential university headquartered in San Francisco, California. It was established in 2012 by Ben Nelson and opened in 2014 as Minerva Schools at Keck Graduate Institute, becoming Minerva University in 2021. A portion of classes are conducted remotely. Undergraduate students live together in residences in different cities each year, beginning in San Francisco and returning there for graduation. As of August 2026, they live in Tokyo for their sophomore year, Buenos Aires for their junior year, and Berlin for their senior year.

== History ==
=== Minerva Project ===
In April 2012, Minerva Project received US$25,000,000 in venture funding from Benchmark Capital to create an undergraduate program. In March 2013, Stephen Kosslyn was hired as founding Dean, having previously served as Director of the Center for Advanced Study in the Behavioral Sciences at Stanford University and Dean of Social Sciences at Harvard University. Kosslyn was responsible for hiring the heads of the four colleges in the School of Arts & Science and overseeing the development of Minerva's seminar-based curriculum, before leaving in 2018.

=== Minerva Schools at Keck Graduate Institute ===
In July 2013, Minerva Project partnered with the Keck Graduate Institute to officially launch the Minerva Schools at Keck Graduate Institute.

Minerva Schools launched with five undergraduate programs: Bachelor of Arts in Arts and Humanities, Bachelor of Science in Business, Bachelor of Science in Computational Sciences, Bachelor of Science in Natural Sciences, and Bachelor of Science in Social Sciences. The first class of students was admitted in 2014, with one-time free tuition for four years and a gap year after freshman year. Minerva offered places to 69 students out of 2,464 applications, and 29 students matriculated. This resulted in a 2.8% acceptance rate and a 42% yield. The second class consisted of 113 students.

In 2016, Minerva expanded into postgraduate education by offering a Master of Science in Decision Analysis. In 2018, the Hong Kong University of Science and Technology partnered with Minerva to permit its students to take Minerva's cross-disciplinary Cornerstone Courses.

=== Minerva University ===
The Minerva Institute for Research and Scholarship was independently accredited by the Western Association of Schools and Colleges in 2021, becoming Minerva University. Mike Magee became President in 2022. In early 2023, the university received a $20 million donation from Reed Hastings, co-CEO of Netflix and a former president of the California State Board of Education, who had previously donated funds for scholarships; Hastings has pledged a total donation of $100 million over 10 years. Minerva has also received $50 million in support from the Nippon Foundation.

== Academics ==
As of January 2025, Minerva had 637 undergraduates and 12 graduate students, compared to 603 and 53 respectively in fall 2023. In 2020, it was ranked the most selective university in the developed world, with an acceptance rate of 2%; with an acceptance rate below 4% in 2024, in 2025 it was ranked the third most selective university in the United States by Niche.com. Enrollment is 85% from outside the country; Minerva does not accept Pell Grants.

Courses are conducted online and capped at 20 students. Minerva emphasizes active learning, applying a 1972 study that shows that memory is enhanced by "deep" cognitive tasks such as working with materials, applying it, and arguing about it rather than rote memorization. Classes begin with a short quiz and end with a second quiz; this is claimed to increase retention. There are no final exams; students are graded on their engagement and the quality of their thought in discussions. They initially take four "Cornerstone Courses", including Empirical Analyses, Complex Systems, and Multimodal Communications, which introduce "Habits of Mind" and "Foundational Concepts" that cut across the sciences and humanities. Minerva encourages students to use massive open online courses to learn what is typically taught in first-year courses. In response to the COVID-19 pandemic, the university offered a Visiting Scholars year in 2020–21 under which students who had been accepted into a leading college or university and were unable to fulfill residential requirements could take the Cornerstone Courses.

Minerva emphasizes a mission to "solve complex global problems" and "improve the human condition" through education and an approach of taking students out of their "comfort zone". Part of earning a Minerva degree is "global immersion": class cohorts move to a different international city each year. After spending freshman year in the San Francisco Tenderloin neighborhood, as of 2025, they live in the Minato ward of Tokyo for their sophomore year, in the Palermo section of Buenos Aires for their junior year, and in Berlin for their senior year; the university has formerly had classes spend semesters in Taipei, Hyderabad, London, and Seoul. Part of the curriculum is "location-based", and while living in the Tenderloin, students are expected to do volunteer work. In 2022, Minerva students made a documentary about the neighborhood titled Left on Turk.

Faculty are timed to prevent lecturing for more than five minutes. They are trained to use Minerva's proprietary learning platform, the Minerva Forum, which color-codes students based on participation. The university does not sponsor research, but faculty retain intellectual property rights to research they publish.

== Facilities ==
Minerva University does not have classrooms, a library, or an athletics program. Its offices are in San Francisco, where it rents several floors in a building on Turk Street in the Tenderloin neighborhood as a freshman dormitory, and accommodation in Nob Hill for graduation. Until 2019, the freshman dorm was on Market Street; the university chose to move to a lower-income neighborhood. Students are similarly accommodated in rented dormitory facilities in the other cities where they study. In December 2025, the university announced that the freshman residence hall would move north to 2550 Van Ness Avenue effective spring term 2026.

== Notable alumni ==
- Jade Bowler, British YouTuber known as Unjaded Jade; attended Minerva 2019–23.

== See also ==
- Levels-of-processing effect
- London Interdisciplinary School
