= Jerusalem Center for the Visual Arts =

International artists-in-residence programme in Jerusalem

The Jerusalem Center for the Visual Arts (JCVA) is an international artists-in-residence program that hosts artists and curators in Israel.

JCVA promotes cross-cultural dialogue between visiting artists and curators and their Israeli counterparts. It provides a platform for interaction with local artists, curators and art academies, as well as links to museums and general audiences. Visiting artists are invited to work, explore, inspire and be inspired by interactions with people and places. During their residency, the JCVA provides exposure of the artists and curators to the local public by organizing from time to time, exhibitions, screenings and lectures about their oeuvre.

== History ==
Until 2004, resident artists stayed at the Mount Zion Artists' Residence, in a historic building known as the Rose House on Mount Zion. Today participants are hosted at the Mishkenot Sha'ananim Cultural Center & Guest House in Yemin Moshe. and in Tel Aviv. Over the years, JCVA has collaborated with the Tel Aviv Museum of Art, Herzliya Museum of Art, the Israeli Center for Digital Art in Holon, the Center for Contemporary Art, Bezalel Academy of Art and Design and Beit Berl College's HaMidrasha – Faculty of the Arts.

== JCVA residency ==
The JCVA residency provides an opportunity for interaction with the local art community, museums and audiences. The program is designed specially for each guest by JCVA's art director. The residency is by invitation only. The program, established in 1987 by philanthropist Francis K. Lloyd, was directed in its early years by curator Yona Fischer. Since 2002, Nirith Nelson has served as art director.

Past participants in the program include Sophie Calle, Daniel Buren, Haim Steinbach, Guenther Uecker, Krzysztof Wodiczko (2004), Monika Sosnowska (2008), Wilhelm Sasnal (2009), Raqs Media Collective (2011), Joe Kubert (2011) and Harun Farocki (2012).

During her residency in 2002, Yael Bartana created her Kings of the Hill video, later purchased for the permanent collection of the Tate Modern in London and also for the collection of the Museum of Modern Art in NY.

During her residency in 2007, Anila Rubiku, who often works with local embroiderers on her complex Urban Pornitecture, was introduced to a group of traditional Ethiopian Jewish craftswomen. Their embroidery was incorporated in Rubiku's solo exhibition "The 16 Ways" at the Braverman Gallery in Tel Aviv in 2008.

Monika Sosnowska's work, “Stairway” 2010, was created in the wake of her residency in Tel Aviv in 2008. It was exhibited two years later at the Herzliya Museum for Contemporary Art.

In 2012, Harun Farocki and Antje Ehmann conducted a workshop, “Labour in a Single Shot,” at HaMidrasha School of Art as part of a 15-city project in which students were asked to present 2-minute films on the subject of labour. The results were presented at the Tel Aviv Museum along with some of Farocki's most important works, which were exhibited in Israel for the first time.

== See also ==
- Visual arts in Israel
