= Nathan Nelson (biochemist) =

Israeli biochemist

- נתן נלסון
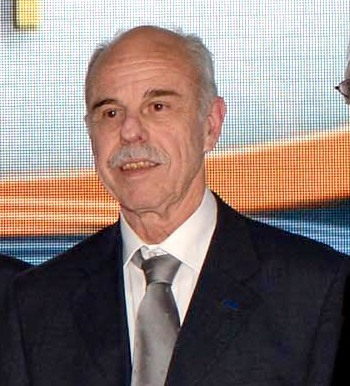
- Occupations: Biochemist, molecular biologist

Nathan Nelson (Hebrew: נתן נלסון; born 1938) is an Israeli biochemist and molecular biologist who was awarded the 2013 Israel Prize in Life Sciences. As of January 2012, he has published more than 240 scientific papers which were cited over 15,000 times.

== Early and personal life ==
Nathan Nelson was born in Avihayil, Israel in 1938. His father Moshe, who in 1918 immigrated to Israel as a soldier in the Jewish Legion, was a pioneer who co-founded Ramat Gan and the villages of Gan Haim and Avihayil. The family of Nathan's mother, Genia, was among the first settlers in Ramat Gan.

Nelson served as a paratrooper in the Israel Defense Forces from 1957 to 1959. Immediately after the Army, he became a kibbutz member in Gevim. When his father became sick, Nelson left Gevim to take care of their farm in Avihayil, raising cattle and sheep but mainly cultivating citrus trees. Unbeknownst to most, Nelson was also an avid surfer.

In 1961, Nelson's former elementary and high school teacher, Professor Elazar Kochva, persuaded him to leave the farm to study at the newly established Tel Aviv University. While studying there, he married his classmate Hannah, who became instrumental in managing his laboratory. Together, they have three children, Lee-Bath Nelson (High Tech Executive and VC), Nirith Nelson (Curator and Art Director), and Ben Nelson (Founder of The Minerva Project).

== Professional career ==
Nathan Nelson acquired three degrees at Tel Aviv University, including a Ph.D. under Professor J. Neuman's supervision.

Nelson did a post-doctoral fellowship with Professor Efraim Racker at Cornell from 1970 to 1972, after which he joined the newly opened Department of Biology at the Technion in Haifa. In 1980, he became a full professor.

During this period he spent a sabbatical year at University of Basel's Biozentrum with Professor Gottfried Schatz and at Cornell University with Professor Efraim Racker.

In 1985, Nelson was offered a position by Professor Ron Kaback at the Roche Institute of Molecular Biology, a basic science research center in which Nelson not only continued studies in his subject matter but also had a chance to explore new fields due to plentiful funding.

In 1995, he returned to Tel Aviv University and established his lab in the Biochemistry Department. In addition to his research and teaching, he was instrumental in starting the Daniella Rich Institute for Structural Biology on a very small budget. Nelson served as its director from 2005–2011.

Nelson was a member of the Board of Governors and a member of the Executive Council of Tel Aviv University; served as a Vice Chairman of the International Institute of Molecular and Cell Biology in Warsaw founded by UNESCO, and President of the Israel Society for Biochemistry.

However, his main interest always was and remains his research, which he continues to perform 7 days a week mainly on the lab bench.

== Awards and honors ==
Nathan Nelson's work has earned many awards, including:

- The Humboldt Award
- EMBO membership
- Honorary Professorship at Sichuan University
- Honorary Doctorate from University of Bologna
- Ilanit-Katzir prize of the Federation of Israel Societies of Experimental Biology (FISEB)
- 2013 Israel Prize for Life Sciences.

In 2011, he was awarded a 5-year Advanced Grant from European Research Council (ERC), designed to allow exceptional established research leaders to pursue ground-breaking projects that open new directions in any domain. The research focuses on harnessing oxygenic photosynthesis in cyanobacteria for sustainable energy production.

== Research ==
Nathan Nelson's research encompasses many topics involving membrane proteins and membrane protein complexes, among them: V-ATPase, neurotransmitter transporters, metal-ion transporters and complexes involved in the process of photosynthesis.

=== V-ATPase ===
In most living creatures, V-ATPase is a necessary component for life but Nelson discovered that yeast can overcome the constraints of non-function V-ATPase when living in high acidity. This finding opened the door for research of the proteins comprising this complex and the genes coding for them, many of which were discovered in his lab. The structure of one sub-unit was solved by x-ray crystallography in Nelson's group as well.

=== Neurotransmitter transporters ===
Neurotransmitter transporters are proteins in the neuronal cell membranes. Nelson took part in the discovery of the first gene for the GABA transporter, which is a neurotransmitter but also an amino acid. Therefore, the GAT1 gene is the first gene discovered for an amino acid transporter as well. Subsequently, genes for other transporters were discovered and characterized in his lab.

=== Metal-ion transporters ===
Nelson's research of the metal-ion transporters in yeast explained the mechanism of action of the resistance and sensitivity towards mycobacteria in mice that causes leprosy and tuberculosis in human. It was known that a defect in the homologous gene in Drosophila causes loss of taste and he found that it can be corrected by the addition of manganese or iron to their diet.

=== Photosynthesis ===
In the subject of Photosynthesis, Nelson has had several major discoveries. However, his main contribution is in supervising the work that culminated in solving the crystal structure of plant PSI by his students Adam Ben-Shem and later Alexey Amunts. They showed that the complex is composed of 18 proteins having altogether 46 transmembrane helices. In addition, the complex contains over 170 chlorophyll pigments and nearly 30 carotenoids that capture light as well but also serve as a protective agent. Plant PSI is among the most intricate membrane complexes whose structures were solved by x-ray crystallography to date. Nelson found out that when the micrometer-sized dry crystals are illuminated by a laser in a medium without oxygen, they generate a potential of over 10V.
