= Ecosa Group =

Australian mattress company

- Type: Private limited
- Industry: Mattresses
- Founded: 2015
- Founder: Ringo Chan
- Headquarters: Melbourne, Australia
- Areas served: AU, NZ, HK, US, CA
- Products: Bed-in-a-box
- Website: ecosa.com.au

Ecosa Group is an Australian bed-in-a-box company specializing in mattresses.

== History ==
Ecosa was founded in 2015 in Melbourne by Ringo Chan.

Ecosa Group expanded into New Zealand in May 2016 and to Hong Kong in September the same year. By December 2017, the company had landed in its fourth location, the United States. The company entered the Canadian market in 2019.

In January 2018, the company started producing Ecosa pillow that included a contour and adjustable height. By November previous year, they had reached $30 million in sales.

Ecosa donated around 500 mattresses to The Salvation Army.

The company has been featured in mainstream media sources like news.com.au and The New Zealand Herald among others.

== Controversy ==
The Koala Mattress manufacturer accused Ecosa of stealing their idea of placing a wine glass on the mattress and then jumping on it, the glass not spilling or even moving demonstrating the flexibility and shape memory of the mattress. Both companies had released their own versions of similar videos. Ecosa founder responded that they had developed the test before, pointing out that others had also used the water glass test before either of them, and therefore the idea was not intellectual property. Ecosa's wine glass test video had 3.04 million views as of March 2016. The two founders have presented counter arguments over the type of "zero disturbance" mattresses they create. Chan remarked that Koala had not invented the K-4 foams.

== See also ==
- Casper Sleep
- Simba Sleep
