= Tony's Chocolonely =

Dutch chocolate brand

Tony's Chocolonely Nederland B.V.
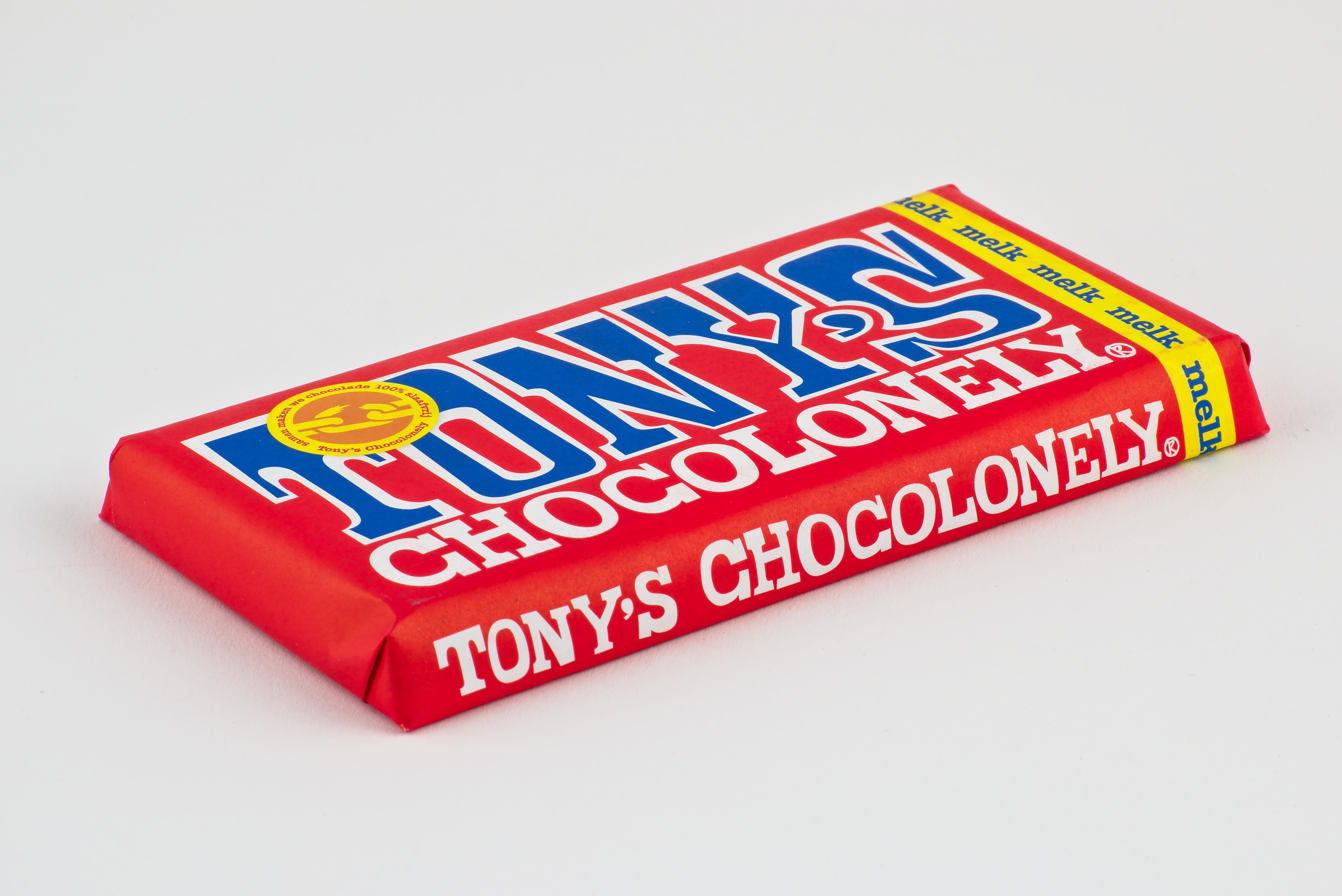
- Tony's Chocolonely milk chocolate bar
- Type: Besloten vennootschap
- Industry: Confectionery
- Founded: Amsterdam, Netherlands; 29 November 2005; 20 years ago
- Founder: Teun van de Keuken
- Headquarters: Amsterdam, Netherlands
- Key people: Douglas Lamont (CEO)
- Products: Chocolate bars
- Owner: Verlinvest 55.9%; Genuine Chocolate 17.9%; Jamjar Investments 4.9%
- Website: tonyschocolonely.com

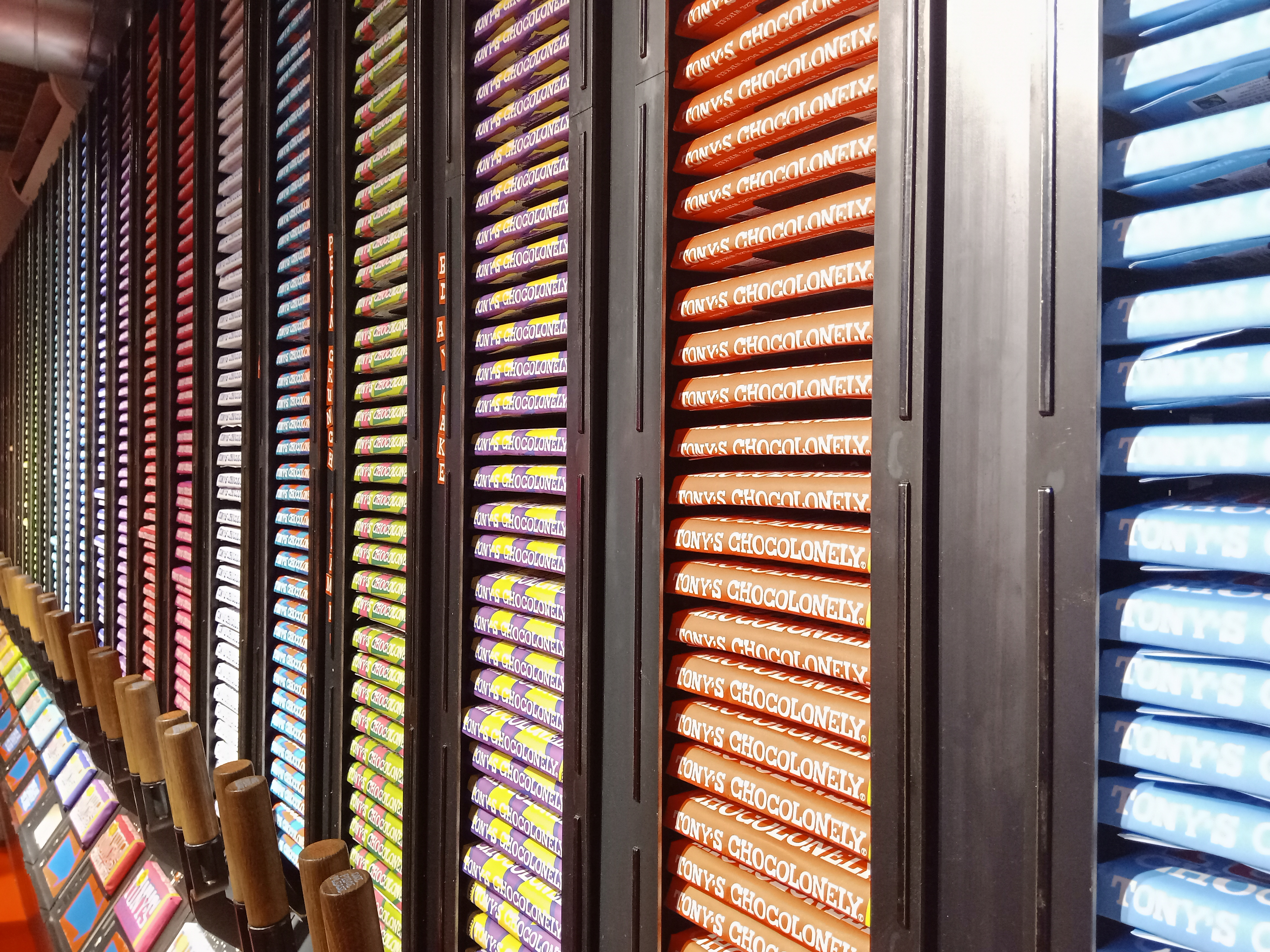
Bars in Tony's Chocolonely shop in Amsterdam

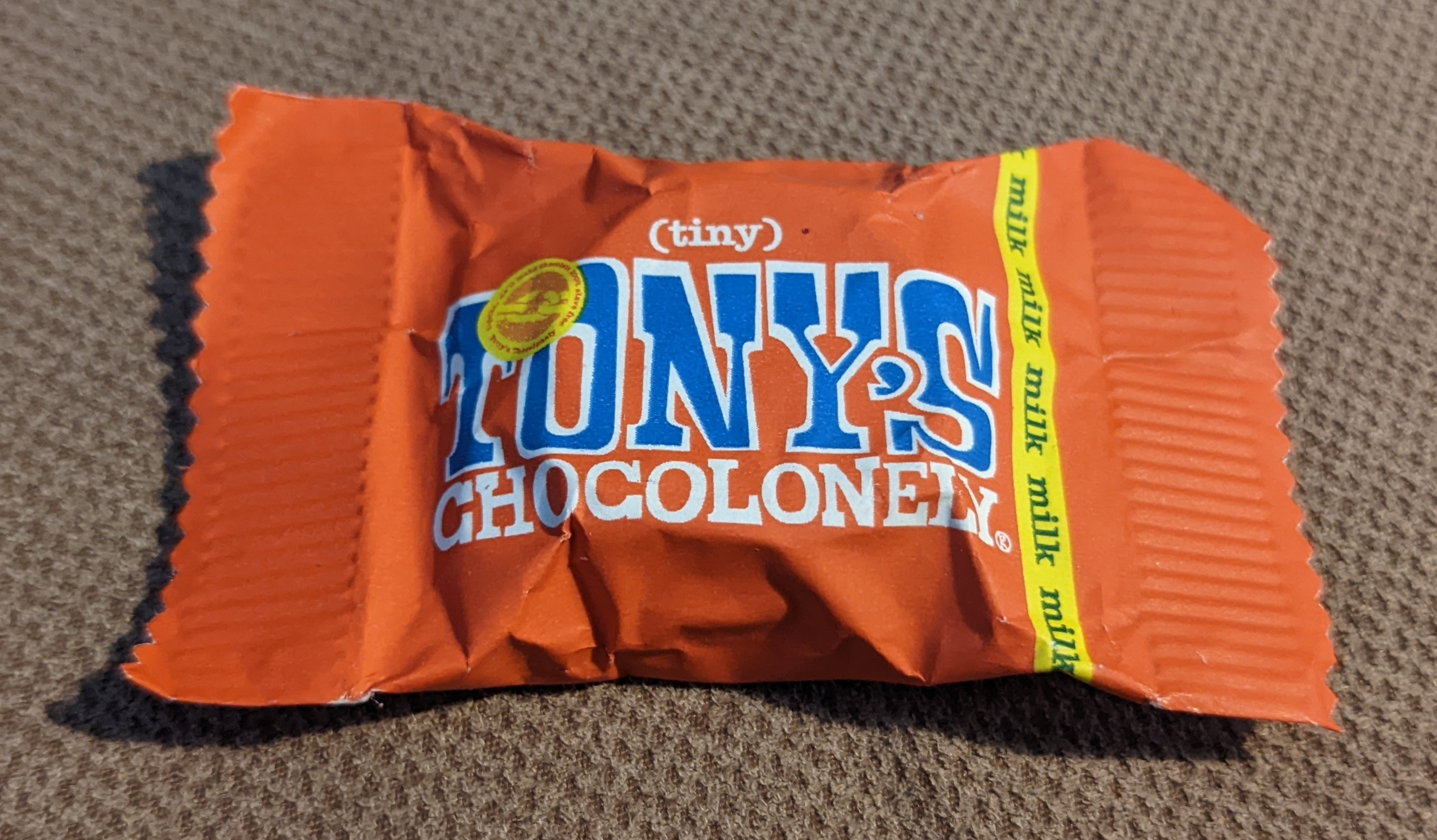
Tony's Chocolonely milk Tiny

Tony's Chocolonely, often shortened to Tony's, is a Dutch chocolate manufacturer and seller created in 2005 by television producer and journalist Teun van de Keuken as a protest against child exploitation and slavery in the chocolate industry. Tony's is headquartered in Amsterdam and is known for its advocacy. The company's market share in the Netherlands was 18 percent in 2018.

== History ==
In 2003, after discovering that the majority of chocolate produced at the time had links to human exploitation, Teun van de Keuken began producing programs about the horrors of the commercial cocoa industry on his show Keuringsdienst van Waarde. Furthermore, he submitted a request that people be prosecuted for knowingly purchasing an illegally manufactured product, which prosecutors declined to do.

After three years of unsuccessful attempts to change the industry through investigative efforts, Van de Keuken decided to start producing chocolate bars himself. The brand was called "Tony's Chocolonely" with "Tony" (= Teun) and "Chocolonely" in reference to van de Keuken feeling as if he was the only person in the industry who was interested in eradicating slavery. Van de Keuken sold 20,000 bars in two days.

In 2007, after Tony's was sued by a Dutch importer of Swiss chocolates, a court in Amsterdam ruled that there was sufficient evidence that Tony's products were manufactured without the help of slaves. In the same year, the Dutch Media Authority (Commissariaat voor de Media) found that the excessive advertising Tony's Chocolonely received in seven episodes of Keuringsdienst van Waarde generated "more than normal profits" for the company, and fined the broadcaster of the show €20,000.

When a hazelnut milk chocolate bar was added to the lineup in 2010, Dutch TV show Een Vandaag reported that 9-year-old children participated in the Turkish hazelnut harvest. The company responded by immediately switching to a local hazelnut supplier from the Netherlands. The same year, the market share of the brand exceeded 4.5 percent in the Netherlands.

In 2011, Henk Jan Beltman became a majority shareholder and moved the company to a new location near Westergasfabriek.

Tony's cocoa mass has been fully traceable since 2013, and its cocoa butter since 2016.

With production steadily increasing, the company decided in 2015 to expand their business to the United States, opening their first international office in Portland, Oregon. They closed their Portland office in 2020 and moved to their current US headquarters in New York City.

By the end of 2018, in addition to its home country of The Netherlands, Tony's Chocolonely was also on sale in Belgium, Denmark, Finland, Germany, Sweden, and the United States. In the Netherlands its market share was 19% in 2018, with which it surpassed multinationals Verkade, Mars and Nestlé.

In 2019, Tony’s Chocolonely launched the Open Chain initiative, that encouraged other chocolate manufacturers to embrace transparent cocoa sourcing, and that is "100% slave free."

In 2019, Tony's launched their chocolate bars in the United Kingdom, with Sainsbury's, Waitrose, Ocado, Oxfam, and Whole Foods being some of the first stores to stock their products.

The chocolate bar was made available in Ireland from 2019 in a limited capacity. As of 2020, it has become more widely available in leading food stores such as SuperValu.

In 2020, Belgian investment firm Verlinvest and British investment fund Jamjar investments invested 43.1% and 4.1% respectively. In 2023 they increased their investments to 55.9% and 4.9%.

In 2021, the company received backlash after the American organization Slave Free Chocolate removed Tony's from their list of ethical chocolate companies. While there were no confirmed instances of child labor within Tony's supply chain, their collaboration with another chocolate manufacturer, Barry Callebaut, resulted in Tony's removal from the list due to issues of child labor within Barry Callebaut's supply chain.

In February 2024, Tony’s had launched four new temporary wrappers in Germany and Austria inspired by famous chocolate brands, including Milka, as an advertising campaign and to raise awareness around the use of child labour by major suppliers in the cocoa industry. After being sued by Milka manufacturer Mondelez International, it was banned from selling chocolate "using the colour purple" in Germany.

In September 2024, Feastables joined Tony's Open Chain, which tracks whether cocoa beans are ethically sourced, as a partner. Other such companies that have joined Tony’s Open Chain include Ben & Jerry’s, Aldi, and Waitrose, among others.

== Products ==
The number of available bar flavors varies by country and distribution channel. For example, over a dozen flavors are available in the Netherlands. The chocolate bars themselves are unevenly divided, symbolizing the unequal distribution of incomes in the chocolate industry.

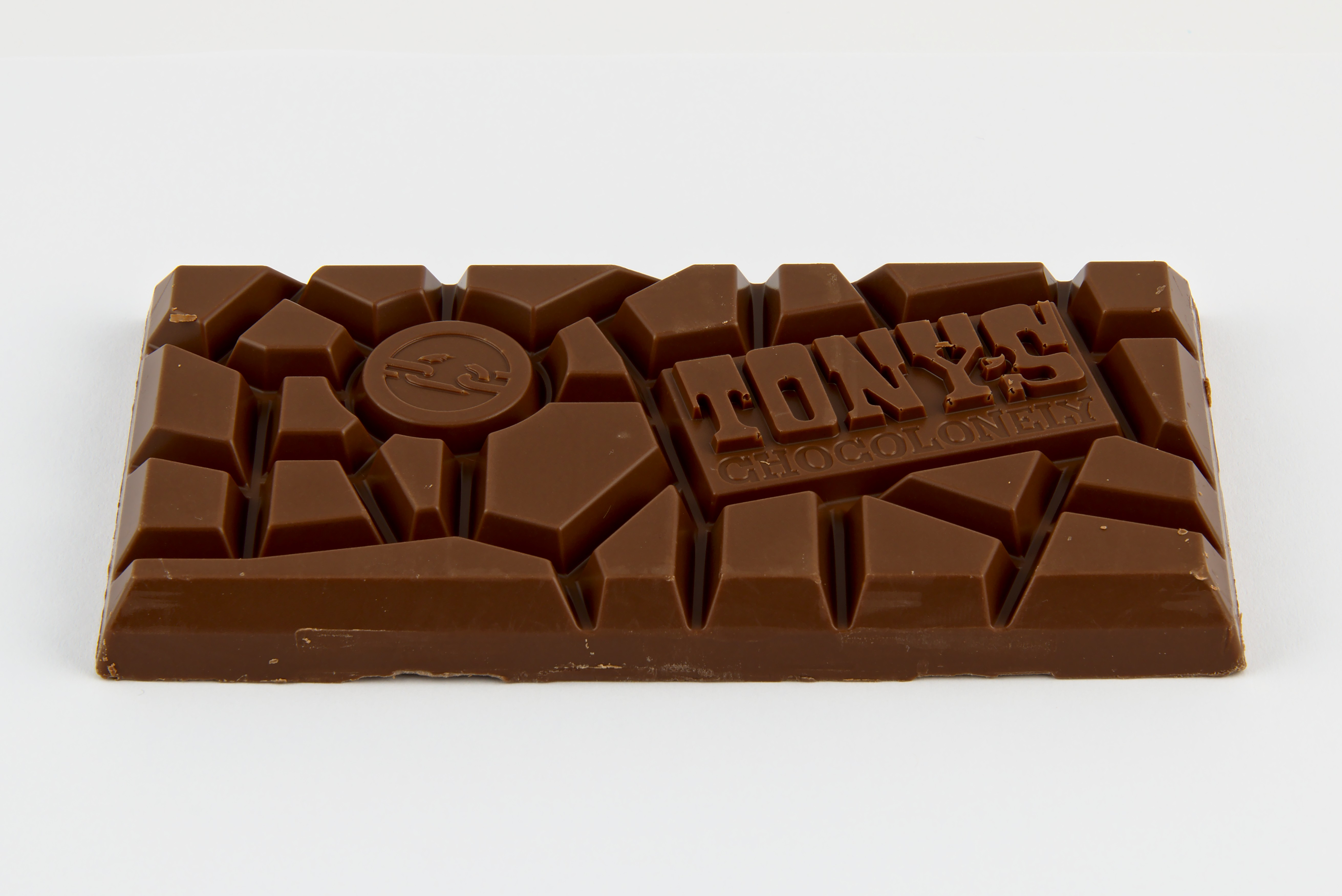
An unwrapped Tony's Chocolonely milk chocolate bar. As explained in the FAQs on their website, the bars’ unevenly divided sections are meant to serve as a reminder of the unequal distribution of profits within the chocolate industry.

Below are the chocolate bar flavors available in the United States in order of introduction. The percentages indicate how much of each chocolate bar (by weight) is cocoa-derived ingredients, including cocoa solids and cocoa butter.

- Milk chocolate 32%
- Extra dark chocolate 70%
- Milk chocolate caramel sea salt 32%
- Dark almond sea salt 51%
- Dark milk pretzel toffee 42%
- Dark pecan coconut 51%
- Milk hazelnut 32%
- Milk honey almond nougat 32%
- White raspberry popping candy 28%

While types of products vary in a similar fashion to flavor count, most regions have:

- Large bars (180 grams)
- Small bars (50 grams)
- Tiny Tony's (9 grams)
- Seasonal items (including holiday bars and chocolate Easter eggs)

Items unavailable outside of Europe include:

- Personalized chocolate bars
- Chocolate milk
- Chocolate letters

The company introduces three new chocolate bar flavors each year between October and December. The most popular of the three limited editions is then added to the exclusive collection, and sometimes the permanent collection. The company also produces limited edition 'relay' bars for the supermarket chain Albert Heijn, with exclusive flavors corresponding to winter and summer tastes. These flavors rotate every six months. Some bars have entered the permanent collection from there.

== Awards ==
In 2020, the company was named the most sustainable brand in the Netherlands for the third time by the Sustainable Brand Index. However, this award does not measure brands' actual sustainability but consumers' perceptions of it.

In 2022, the Thomson Reuters Foundation awarded Tony's Chocolonely the Stop Slavery Award in the category "Goods and Services Companies". This award recognizes companies and organizations who have set a high standard for eradicating slavery, illegal child labor, and human trafficking from their supply chains.

Tony's Chocolonely was ranked second on the 2023 Chocolate Scorecard, which rates chocolate companies according to their human rights and environmental credentials: traceability and transparency, living income for cocoa farmers, child labour (absence of), deforestation & climate, agroforestry, and agrochemical management.

In 2025, Tony's Chocolonely was ranked 1st on the 6th Edition Chocolate Scorecard in the medium to large companies category with an overall score of 91%.

== See also ==
- Child labour in cocoa production
- Ethical consumerism
- History of chocolate
