= Teun van de Keuken =

Dutch TV producer, novelist, and chocolate manufacturer (born 1971)

- Born: September 4, 1971 (age 54); Amsterdam, Netherlands
- Education: Barlaeus Gymnasium
- Occupations: Television and radio producer; journalist; entrepreneur
- Years active: 2005–present
- Known for: Founding Tony's Chocolonely (2005)
- Father: Johan van der Keuken
- Website: teunvandekeuken.nl

Teun van de Keuken (born September 4, 1971) is a Dutch television and radio producer, journalist and entrepreneur. He founded the chocolate company Tony's Chocolonely in 2005. He debuted in 2017 as a novelist.

== Biography ==
=== Television and investigative journalism ===
Van de Keuken was born to strongly left-wing parents (his father was documentary filmmaker Johan van der Keuken), and referred to the environment in his parents' house as a "secular Calvinism". He became known for the program Keuringsdienst van waarde, which focused on problems in food production, including slavery and child labor. Research for this show led him to focus on chocolate. He sought publicity and a verdict by the courts on slave labor by eating chocolate bars made with slave labor, and asking to be arrested as an accessory to the crime of employing child slaves. In the end he created what he called "slave-free chocolate", manufactured following fair trade conventions, under the brand Tony's Chocolonely. In 2011, 51% of the company was bought by businessman Henk Jan Beltman. In a 2016 documentary about him called Tony, Van de Keuken said that it was all to no avail, that slave labor still was part of the manufacturing chain; Beltman accepted that as a challenge to continue the struggle against slavery in the cocoa trade.

He made other investigative journalistic productions such as De slag om Brussel and De slag om Nederland, and in 2014 published a collection of articles on food, food production, and certification marks. Since 2015 he has presented De Monitor, an investigative journalism program.

=== Authorship ===
Also a columnist since the mid-2000s, he published his first novel, Goed Volk ("Good people"), in 2017. The book, partially autobiographical, deals with growing up in Amsterdam and attending public schools; the author's parents made a point of sending him to schools attended by lower-class children, where he felt like an outsider and was used as a political statement. Johan van der Keuken is not mentioned by name, though the first-person narrator is called "Teun". Vrij Nederland called the novel "semi-autobiographical" and qualified it as a coming of age novel, in which the narrator develops from being deeply ashamed of his parents and particularly his father to appreciating him as a man with good intentions.
