= Richard Reed =

British businessman

Richard Reed CBE
- Born: 13 February 1973 (age 53); Kirkheaton, West Yorkshire, England
- Education: St. John's College, Cambridge
- Occupation: Businessman
- Known for: Co-founder of Innocent Drinks and Jamjar Investments
- Awards: Commander of the Order of the British Empire (2016)
- Website: innocentdrinks.co.uk; jamjarinvestments.com

Richard John Reed, CBE (born 13 February 1973) is a British businessman, entrepreneur and public speaker. He is the co-founder of Innocent Drinks (founded in 1999), an international company producing fresh fruit smoothies and vegetable pots sold in various outlets around the world, and of Jamjar Investments (founded 2012). He pioneered "wackaging" – quirky messages on packaging – of products such as smoothies.

== Biography ==
Richard Reed was born in 1973 in Kirkheaton, West Yorkshire, and grew up in Mirfield. He attended Batley Grammar School and went on to study geography at St John's College, Cambridge (1991–94), after which he worked as an account manager in an advertising agency for four years. In 1998, with fellow Cambridge graduates Adam Balon and Jon Wright, he set up a smoothie and drinks company called Innocent Drinks, initially operating from a market stall. Reed said in an interview with The Financial Times: "After we left our jobs, we had no cash – just one month's salary each that we tried to eke out for two months. We each ran up debts of about £15,000 from overdrafts and credit cards.... It took us four years before we were back to earning £40,000 – the same salary that we had left." Their brand over the years grew to become the biggest in Europe and in 2013 was sold to Coca-Cola.

Reed is involved with various charities, and is the founder of Art Everywhere and co-founder of the Innocent Foundation and in 2012 of JamJar Investments. He also presented the BBC Three television series Be Your Own Boss.

He is the author of If I Could Tell You Just One Thing...Encounters with Remarkable People and Their Most Valuable Advice (Canongate Books, 2016, ISBN 978-1782119227), donating the author's profits from the book to five mentoring and social inclusion charities.

At the 2016 Queen's Birthday Honours, Reed was appointed a Commander of the Order of the British Empire (CBE) for services to the food industry and to charity.

Reed resides in West London.
