= Edward Fidoe =

British actor

- Born: Edward Fidoe; 10 May 1978 (age 48)

Edward Fidoe (born 10 May 1978) is a British former actor, best known for playing Eric in Central's children's television series Woof! from 1989 to 1993. As an adult he has run a theatre production company with playwright Matt Charman, worked as a consultant at McKinsey & Company and co-founded School 21 an all-through school that opened in September 2012 in Stratford, East London.
