= Seven Myths About Education =

Book by Daisy Christodoulou

- Author: Daisy Christodoulou
- Genre: Education
- Publisher: The Curriculum Centre, Routledge
- Publication date: 2013
- Pages: 133
- ISBN: 978-0-415-74681-6

Seven Myths About Education is a book about education by Daisy Christodoulou. It suggests that declarative knowledge such as facts is being neglected in modern education because of the priority given to procedural knowledge such as skills. It was first published as an e-book by The Curriculum Centre in 2013 and then in hardback and paperback by Routledge in 2014.

The seven myths are:

1. Facts prevent understanding
2. Teacher-led instruction is passive
3. The 21st century fundamentally changes everything
4. You can always just look it up
5. We should teach transferable skills
6. Projects and activities are the best way to learn
7. Teaching knowledge is indoctrination
