= UCL Arts and Sciences =

Degree offered by University College London

The UCL Arts & Sciences degree is an interdisciplinary, undergraduate degree at University College London, United Kingdom. It is part of the UCL Faculty of Arts and Humanities for administrative purposes, but it engages fully with all science, social science and humanities faculties across UCL. The degree offers a bespoke programme incorporating both arts and sciences (including social sciences) specialisms with students graduating with a Bachelors in Arts & Sciences (abbreviated "BASc"). The programme offers material from almost all UCL departments, including new modules specifically designed for the course by leading UCL academics.

== History ==
The first intake began in September 2012 with 87 students. The intake is now 120 per year and there are 400-450 students on the course in total, including international affiliate students.

== Degree ==
The course offers a choice of both a major and minor pathway from the outset with half of the degree devoted to the pathways: Cultures, Health and Environment, Sciences and Engineering, and Societies. Students are required to study a mix of arts and sciences throughout the degree programme and are also offered the opportunity to study abroad for a year. Half of their programme consists of core courses, including modules on quantitative methods, research projects, philosophy of knowledge, qualitative thinking and a language.

A language module forms a significant part of the course (one-eighth of teaching time) with students having a selection of nineteen languages. Furthermore, students are encouraged and supported to take an internship at the end of Year 2.

== Facilities ==
The Arts & Sciences Common Room is located in Malet Place, parallel to Gower Street on the main UCL campus. Otherwise students use the usual departmental facilities where they study their courses.

== Staff ==
=== Programme director ===
Carl Gombrich, ex-Programme Director, was the Principal of UCL's international preparatory certificates before being appointed Programme Director, Arts and Sciences (BASc) in September 2010, a role he held until March 2019. He has degrees in mathematics, physics and philosophy and was also an opera singer before joining UCL in 2002. He is currently learning Mandarin Chinese. He is the grandson of Ernst Gombrich, the art historian whose work he cites as the inspiration for his efforts to reach across disciplines.

Tim Jordan is the current Programme Director. He is a professor of Digital Cultures at UCL, and his research has focused on "the social and cultural meaning of digital and internet socio-technologies". He teaches on BASC0001, Approaches to Knowledge: Introduction to Interdisciplinarity, the first core module BASc students undertake, and is a module convenor for BASC0023, The Knowledge Economy, the only compulsory core module for BASc third years.

=== Academic staff ===
Working closely with the Programme Director, formerly Carl Gombrich, are the Pathway Representatives:

- Cultures - Thomas Kador and Sara Wingate-Gray.
- Health and Environment - Beth Parkin and Vincent Walsh.
- Sciences and Engineering - Brenda Parker and Professor Stephen Price.
- Societies - Elodie Douarin, Christian Spielmann and Graham Woodgate.

=== Administrative staff ===
The main administrative staff are:

- Cristy Meadows - Departmental Administrator
- Elena Méndez-Piedra Paredes - International and Affiliates Officer
- Angela Vaughn - Undergraduate Officer
- Natalie Flintoff - Placements and Vacancies Manager.

Modules are taught by a wide range of UCL staff. Notable academics include Hannah Fry from the UCL Centre for Advanced Spatial Analysis who teaches Quantitative Methods and Mark Miodownik a UCL materials scientist and broadcaster who runs the second year engineering module.

== Value of the course ==
Malcolm Grant, UCL Provost until 2013, when talking about UCL Arts and Sciences in an interview with the New York Times said that, “I've always felt it was a mistake to make students specialize at such a young age. At 15, how many people know they want to be scientists — or lawyers?”. He explains that, “This program combines the best of the British model, where you progress from year to year, with the fairly significant amount of choice you have in America.” He concludes, “If we can continue to attract the smartest students, as we have done in the first year, I think this will become the principal mode of entry into this university.”

=== Liberal arts degrees ===
UCL Arts & Sciences is similar to some liberal arts degrees which also encompass studies in mathematics, science, arts, and languages. There is a growing movement in Europe for a liberal arts education with nearly a dozen being established within the UK in the past couple of years. There are now also many more UK liberal arts degrees for example in the universities of Essex, Exeter, Winchester, Birmingham, Kent, and King's College London.

Touting the benefits of liberal arts education, David Oxtoby, president of Pomona College in California said "Narrow training that prepares you for one particular career just doesn't work any more". He believes a liberal arts degree is also good for society. "The broader benefit is preparing educated citizens, people who will take an active part in society, who will be intelligent voters, who can read a newspaper, understand the issues and be part of an educated electorate.".
