= David Cheesewright =

British businessman (born 1962)

- Education: Loughborough University
- Title: Former president and CEO, Walmart International
- Term: February 2014 – January 2018
- Successor: Judith McKenna
- Board member of: Yihaodian; Massmart; Smith School of Business

David Cheesewright (born May 1962) is the British former president and CEO of Walmart International, a division of Wal-Mart Stores, Inc. (NYSE: WMT).

== Early career ==
Cheesewright earned a bachelor's degree in sports science and mathematics from Loughborough University, England. For 12 years prior to joining Walmart, he held a range of positions with Mars Confectionery in the UK, in sales, marketing, supply chain and manufacturing.

== Walmart ==
=== Asda ===
Cheesewright joined Walmart in 1999 and held senior leadership positions with Asda Stores, Ltd. in the United Kingdom. From 1999 to 2008, Cheesewright held various leadership positions in operations, merchandising, logistics, strategy and format development at Asda, a UK supermarket acquired by Walmart in 1999.

=== Walmart Canada ===
Cheesewright served as COO of Walmart Canada from 2004-2005. In 2008, he was promoted to CEO of Walmart Canada and held that role until 2011. He drove the company's eCommerce business while introducing Walmart's supercenter format to the Canadian market.

=== Walmart EMEA ===
From 2011 to 2013, Cheesewright held the role of President and CEO for Walmart's Europe, Middle East and Africa (EMEA) and Canada region. During his tenure, Cheesewright oversaw the integration of acquisitions on three continents. Cheesewright was responsible for the integration of sub-Saharan Africa retailer Massmart Holdings Ltd., the integration of stores purchased from Zellers in Canada and continued the rollout of the supercenter format in Canada. He also oversaw Asda's integration of Netto stores in the United Kingdom and helped drive the development of Asda's online grocery service.

As CEO of Walmart International, Cheesewright was a central figure in Walmart Canada's wrongful dismissal of Gail Galea. In January 2010, Cheesewright removed Galea from her position as Vice President, General Merchandising, but failed to assign her to a comparable position. Several months later, Cheesewright terminated her employment with Walmart Canada. The Ontario Superior Court of Justice found that Cheesewright made the decision to dismiss or denigrate Galea to the point where she would resign, and that his conduct was unfair and in bad faith. Galea was awarded more than $1.6 million against Walmart Canada in compensatory, moral and punitive damages.

In January 2018, less than 2 months after the release of the judgment in the Galea case, it was announced that Cheesewright would retire at the end of the month, and be succeeded by Judith McKenna.

== Memberships and associations ==
Cheesewright was Chairman of the Board of Gazeley Holdings and of Walmart Canada Bank. He has also been a member of the Board of Directors of Walmex, IGD, ECR Europe and The Retail Council of Canada, Canada's largest retail-industry association.
