= Ben Nelson (businessman) =

American businessman

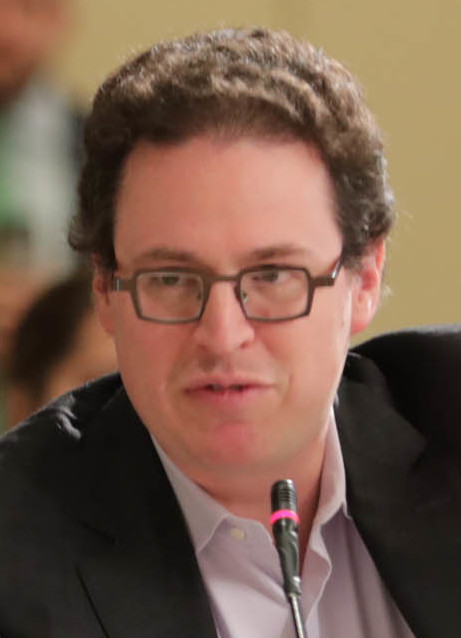
- Nelson in 2017
- Education: University of Pennsylvania (BS)
- Occupations: CEO, Minerva Project; Chancellor, Minerva University
- Board member of: Intelligence Squared, San Francisco Opera

Ben Nelson is an American businessperson who is the founder of Minerva Project and Minerva University.

== Education ==
Nelson graduated from the Wharton School at the University of Pennsylvania with a B.S. in economics with honors as a Joseph Wharton Scholar.

== Career ==
Nelson joined Snapfish in 1999. By 2002, Nelson was the CFO of Snapfish. He became CEO and president in March 2005, shortly before the acquisition of the company by Hewlett-Packard. He continued to run the company following the acquisition as a subsidiary.

In 2011, Nelson founded the for-profit Minerva Project and received a $25 million seed investment from Benchmark Capital in 2012. In 2012, Minerva Project founded Minerva University which he is chancellor of.
