= Innocent Drinks =

British beverage company, majority owned by Coca Cola

Innocent Limited
- Trade name: Innocent Drinks
- Industry: Beverage
- Founded: 1998; 28 years ago
- Founder: Richard Reed, Adam Balon and Jon Wright
- Headquarters: London, United Kingdom
- Area served: Europe
- Products: Drinks
- Owner: The Coca-Cola Company (90%)
- Website: innocentdrinks.co.uk

Innocent Limited, trading as Innocent Drinks, is a British-based company that produces smoothies and juice sold in supermarkets, coffee shops and various other outlets. The company sells more than two million smoothies per week. Innocent is over 90% owned by The Coca-Cola Company.

== History ==
Innocent Drinks was founded by three Cambridge University graduates: Richard Reed, Adam Balon and Jon Wright, then working in consulting and advertising. The three were friends at St John's College, Cambridge. In 1998, after spending six months working on smoothie recipes and £500 on fruit, the trio sold their drinks from a stall at a music festival in London. People were asked to put their empty bottles in a YES or NO bin depending on whether they thought the trio should quit their jobs to make smoothies. At the end of the festival, the YES bin was full with only 3 in NO, so they went to their work the next day and resigned. After resignation, the trio struggled to find investment, but eventually had a lucky break when Maurice Pinto, a wealthy American businessman, decided to invest £250,000. In total, it took fifteen months from the initial idea to taking the product to market.

In 2007 McDonald's began a five-year trial of using Innocent smoothies as part of their Happy Meals. Feedback from customers led McDonald's to drop the product in 2012. However, in 2015, the Chiquita Smoothie was replaced by two varieties of Innocent smoothies in the Netherlands.

Revenue for the company declined in 2009 as a result of the 2008 financial crisis, which led to an overall loss of £8.6m.

On 6 April 2009, Innocent Drinks announced on its website an agreement to sell a stake of 10–20% to The Coca-Cola Company for £30 million, with the three founders continuing to retain operational control. As a result of the takeover, Ethical Consumer magazine reduced their ethical rating for the company from 12.5/20 to 6.5/20. In April 2010, Coca-Cola increased its stake in the company to 58% from 18 for about £65 million. In February 2013 Coca-Cola increased their stake to over 90%, leaving the three founders with a small minority holding.

In June 2016, the drinks company reported a sales surge thanks to new products such as coconut water and vegetable smoothies. These new products contributed £28m to sales. Revenues reported that year were £247.4m, a 13% increase on the previous 12 months.

== Products ==
Innocent Drinks products in a supermarket

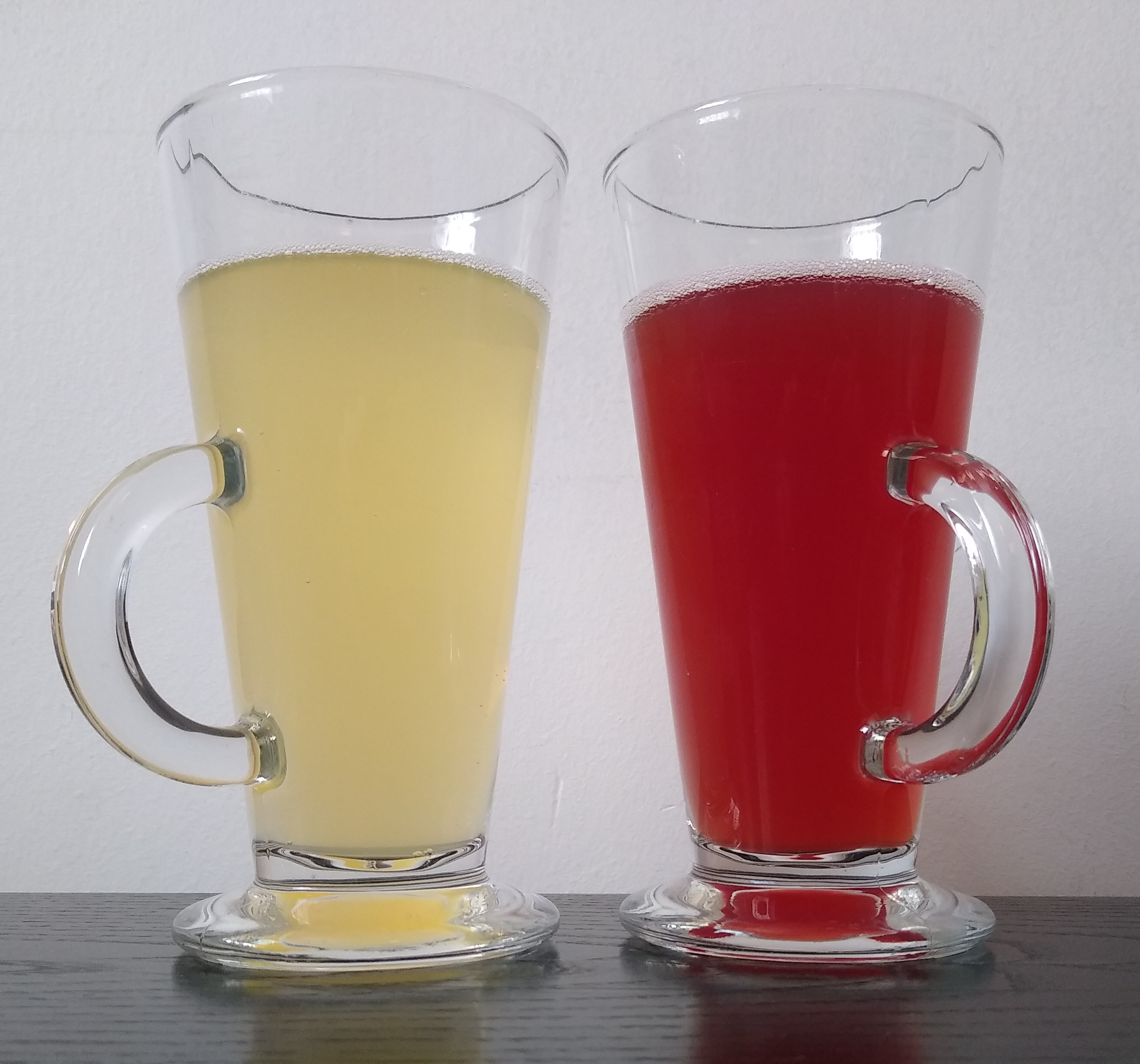
Innocent Bubbles

Smoothies are Innocent's primary product. An Innocent smoothie consists of whole crushed fruit and juices, but other ingredients such as carrots and ginger have been used in some drinks. Innocent also produces juices for kids, not-from-concentrate juice range, Innocent Bubbles; which are carbonated, and coconut water.

Innocent launched its first food product in 2008 with the Veg Pots range, further extending the line to include a range of Asian Noodle pots in 2013, before exiting the food business completely in 2015.

Innocent launched a new range in March 2014. Super Smoothies consist of a blend of fruits, veg, botanicals and crushed flax seeds, with added vitamins.

In 2015 they launched a range of cold press fruit and veg juices.

In 2018 the brand launched their first range of vegan nut and oat drinks. It includes almond, hazelnut and oat drink varieties.

=== Health claims ===
Three academic papers, produced by researchers at Oxford Brookes University and the University of Aberdeen, were commissioned by Innocent. In the first study, scientists at the Department of Biological and Medical Sciences, Oxford Brookes University, said suggestions that puréeing fruit destroys the cell wall matrix that gives fruit its structure and makes smoothies less fibrous than fruit eaten whole were not justified. "This is particularly evident when you look at a smoothie under the microscope and can see big chunks or undamaged cellular material," said lead author Professor Chris Hawes. Researchers found smoothies contained comparable fiber to that contained in whole fruit. In the study by Oxford Brookes Functional Food Centre, the strawberry and banana and mango and passion fruit Innocent smoothies were found to have a low GI value, meaning the naturally found sugars were absorbed slowly by the body, making them no more harmful than the impact of eating an apple on blood glucose levels.

=== Product recall ===
In October 2005 there were several reports of Innocent smoothies "exploding". In 2007, Innocent recalled 100,000 bottles, stating that the explosions were caused by a natural fermentation of the ingredients.

== Environmental record, advertising and controversies ==
Innocent Drinks discovered that one of their suppliers was contributing to the unsustainable water use threatening UNESCO World Heritage site Doñana National Park, one of Europe's most important wetlands.

In 2022, the Advertising Standards Authority banned an Innocent Drinks ad that claimed the company's products have a positive environmental impact. The Authority found this was untrue, since the company's use of single-use plastics for its bottles meant that over their full life-cycle, they had a negative environmental impact. Bottles sold by Innocent contain 50% recycled plastic and 50% virgin plastic which has a higher carbon footprint compared to recycled; these figures exclude the bottle caps and labels.

From 2010 to 2012, Innocent worked in partner with its supplier and Unilever to map the water footprint and the efficiency of multiple strawberry farms over three years. The project permitted them to identify ways to reduce water use through improving water efficiency and management on strawberry farms.

Innocent Drinks next worked with the University of Cordoba to trial variations of short-pulse irrigation systems, which are considered to be the most efficient irrigation systems for strawberries while remaining cost-effective for farmers to install. In 2014, they began farmer workshops to train them in best practice water management and encourage them to reduce their water use. Innocent later developed Irri-Fresa, an app that calculates optimal daily irrigation times. In 2015, participating farmers using the app saved 1.7 billion liters – cutting water use by up to 40 percent on their farms.

In October 2007 Innocent was warned by the Advertising Standards Authority for making unsubstantiated claims about the health benefits of their "superfoods" smoothies, stating that their marketing claims could not be backed up by medical science and ordering Innocent not to repeat them.

In 2007 the European Union passed a new law, which took effect from 2009, requiring companies labelling their products as "superfoods" to justify statements that their products are "superfoods", "healthy" or "good for you". Currently Innocent still uses the word "superfruit" in their marketing.

A 2008 report pointed out false claims made by the company that their product was transported solely by boat or rail to reduce greenhouse gas emissions when they were in fact trucked over hundreds of miles from the continent. Innocent's website stated that their drinks were "made in the countryside" whereas they were actually imported from the Netherlands. The company stated that the information on their website was out of date and misleading statements would be removed promptly.

Innocent's products usually come in standard plastic or Tetra Pak bottles or beverage cans instead of reusable glass containers. Innocent says that they try to reduce the amount of packaging as best as they can and use recycled plastics and FSC-certified wood for cardboard-based packages.

== Charity ==
From 2011 onwards, the company committed to give a minimum of £250,000 to the Innocent foundation in years when there is no profit made, to allow its work to continue. In 2013, the company increased this annual commitment to £950,000 per year for the next five years.

Innocent Drinks has pledged to give at least 10% of all its profits to charity every year.

The Innocent Foundation is a registered charity funded by the employees, shareholders and company of Innocent Drinks. The foundation says it has supported 67 different projects since 1998.

Innocent Drinks use the following criteria to choose which charities they support: organisations must benefit a community rather than individuals; be not-for-profit; be pursuing charitable purposes; consider taking part in The Foundation scholarship programme, which offers employees of Innocent Limited the opportunity to volunteer with partners and use their business skills to bring benefit to the organisation.

In 2015, Action Against Hunger and the Innocent Foundation partnered to help improve the treatment of malnutrition in Mali and Pakistan. The efforts include mobilising health workers to diagnose and treat children at home.

In 2003 Innocent began a project called The Big Knit. The company asks volunteers to knit small hats to put on their smoothies. For each smoothie sold Innocent stated they would donate 25p to Age UK to help older people during the cold winter months. The donations are used to provide lunches, classes, befriending services, and other support services offered by local Age UK centres. Innocent reports that 6 million hats have been knitted and they have been able to raise over £1.9 million for charities like Age UK.

Innocent provided 2 years of funding for The Trussell Trust's Holiday Clubs project, which provides meals, activities, and learning opportunities to families during school holidays, with the goal of reducing hunger and isolation.

In October 2016, Innocent foundation joined Oxfam's Emergency Response Network, a disaster relief fund for emergency support during a crisis.

== See also ==
- List of vegetarian and vegan companies
