= Eric Nelson =

Eric Nelson may refer to:

- Eric Nelson (musician) (active 2000s-), American choral conductor, clinician, and composer
- Eric G. Nelson (active 1990s-), American diplomat, ambassador of the United States to Bosnia and Herzegovina
- Eric S. Nelson (born 1968), American philosopher and Chair Professor at the Hong Kong University of Science and Technology
- Eric M. Nelson (born 1977), American historian and professor of government at Harvard University
- Eric W. Nelson (born 1970), American historian and professor of history at Missouri State University
- Eric Nelson (West Virginia politician) (born 1960), American state legislator in West Virginia
- Eric Nelson (Pennsylvania politician) (born 1968), member of the Pennsylvania House of Representatives
- Ricky Nelson (Eric Hilliard Nelson, 1940–1985), American actor, musician and singer-songwriter
- Eric Nelson (active 2021), American defense attorney who represented Derek Chauvin in State v. Chauvin

== See also ==
- Eric Nelsen (born 1991), American actor
- Erik Nelson (disambiguation)
