= Amanda Husberg =

American composer of hymns (born 1940)

Amanda Husberg (born 1940 in Chicago, Illinois - February 15, 2021) was an American composer of hymns.

== Education ==
She received her B.S. in Education in 1962, from Concordia Teachers College in Seward, Nebraska, where she majored in Organ, studying with Jan Bender. She taught elementary school for two years at Redeemer Lutheran School in Westfield, New Jersey, before going to Brooklyn, New York, to do parish work. She received her M.S. in Early Childhood Education from Hunter College in New York City.

== Career ==
Before her retirement, Husberg worked for thirty-six years as a Director in one of the 450 publicly funded day care centers in New York City.

For 55 years she has been the Director of Music at St. John the Evangelist Lutheran Church, now a multicultural congregation in the Williamsburg section of Brooklyn. On June 10, 2000, she was presented with the Servant of Christ award from the Atlantic District of the Lutheran Church–Missouri Synod for her contribution to the greater church in the field of music, specifically in the area of hymns and congregational song.

== Composing ==
Husberg has had 286 hymn tunes published in the United States, Canada, Brazil, the United Kingdom, and China. Her hymns are in hymnals and supplements published by a variety of publishers and denominations, including the popular Methodist supplement, The Faith We Sing, which also includes her most popular tune, Jennings-Houston, now published in six different hymnals and supplements, including Lutheran Worship. She has written two liturgical masses, one of which, The Brooklyn Mass, is currently being used at her church. She also has had several choral pieces published.

Her own book of 47 tunes to new texts (including 8 of her own), When You Pass Through the Waters, was published by Wayne Leupold Editions, Inc., in 2005. A new collection of 70 tunes was published in 2012, with texts by Lutheran poet and hymn text writer Gracia Grindal. The texts and tunes cover the New Testament readings for Lectionary year B. She has also composed 15 psalm songs for 2-part choir with refrains for the congregation, texts by Richard Leach. Both parts have instrumental descants. This Psalter was published by Concordia Publishing House in 2012. Concordia Publishing House published a second Psalter book in the series in 2013, and the third book in 2014.

When Husberg first came to St. John's Church, it was entirely African-American. Through the years she has played spirituals, jazz, gospel, and a variety of other styles of music, from Johann Sebastian Bach to Andraé Crouch. All this is reflected in the variety of styles she writes in for her hymns, with a special love of early American pentatonic music and gospel music.

She is a member of the Hymn Society in the United States and Canada and credits them with nurturing her hymn writing efforts. She writes for congregational singing, believing that we do sing with one voice, young and old, people of all walks of life, new singers and experienced singers. Together we sing praise to the One who accepts all our praise, no matter how beautiful it is, or how humble it may be. She is also a member of the American Composers Forum, the Association of Lutheran Church Musicians, and ASCAP, from which she has received yearly awards since 2001.

== The Requiem Mass for Terrance Lindall ==
Husberg completed a resurrection requiem mass "A Feast Prepared", written at the request of Terrance Lindall, a renowned artist of Lutheran upbringing whose illustrations for John Milton's Paradise Lost are the most famous of the 20th century for the subject. The text of the requiem mass is new, written by Lutheran sacred poet and hymn writer Richard Leach. The requiem was premiered in Elizabethtown, Kentucky, the weekend of March 5 and 6, 2011.

Terrance Lindall painted Husberg into his Paradise Lost Altarpiece to honor her and Richard Leach for their efforts on the requiem. A signed and dedicated copy of the requiem is in the collection of the Yuko Nii Foundation and the Robert J. Wickenheiser Milton collection along with full sized Giclee prints of the altarpiece signed by Lindall.

== Published work ==
- Come and Hear the Blessing, Hymns on the Beatitudes (with Richard Leach), Abingdon Press, 2006 ISBN 978-0-687-49131-5
- When You Pass Through the Waters, Wayne Leupold Editions, Inc., 2005 ISBN 1-881162-14-1
- A Feast Prepared: A Requiem, Concordia Publishing House, 2012, 97-7479
- A Treasury of Faith, Lectionary Hymns New Testament Series B, Wayne Leupold Editions, Inc., 2012, ISBN 978-1-881162-43-8
- The Concordia Psalter Series C, Set 1, Concordia Publishing House, 2012, 97-7480
- The Concordia Psalter Series A, Set 2, Concordia Publishing House, 2013, 97-7623
- The Concordia Psalter Series B, Set 3, Concordia Publishing House, 2014, 97-7670
- I Heard the Voice of Jesus Say - 4 pt. choral piece with instrumental descant, Concordia Publishing House,
- I Lift My Eyes to See - 4 pt. choral piece with instrumental descant, text by Stephen Starke, Concordia Publishing House*
- A Treasury of Faith, Lectionary Hymns Old Testament Series C, Wayne Leupold Editions, Inc., 2017, ISBN 978-1-881162-60-5
