= John A. Dalles =

American priest and hymnwriter

John A. Dalles is a clergyman and hymnwriter who was born in Pittsburgh, Pennsylvania, United States. A graduate of Penn State, Lancaster Theological Seminary (Master of Divinity) and Pittsburgh Theological Seminary (Doctor of Ministry), he is an ordained minister in the Presbyterian Church (U.S.A.). Having served the First Presbyterian Church of South Bend, Indiana and the Fox Chapel Presbyterian Church (in a suburb of Pittsburgh, Pennsylvania), from 1997 until 2019 he served as Senior Pastor of Wekiva Presbyterian Church in Longwood, Florida (a suburb of Orlando). Following his 22-year senior pastorate at Wekiva, he was the Interim Senior Minister and Head of Staff of the Shadyside Presbyterian Church, in Pittsburgh, 2019–2021.

As a part of his ministry there, Wekiva Presbyterian Church was the first church in the United States to offer live webcasts of its worship services, an ongoing ministry inaugurated on Sunday, January 2, 2005.

Dalles is known as a prolific writer of texts for hymns. His hymns have been published in hymnbooks used by denominations in the United States, Canada and Australia. He has published three collections of hymns, Come, O Spirit (Educational Ministries, Inc.), Swift Currents and Still Waters (GIA Publications, 2000) and We Turn To God (Wayne Leupold Editions, 2010). His hymn texts have also been set as choral anthems by sacred composers john Ferguson, Glenn Rudolph, John S. Dixon, Dorothy Frisch, and others, published by Oxford University Press, MorningStar, Hinshaw, GIA Publications, Selah and Wayne Leupold Editions.

Among his commissioned hymns are those for Presbyterian Heritage Sunday (Praise God for Days Long Past), Augsburg College, Goshen College, Maryville College, Tusculum College, Wilson College and Knox College, University of Toronto, American University, Pittsburgh Theological Seminary, Lancaster Theological Seminary, the 250th anniversary of the city of Lancaster, Pennsylvania, Peachtree Presbyterian Church and the Lutheran World Federation.

His best known hymns are: "Come, O Spirit", "God Bless Your Church with Strength", "Bless the Ones who Nurture Children", "O God, Behold Your Family Here", and "Make Music for Your Lord to Hear". He has been honored as the winner of a number of hymn searches and contests. His 1985 hymn "O God of Love Grant Us Your Peace" was a co-winner, along with a hymn by Timothy Dudley-Smith in The Hymn Society's search for new hymns on world peace. His hymns were selected in searches for the 30th anniversary of the Presbyterian Association of Musicians ("Celebrate the Gift of Music"), as well as for the Self-Development of People ("Celebrate Hope").

His 2009 hymn, "God Bless the Work Your People Do" was chosen as the winning hymn in the 14th annual Macalester Plymouth United Church Hymn Contest. "Now Is the Time to Speak" was named the 2012 winning hymn in the Macalester-Plymouth 17th Annual Hymn Contest.

He is a Life Member of the Hymn Society in the United States and Canada.

He is married to the former Judith Taylor; they have a son, John Taylor Dalles and a daughter, Anne Elizabeth Dalles.

Thesis:

- The Pastor as Symbol and Visionary: A Study of Two Pastoral Functions in the Multi-Staff Church, Pittsburgh Theological Seminary, 1994.

Books:

- God is the Singer's Friend: 52 Collected Hymn Texts (Greensboro: Wayne Leupold Editions, 2013)
- The Beatitudes: How Happy Are You: Resources for Worship, Education and Nurture, co-author (Leader Resources, 2010)
- We Turn to God: 52 Collected Hymn Texts (Greensboro: Wayne Leupold Editions, 2010)
- Swift Currents and Still Waters: 60 Hymn Texts (Chicago: GIA Publications, 2000)
- In Life and in Death We Belong to God: Euthanasia, Assisted Suicide, and End-of-Life Issues (Presbyterian Church USA General Assembly Commissioned Study Guide, PC (USA), 1995)
- Come, O Spirit (Educational Ministries, Inc., 1992)
