= Merle's Tune =

Merle's Tune is a hymn tune composed by American composer Hal Hopson in 1983 and copyright to Hope Publishing Company. The most common texts used for Merle's Tune are How lovely, Lord, how lovely and Blest Be the God of Israel. Merle's Tune is written in G major with a meter of 76.76 D.
