= Kenichi Nakajima =

Japanese visual artist (born 1978)

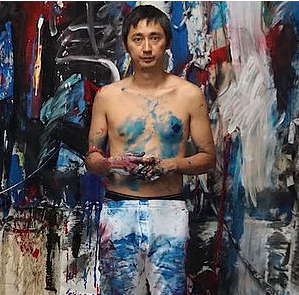
- Born: 中島 健一; 1978 (age 47–48); Sendai, Miyagi Prefecture, Japan
- Education: Sendai Vocational College of Design; Art Students League; National Academy Museum and School
- Occupation: Visual artist

Kenichi Nakajima (中島 健一, Nakajima Kenichi, born 1978) is a Japanese painter, visual artist, and performance artist. He is known for his exhibitions at the Williamsburg Art & Historical Center, including the group exhibitions Life on Earth and Togetherness and Oneness. He has also participated in exhibitions such as The Right to Silence? at the Anya and Andrew Shiva Gallery and the solo exhibition From FEET to Art.

== Early life and education ==
Nakajima was born in 1978. He grew up in Sendai. He graduated from the Sendai Vocational College of Design with a degree in Fine Arts.

He moved to New York City to pursue a career in art in 2007. While studying art at the Art Students League in New York, he received the Xavier and Ethel Edwards Gonzalez Grant and the Edward G. McDowell Travel Grant. He eventually transferred into National Academy Art School.

== Career ==
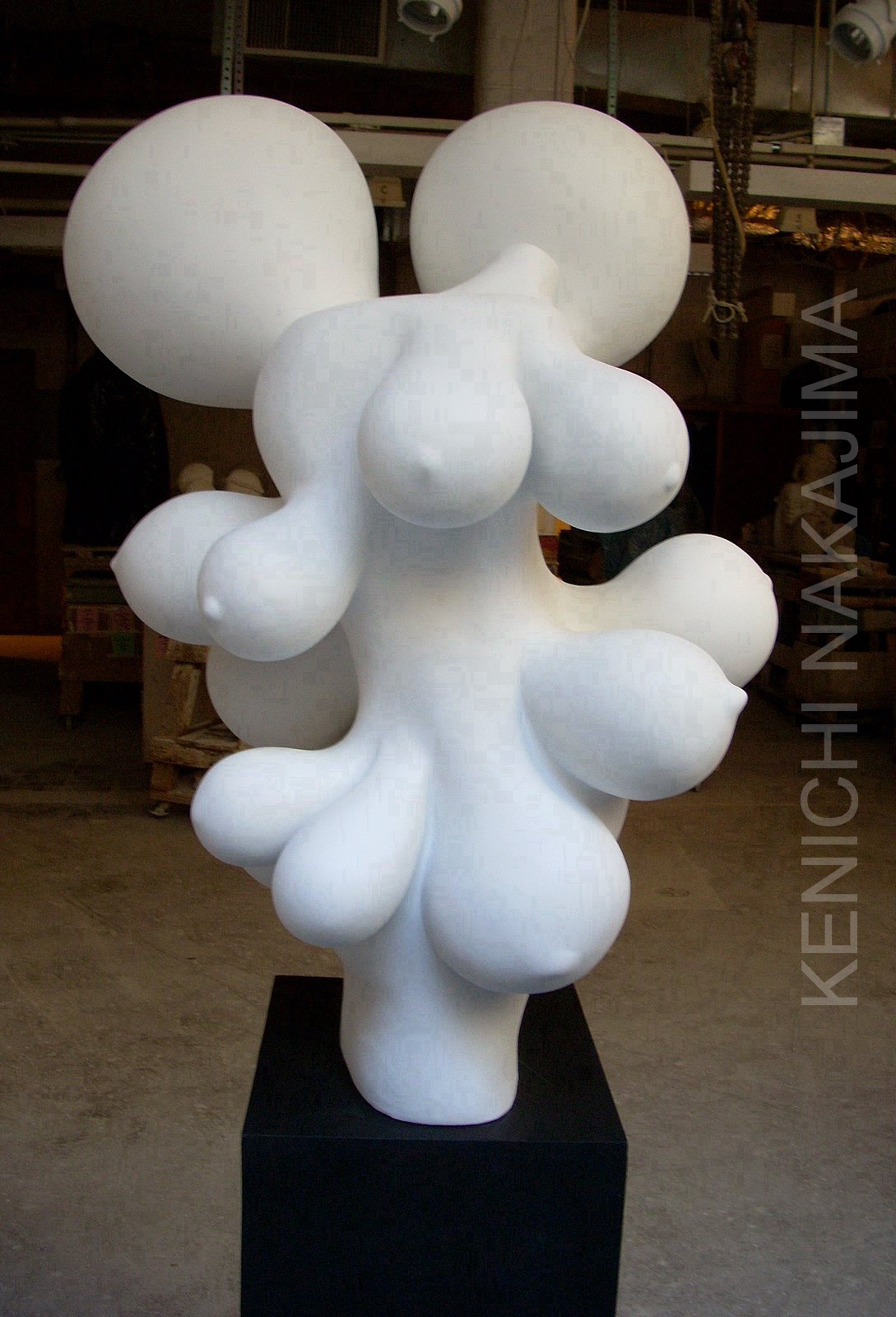
2009, Spray paint, Hydro Cal, styrene foam and wood, 41 x 31 x 30in. In the collection of Yuko Nii Foundation

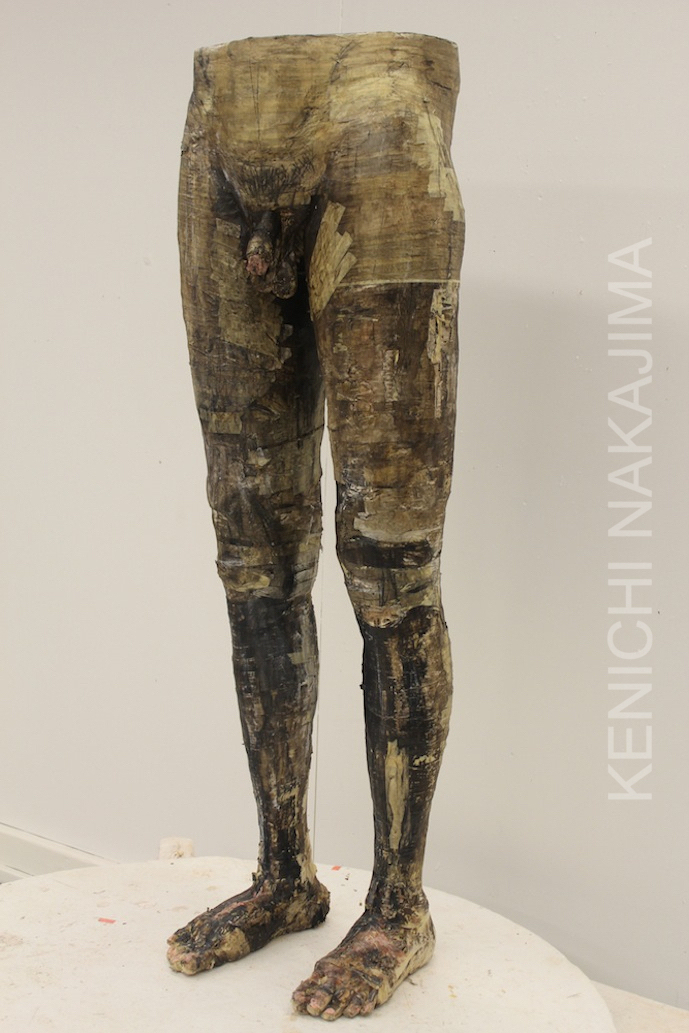
Stand Here, 2013, Acrylic on Cardboard Sculpture, 55 x 17 x 13in.

In 2013, he exhibited at The Grand Harvest and won the award for "The 16th Anniversary Grand Harvest Emerging Artist Award".

Nakajima's work was featured in the group exhibition Significant Matters at the Projekt722 space in Brooklyn in 2013. Nakajima's sculpture Stand Here was also featured in The Trip exhibition at Loft 594 Gallery in New York in the same year.

Stand Here would also be displayed at the NY Coo Gallery as part of the solo exhibition From Feet to Art in 2014. “Foot and Boot” became part of the permanent collection at NY Coo Gallery.

Nakajima also participated in the 4th JART or Japanese Emerging Artists Exhibition at the WAH Center. He would go on to participate in future iterations of JART, such as in 2015 and 2016.

In 2014, Nakajima's work was also featured in the National Academy Museum and School’s group exhibition The Paradox of Sculpture alongside works by other visual artists such as Andy Warhol. Nakajima also collaborated with fellow artist Natsuko Hattori on a two-person show titled Integration and Experiment in the World of Art Work at the Ouchi Gallery in Brooklyn.

Nakajima's work was also part of the group exhibition Lapiz.7, which was exhibited at the SARP (Sendai Artist-Run Place) in 2015. In 2015, Nakajima would also participate in exhibitions such as the WAH Center's WAH Bridges Self, TOKYO art crossing BERLIN in Berlin, Germany, Unusually Natural at the Ideal Glass Gallery in New York, and Boundary-less at the Pleiades Gallery.

As a member of the WAH Salon Art Club, Nakajima has participated in the club's annual art shows from 2015–present. His work is also part of the center's permanent collections.

Nakajima's work was featured in the group exhibition Life on Earth at the WAH Center in 2017. He also contributed to the online exhibition show Deep Stretch in 2018.

Nakajima collaborated with Satoshi Okada on a pop-up two-person exhibition titled Two Self Portraits in 2019. In 2019, Nakajima also displayed his work as part of the SJAC's (Society of Japanese and American Creators) third annual exhibition. He would go on to be a featured artist at the SJAC annual exhibitions in 2021 and 2022.

Nakajima participated in the group exhibition Overall There Is No Wall in May 2019. At the 25th Lower East Side Festival of the Arts, Nakajima's 2015 experimental film collaboration with Yuko Uchida, Inside the Cage, was shown. His work was also displayed as part of the online sculpture exhibition FLUX: Vita Mutata.

Nakajima's work was part of the exhibition The Right to Silence? at the Anya and Andrew Shiva Gallery. In 2021, Nakajima's work was also part of the online sculpture exhibition Up-cycling Detritus, which was organized by the Sculptors Alliance. Nakajima also participated in the exhibitions On the Other Side at HACO New York and Togetherness and Oneness at the WAH Center.

Nakajima has also collaborated with artists such as Rie Nishimura on performance art projects such as Conductor, performed at The Sonic Room in New York in 2017.

== Awards ==
- 2013, The 16th Anniversary Grand Harvest Emerging Artist Award

== Permanent collections ==
- 2014, NY Coo Gallery, "Foot and Boot"
- 2020, Yuko Nii Foundation, Several art pieces
- 2022, HACO Gallery, “My Friend”

== Selected exhibitions ==
- 2013: Significant Matters, Projekt722 Space, Brooklyn, New York, NY
- 2013: The Trip, Loft 594 Gallery, New York, NY
- 2014: 4th Annual Japanese Emerging Artists Exhibition, Williamsburg Art & Historical Center, New York, NY
- 2014: The Paradox of Sculpture, National Academy Museum and School, New York, NY
- 2015: Integration and Experiment in the World of Art Work (two-person show with Natsuko Hattori), Ouchi Gallery, Brooklyn, New York, NY
- 2015: WAH Bridges Self, Williamsburg Art & Historical Center, New York, NY
- 2015: TOKYO art crossing BERLIN, Haus Schwarzenberg, Neurotitan Gallery, Kino Central, Eschschloraque, Epicentro Art, SomoS, Motto Berlin, and Modern Graphics, Berlin, Germany
- 2015: Unusually Natural, Ideal Glass Gallery, New York, NY
- 2015: Boundary-less, Pleiades Gallery, New York, NY
- 2017: Life on Earth, Williamsburg Art & Historical Center, New York, NY
- 2018: Deep Stretch, online exhibition
- 2019: Two Self Portraits (two-person show with Satoshi Okada), 1201 Lexington Ave, New York, NY
- 2019: Third Annual Exhibition: SJAC 2019, Tenri Cultural Institute, New York, NY
- 2019: Overall There is No Wall, 321 Canal Street, New York, NY
- 2020: WAH Salon 21st Anniversary Show, Williamsburg Art & Historical Center, New York, NY
- 2020: 25th Lower East Side Festival of the Arts, New York, NY
- 2020: FLUX: Vita Mutata, online exhibition
- 2021: The Right to Silence?, Anya and Andrew Shiva Gallery, New York, NY
- 2021: 22nd Annual WAH Salon, Williamsburg Art & Historical Center, New York, NY
- 2021: Fourth Annual Exhibition: SJAC 2021, Tenri Cultural Institute, New York, NY
- 2021: Togetherness and Oneness, Williamsburg Art & Historical Center, New York, NY
- 2022: 23nd Annual WAH Salon, Williamsburg Art & Historical Center, New York, NY
- 2022: Fifth Annual Exhibition: SJAC 2022, Tenri Cultural Institute, New York, NY
