= Richard Leach =

Richard Leach may refer to:

- Richard Leach (hymnwriter) (born 1953), American hymn writer and poet
- Richard Leach (physician) (fl. 1980s–2010s), British consultant physician and professor
- Rick Leach (baseball) (born 1957), college football player and professional baseball player

== See also ==
- Rick Leach (born 1964), American tennis player and coach
- Richard Leach Maddox (1816–1902), English photographer and physician
