= Montreat =

Montreat may refer to:

- Montreat, North Carolina, United States
- Montreat Conference Center, located in Montreat, North Carolina, United States
- Montreat College, located in Montreat, North Carolina, United States
