= Naugle =

Naugle is a surname. Notable people with the surname include:

- David Naugle, American Christian author and professor
- Jim Naugle (born 1954), American real estate broker and politician

== See also ==
- Naugle House, historic house in Fair Lawn, New Jersey
- Naugles, defunct Mexican fast food restaurant chain
