= Hal Hopson =

American composer (1933–2025)

Hal H. Hopson (June 12, 1933 – July 20, 2025) was an American composer and church musician residing in Cedar Park, Texas. He had over 3000 published works, which comprise almost every musical form in church music. With a special interest in congregational song, he continued to make a significant contribution to the new repertoire of hymn tunes and responsorial psalm settings as evidenced by the proliferation of his settings that are included in newly published hymnals and psalm collections.

His cantata, God with Us, was one of the few compositions selected by a panel at the Kennedy Space Center, Washington, DC, to be placed in a capsule during the American Bicentennial in 1976. The capsule will be opened at the Tricentennial in 2076 and will be heard again as a representative piece of American choral composition of this century.

Hopson was active as a conductor and clinician, having conducted choral festivals and workshops in United States, Europe, and Asia. Later, he was recognized for his contribution to music by being included in The International Who's Who in Music, Cambridge, England, and by being awarded the esteemed title of National Patron by Delta Omicron, a national professional fraternity of musicians. He had loved music and composing since childhood. He was active in several professional organizations, having served on the national boards of the Presbyterian Association of Musicians and Choristers Guild.

Hopson died on July 20, 2025, at the age of 92.
