= Terrance Lindall =

American artist

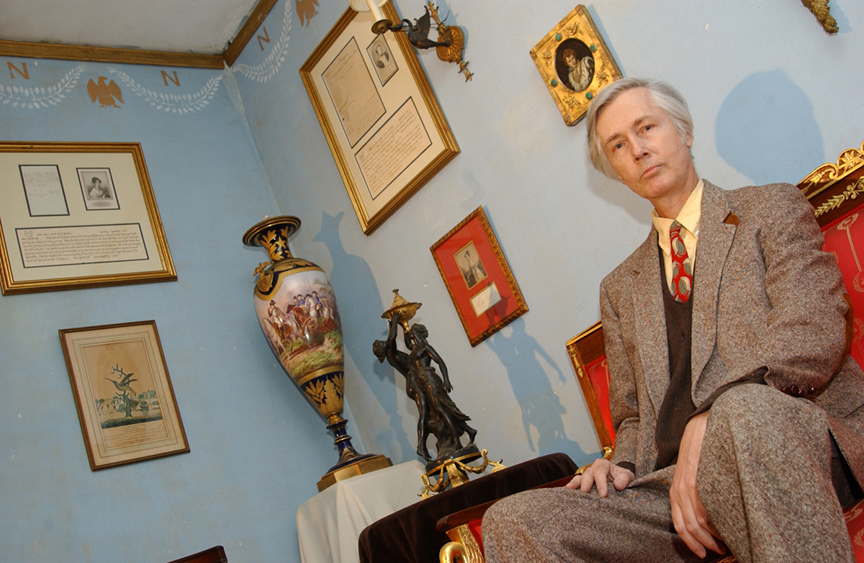
- Terrance Lindall
- Born: 1944 (age 81–82); Minneapolis, Minnesota

Terrance Lindall (born 1944) is an American artist and the co-director and chief administrator of the Williamsburg Art and Historical Center in Brooklyn, New York. Lindall's illustrations have been published in Heavy Metal, Creepy, Eerie and Vampirella, among others.

== Education ==
Born in Minneapolis, Minnesota, Lindall attended the University of Minnesota and Hunter College in New York City, graduating from the latter in 1970 with degrees in Philosophy and English.

== Career ==
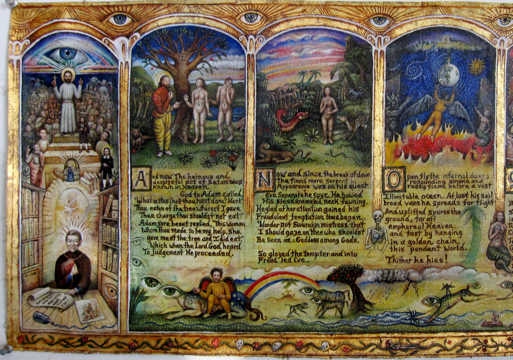
Lindall illustration for Paradise Lost

Lindall has worked in comic books, including Warren Publishing's Creepy, Eerie and Vampirella. According to The Independent, he has also done illustrations for Marvel Comics. His illustrations of John Milton, some of which were originally published in Heavy Metal, have been featured in textbooks and modern printings of Milton's work as well as Lindall's rendition of Paradise Lost in prose. One of his illustrations is featured on the Oxford University website created to support its 400th anniversary celebration of Milton.

Terrance Lindall has worked with Yuko Nii in developing the Williamsburg Art & Historical Center. The Williamsburt Art & Historical Center was the site of a 2008 celebration in honor of Milton's 400th birthday, the Grand Paradise Lost Costume Ball; this event, which featured some of Lindall's illustrations of Milton, gained international attention.

Lindall is also an author and editor. In addition to his prose synopsis of Milton's Paradise Lost, his publication include a collection of short stories, Blue-eyed Satori: And Other Stories, and an article in Time Out New York.

Lindall, 2006

Lindall at the opening ceremony of the Milton festival, 2008

== Select bibliography ==
- Lindall, Terrance R.; Nii, Yuko (1970). Blue-eyed Satori: And Other Stories. T. Gaus Sons.
- Lindall, Terrance R. (1983). John Milton's Paradise Lost: Synopsized and with Illustrations. Rodney Graphics. ISBN 978-0-912493-00-8.
