= Erik Nelson =

Erik Nelson may refer to:

- Erik Nelson (songwriter), American songwriter, music producer and recording engineer
- Erik Nelson (filmmaker), American filmmaker
- Erik Nelson (soccer), soccer player, see 2006 U.S. Open Cup
- Erik Nelson (basketball), see EuroCup Basketball MVP of the Round
- Erik Henning Nelson, see First aerial circumnavigation and Douglas World Cruiser

== See also ==
- Eric Nelson (disambiguation)
