= Eric S. Nelson =

North American philosopher

- Born: 1968 (age 57–58); Chicago
- Spouse: Wu
- Awards: GRF

Education
- Education: Emory University (PhD, 2002)
- Doctoral advisor: Rudolf Makkreel

Philosophical work
- Era: 21st-century philosophy
- Region: North American
- School: continental philosophy and environmental philosophy
- Institutions: The Hong Kong University of Science and Technology
- Main interests: Chinese philosophy, Buddhist philosophy, German philosophy
- Notable ideas: Interculturity

Eric Sean Nelson (born 1968) is a North American philosopher and Chair Professor at the Hong Kong University of Science and Technology. He is known for his works in the continental tradition and Chinese and Buddhist philosophy as well as intercultural philosophy. He is also recognized for hermeneutics, life-philosophy, and phenomenology.

== Books ==
- Heidegger and Dao: Things, Nothingness, Freedom, Bloomsbury, 2023, ISBN 978-1-350-41190-6.
- Daoism and Environmental Philosophy: Nourishing Life, Routledge, 2021, ISBN 978-0-367-02514-4.
- Levinas, Adorno, and the Ethics of the Material Other, SUNY, 2020, ISBN 1438480244.
- Eric S. Nelson (ed.), Interpreting Dilthey: Critical Essays, Cambridge University Press, 2019, ISBN 1107132993.
- Wilhelm Dilthey’s Critical Philosophy: Science, Reflexivity, Individuality, Bloomsbury, 2027, ISBN 978-1-350-65630-7.
- Chinese and Buddhist Philosophy in Early Twentieth-Century German Thought, Bloomsbury, 2017, ISBN 1350002555.
- John E. Drabinski and Eric S. Nelson (eds.), Between Levinas and Heidegger, SUNY Press, 2014, ISBN 1438452579.
- Eric S. Nelson, Antje Kapust, and Kent Still (eds.), Addressing Levinas, Northwestern University Press, 2005, ISBN 978-0-8101-2048-8.
