= Charles Compo =

American musician

Charles Compo is a contemporary American fine artist, composer and multi-instrumentalist.

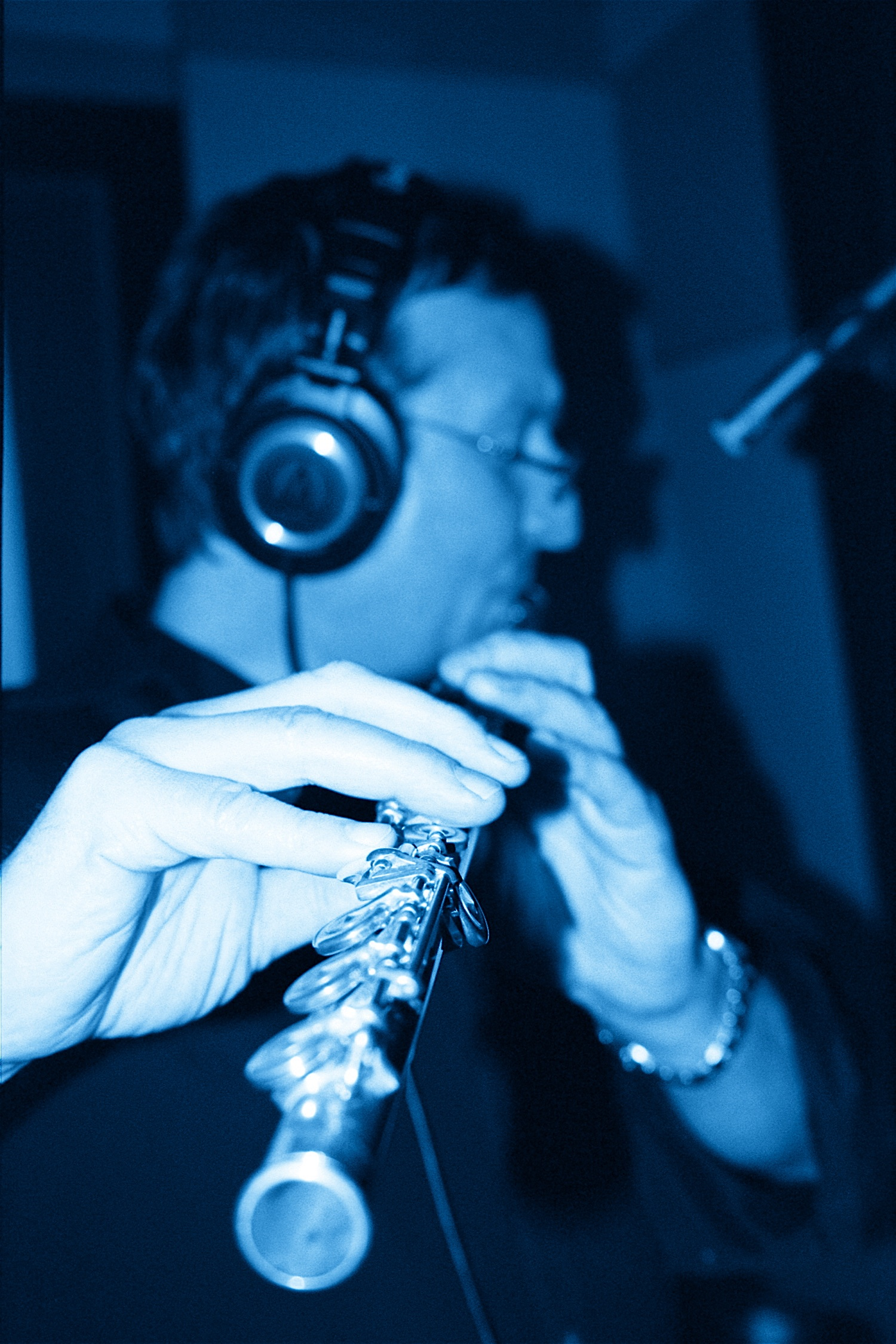
Charles Compo, Bi Coastal Music, 2009

== Family And Early Life ==
Charles Compo was born in 1958 in Jamaica, Queens to jazz violinist Peter Compo and Broadway actress Faith Daltry Compo. He grew up surrounded by music in Ossining NY.

His father recorded and performed with jazz artists like Zoot Sims, Duke Jordon and Lionel Hampton and his mother was part of the original cast of Plain and Fancy on Broadway. His grandfather, Joseph Daltry, founded the music department at Wesleyan University and his grandmother, Faith Merriman, was a soprano with the San Francisco Opera under the direction of Gaetano Merola.

He studied music at his father's school, Compo Conservatory. At the age of 16, Compo began playing in and around New York City with funk bands, club bands, and touring oldies acts including The Ink Spots and The Platters.

== Music career ==
In 1976, he moved to New York City, where he met Harry Smith. Compo composed music for Smith's Film Number 21, as well as for live presentations of Smith’s animations at the Film Makers Collective and Anthology Film Archives. In 1983, Smith introduced Compo to Moses Asch, who signed him to Folkways Records. The Smithsonian/Folkways released Compo's Seven Flute Solos in 1987. From 1986-1990, he worked as assistant to songwriter Ritchie Cordell.

In 1991, he appeared in a number of shows in and around New York City under the stage name Chuck Tempo, including Axel Rhodes in the Off Broadway production of Return to the Forbidden Planet. He also played Fast Eddie in the NBC daytime drama Another World. In 1992, Twyla Tharp commissioned Compo to compose Touch Dance. During this time, Compo also recorded, wrote, and performed on commercial projects for companies such as Hitachi, New York Lotto, ESPN, and Johnson and Johnson.

Compo studied composition and arranging with Don Sebesky and has performed and recorded with jazz artists Curtis Fowlkes, Sahib Shihab, and Roy Campbell Jr., William Hooker, and Ted Daniel. Compo also collaborated with notable hardcore producer Don Fury on the album Doctor Phibe's Portable Darkness. In addition to his consistent work with respected jazz artists, Compo has also supported and performed with pop artists such as Christina Aguilera, Martha Reeves, Bo Diddley, and Julee Cruise.

== Discography ==
- 1983 Seven Flute Solos, Charles Compo, Smithsonian Folkways FW37463
- 1994 Lifeline, William Hooker Quartet, Silkheart Records
- 1994 The Firmament/Fury, William Hooker Ensemble, Silkheart Records
- 1995 Armageddon, William Hooker Ensemble, Homestead Records
- 1995 Radiation, William Hooker Ensemble, Homestead Records
- 1996 Great Sunset, William Hooker, Warm-O-Brisk Records
- 1996 Tibet, William Hooker Quartet, Table of Elements
- 1998 The Distance Between Us, William Hooker, Knitting Factory Records
- 2000 Seventh Moon, Charles Compo, Star Records STR9911
- 2003 Psycho Jammy, Charles Compo, Lakehouse Records 121502LHR
- 2005 Doctor Phibes, Portable Darkness, with Don Fury, Playhouse Ventures
- 2007 Soothing Music of the Savage Beast, The Phibes, Lakeside Records
- 2009 The Phibes, Lakeside Music
- 2010 Mind Frame, Patrick Henry Music
- 1997 Hennen, Bakr and Compo, Piano Magic
- 2012 Foolish Pleasure, Charles Compo, Chaos Music Company
- 2013 The Dream Logic LP, The Dream Logic, Chaos Music Company
- 2015 My Black Arts, The Dream Logic, Chaos Music Company
- 2017 Liquid Sunshine, The Dream Logic, Chaos Music Company
- 2019 Son of The Drum Song,Mustafa Ahmed, Chaos Music Company
- 2021 Big Moon, William Hooker, Dusty Groove Records

== Fine Art career ==
Originally a collector of Lower East Side artists in the 1980’s, notable artists in his collection of Rivington School artists include work by Shalom Neuman, Phil Rostek, Fa-Q (Kevin Wendell), and Miss Understood. He began a painting practice of his own as he naturally became immersed in the New York art scene, and worked briefly as an assistant to Andy Warhol in 1985 before Warhol's death. Compo’s painting style is considered an intuitive process, expression of narratives inspired by everyday life. His artwork has now been exhibited throughout the United States and Europe, including a painting selected to debut at the 2021 London Biennale. In December 2021 A selection of his work was acquired by The Yuko Nii Foundation’s Permanent Collection. The selected work “Down At The Rally” had also been awarded a special prize by MOMA curator Paulina Pabocha, at the WAH Center’s juried exhibition “America The Beautiful: The Real and Imagined”. The show was promoted in conjunction with Smithsonian Magazine’s Museum day, and ran from September–November 2021.

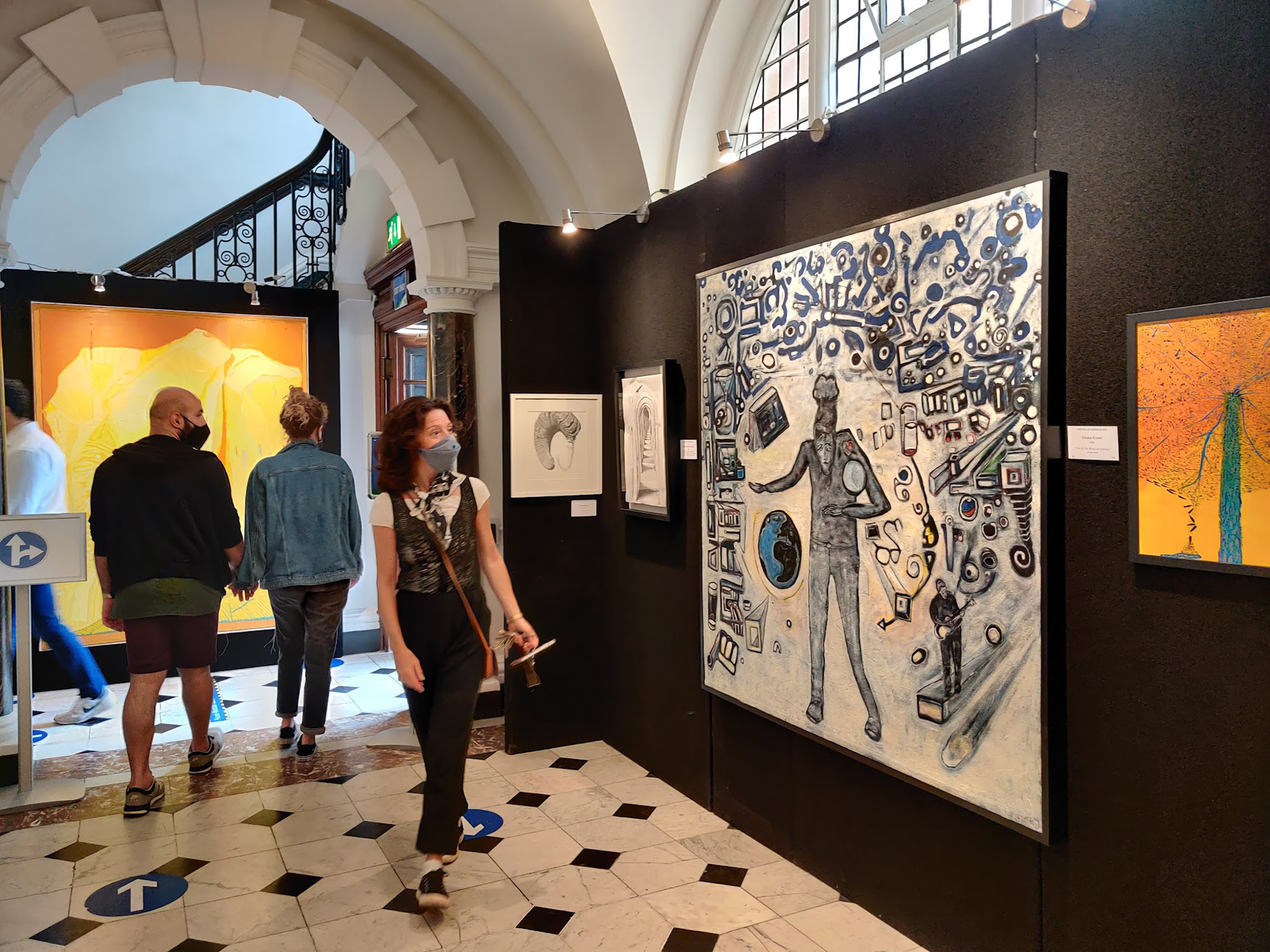
"I've Got The World On A String", Oil on Canvas by Charles Compo, exhibited at the 2021 London Biennale

== Permanent Collections ==
- 2021 The Yuko Nii Foundation’s Permanent Collection, The Williamsburg Art & Historical Center, Brooklyn, NY
- 2022 Museo D’Arte Chianciano Terme, Chianciano, Italy
- 2022 The Leigh Yawkey Woodson Art Museum, Wausau, WI
- 2023 The Wausau Museum Of Contemporary Art, Wausau, WI

== Select Exhibition History ==
- 2021 Psychodramatic Landscapes, Solo Show, Pictor Gallery, New York, NY
- 2021 The London Art Biennale, Chelsea Old Town Hall, London, UK
- 2021 “PAINT” Juried Show, Silvermine Gallery, New Canaan, CT
- 2021 “Unprecedented” Juried Show, Healdsburg Center for the Arts, Healdsburg, CA
- 2021 “Made In New York” Juried Show, Schweinfurth Center For The Arts, Auburn, NY, Second Prize Winner*
- 2021 “Bold Expressions” Northern California Arts, Inc, Carmichael, CA
- 2021 “ICON” International Juried Show, Boomer Gallery, Tower Bridge, London, UK
- 2021 “America The Beautiful” Juried Show, Williamsburg Art & Historical Center, Brooklyn NY, Special Prize Winner*
- 2021 “Mystery, Magic, Macabre” Juried Show, Deines Cultural Center, Russel, KS
- 2021 CCAN Juried show, Center for Contemporary Arts, Abilene, TX
- 2021 7th National Juried Exhibition, Oxford Arts Alliance, Oxford, PA, Second Prize Winner*
- 2021 The Works Acquired in the Yuko Nii Foundation’s Permanent Collection, Williamsburg Art & Historical Center, Brooklyn NY
- 2022 5th Biennale Wings and Water, River Arts, Inc. Prairie Du Sac, WI
- 2022 12th Annual Art & Earth Juried Art Exhibit, Berkeley Arts Council, Martinsburg, WV
- 2022 64th National Juried Show, Rocky Mount Imperial Center for the Arts, Rocky Mount, NC
- 2022 The Unknown Nature of Being, Tubac Center of the Arts, Tubac, AZ
- 2022 Six Summit Gallery, Windows of Port Authority Bus Terminal, New York, NY
- 2022 National Juried Show, Brooklyn Waterfront Artists Coalition, Brooklyn, NY
- 2022 105th Annual Juried Exhibition at Bendheim Gallery, Greenwich Art Society, Greenwich, CT
- 2022 A Queens Fine Art Spring AFFAIR, Culture Lab LIC, Long Island City, NY
- 2022 Jigsaw Snap, Annual Members Show, Starta Arta, New York, NY
- 2022 35th Northern National Art Competition, Nicolet College Lakeside Center, Rhinelander, WI
- 2022 Adams County Arts Council, Schmucker Art Gallery, Gettysburg College, Gettysburg, PA
- 2022 INNOVATIONS, International Society of Experimental Artists, Gallery of St. Albert, Alberta, CA
- 2022 The 22nd Annual Vivian & Stanley Reed Marine Show, Townhouse Gallery, Stamford, CT, Third Prize Winner*
- 2022 National Juried Exhibition, Providence Art Club, Providence, RI, First Prize Edward Mitchell Bannister Award*
- 2022 Leigh Yawkey Woodson Art Museum, 2022 Birds in Art exhibition, Wausau, WI
- 2022 The Chianciano Biennale, Museo D’arte di Chianciano, Chianciano, Italy
- 2022 Visions of Hope Juried exhibition, Stola Contemporary Art, Chicago, IL
- 2023 Solo Show Tulsa Artists’ Coalition, Tulsa, OK
- 2023 6th Annual National Juried Exhibition, The Wausau Museum of Contemporary Art, Wausau, WI
- 2023 Winter Escape Juried Exhibition, Stamford Art Association, Stamford, CT
- 2023 Tarot exhibition, Memento Mori Gallery, Lakewood, CO
- 2023 O’Keeffe Juried exhibition, Blacksburg Museum & Cultural Foundation, Blacksburg, VA
