= Eric Nelson (musician) =

American conductor

- Born: Eric Nelson
- Education: Houghton College; Westminster Choir College; Indiana University School of Music
- Genres: Choral music
- Occupations: Choral conductor, composer, clinician
- Member of: Emory University (Director of Choral Studies)

Eric Nelson is an American choral conductor, clinician and composer.

== Education ==
Nelson received his training in voice and choral conducting at Houghton College, Westminster Choir College (master of music) and Indiana University School of Music (doctor of music, 1990).

== Career ==
Eric Nelson is the director of choral studies at Emory University, where he teaches graduate choral conducting and choral literature. He conducts Emory's 40-voice Concert Choir and its 180-voice University Chorus. In 2004, he received the "Crystal Apple" award for excellence in teaching at the university. He is also the artistic director of the Atlanta Master Chorale, a 60-voice adult chamber choir specialising in a Capella repertoire.

Nelson has conducted choirs throughout North America and Europe, including performances in Krakow, Berlin, Leipzig, Prague, Moscow, Washington, D.C., Carnegie Hall, Lincoln Center, Spivey Hall, the Piccolo Spoleto Festival, and both the Southern and National Conventions of the ACDA. His ensembles have been praised for their ability to combine a high level of technical precision with warmth of musical expression.

Nelson has conducted and presented workshops for the American Choral Directors Association, the Music Educator's National Conference, the Association of Lutheran Church Musicians, the Presbyterian Association of Musicians, the American Guild of Organists, Chorister's Guild, Church Music Explosion (at Coral Ridge Presbyterian Church) and for numerous other churches, colleges and universities.

== Works ==
Nelson is a composer of choral music whose works are published by Colla Voice and Augsburg Fortress.

=== Colla Voice ===
- "Music, When Soft Voices Die" - In memory of Deborah A. Hunter, text by Percy Bysshe Shelley. (SATB with piano accompaniment)

Text

Music, when soft voices die,
Vibrates in the memory;
Odours, when sweet violets sicken,
Live within the sense they quicken.

Rose leaves, when the rose is dead,
Are heap'd for the beloved's bed;
And so thy thoughts, when thou art gone,
Love itself shall slumber on.

=== Augsburg Fortress ===
- "How Can I Keep from Singing?": (SATB, a cappella, released: February 4, 2002)
- "It is Well With My Soul": (SATB, piano accompaniment, released: March 2, 2005)
