= John Ferguson (organist) =

American organist, teacher, and composer

John Allen Ferguson (January 27, 1941 - January 5, 2025) was an American organist, teacher, and composer.

Ferguson is probably best known for his many choral compositions. He has also published alternate accompaniments and festival arrangements for organ, brass, and percussion of hymns and Lutheran liturgy, and has appeared on several recordings. He has more than 100 titles to his credit.

Ferguson was born on January 27, 1941 in Cleveland, Ohio. He earned a B.M. from Oberlin Conservatory of Music, an M.M. from Kent State University, and a D.M.A. from the Eastman School of Music, where he studied with Russell Saunders. Ferguson is a well-respected organ teacher and leader of congregational singing via the organ. He has been invited as a visiting professor by the faculties of the University of Notre Dame and the Yale Institute of Sacred Music. His work has received national acclaim. The anthem "Who Is This" received the 2005 Raabe Prize for Excellence in Sacred Composition.

Ferguson's name is often associated with hymnody and the words "hymn festival." He frequently is invited to design and lead such events, both in local congregations and at gatherings of organists, choral conductors, and church musicians. His festivals are ecumenical experiences drawing upon the treasures of Christian song from many centuries, traditions, and styles.

Long associated with the Holtkamp Organ Company, Ferguson's doctoral dissertation was on the work of Walter Holtkamp Sr. "Walter Holtkamp: American Organ Builder" was published in 1979 by Kent State University Press. He also served as music editor of the United Church of Christ Hymnal, published in 1974.

He worked as both professor of music at Kent State University and organist-choirmaster at Kent United Church of Christ until 1978. He later worked as the director of music at Central Lutheran Church in Minneapolis, Minnesota. In 1983 he became the Elliot & Klara Stockdahl Johnson professor of organ and church music at St. Olaf College, Northfield, Minnesota, and later became the conductor of the St. Olaf Cantorei. His late wife, Ruth, was also an organist, and they have a son, Christopher. Ruth Ferguson died on March 23, 2014, in Northfield, Minnesota, at the age of 71.

Ferguson died on January 5, 2025 in Northfield, Minnesota at the age of 83.
