= Yuko Nii =

Japanese artist and philanthropist

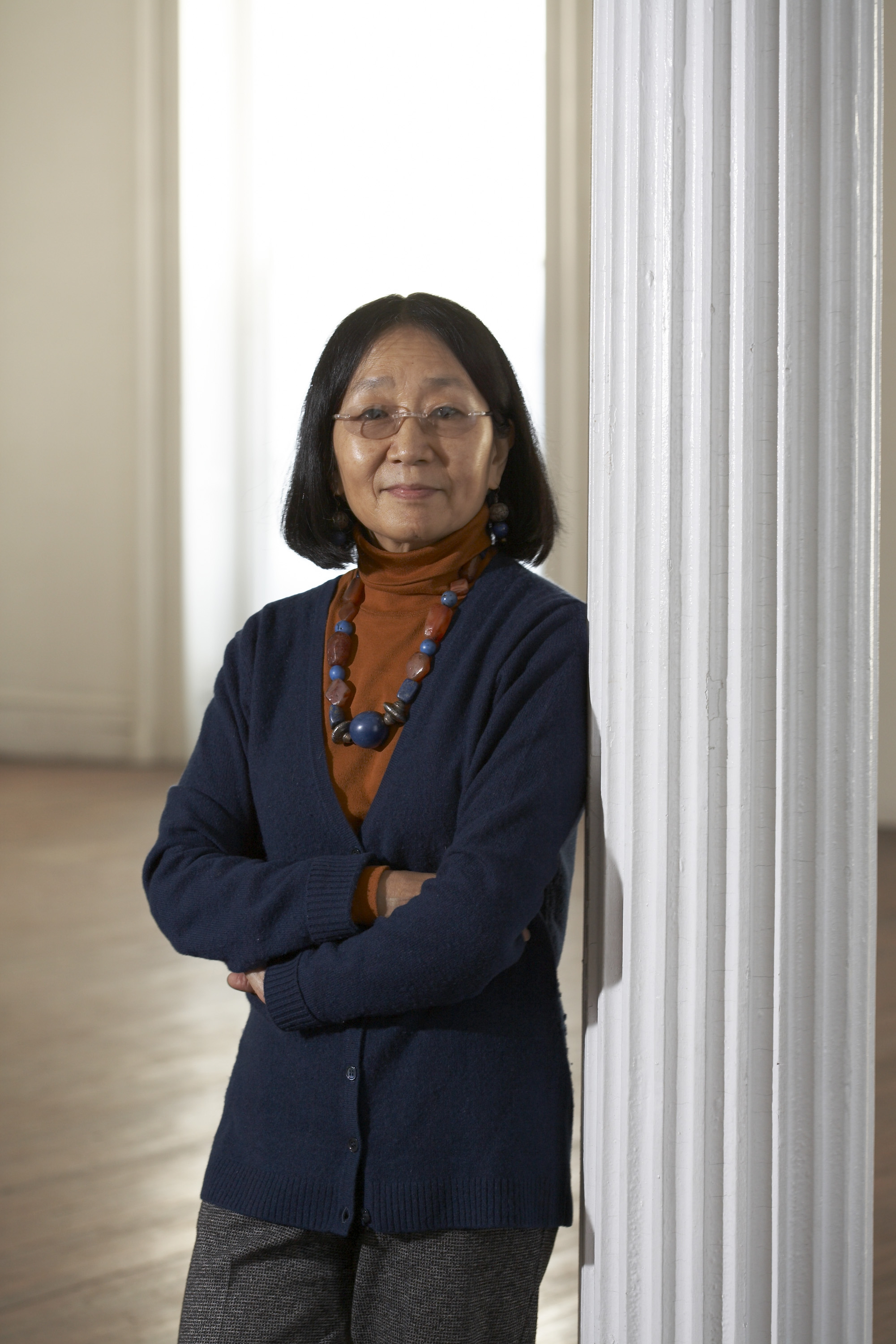
- Yuko Nii at the Williamsburg Art & Historical Center (2006)
- Born: 1942 (age 83–84)
- Occupations: Artist, philanthropist
- Years active: 1969-present

Yuko Nii (born 1942) is a Japanese artist and philanthropist. Her work has included painting, printmaking, graphic design, stage set, costume and fashion design. She has written journalism, poetry, fiction, essays and philosophy, and published two books. She also runs the non-profit organization Yuko Nii Foundation.

== Early life and education ==
Nii was born in 1942. She is from Tokyo. She studied (1961–63) English and American Literature at Aoyama Gakuin University, Tokyo, Japan. In 1963 she transferred to Macalaster College, St. Paul, Minnesota as a scholarship student, and earned her BFA. in 1965. From 1966 she attended Pratt Institute, Brooklyn, New York, as a fellowship student and earned her Master of Fine Arts in painting in 1969.

== Williamsburg Art & Historical Center ==
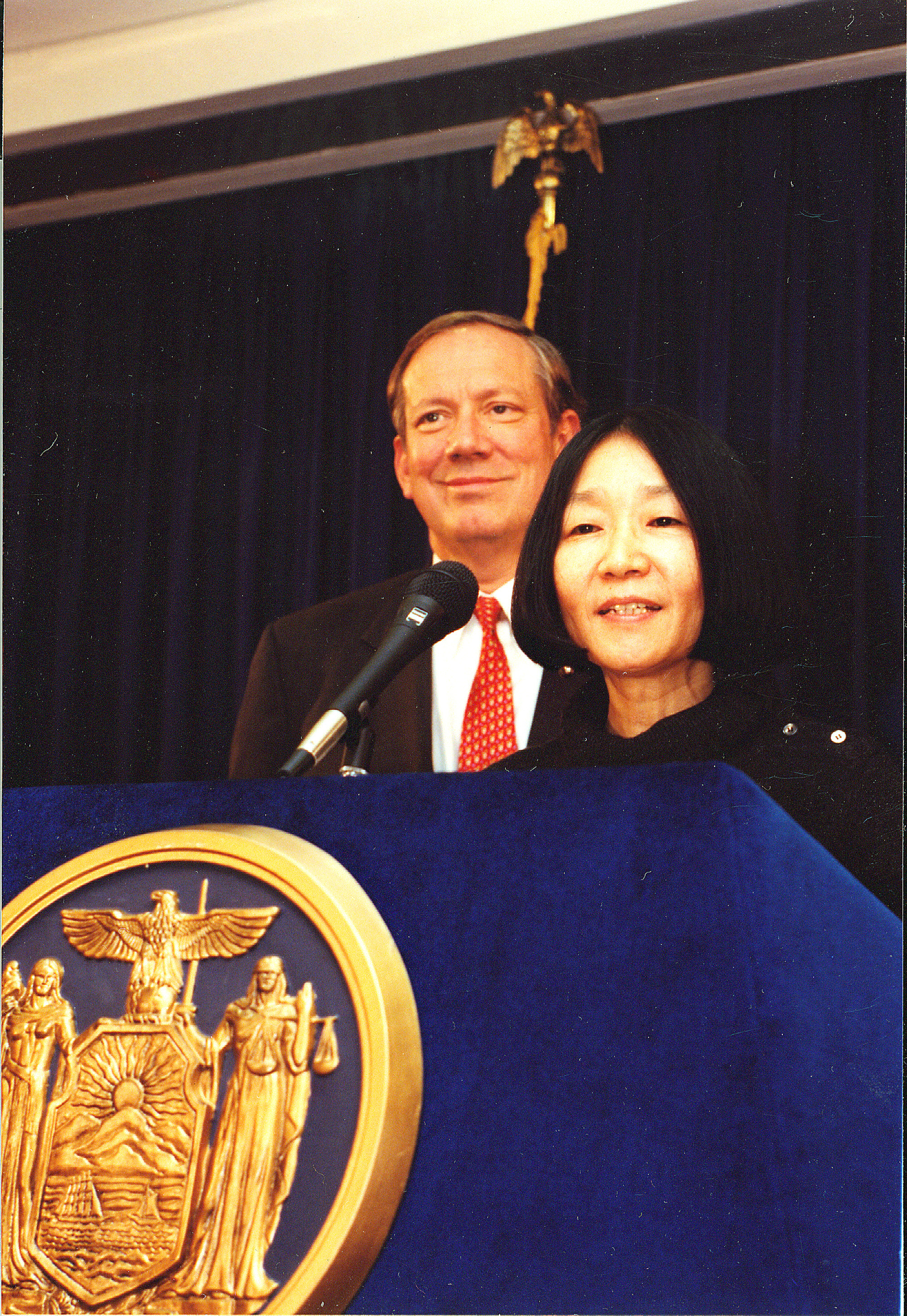
With then-New York Governor George Pataki in 2001.

In 1996, Nii founded the non-profit Williamsburg Art & Historical Center (WAH Center) in Williamsburg, Brooklyn, New York, which is housed in the Kings County Savings Bank Building in the National Register of Historic Places - a New York City Landmark.

== Yuko Nii Foundation ==
In 2008, she launched the non-profit Yuko Nii Foundation to hold, maintain and preserve contemporary art and historical artifacts and properties, including the landmark building, which Yuko Nii purchased in 1996 and later donated to the Yuko Nii Foundation in 2008. The collection includes many Japanese art pieces from the 16th through the 20th century. Some of the artists include Ilya Bolotowsky, Jerry Rudquist, Ansei Uchima, Toshiko Uchima, Judy Chicago, Faith Ringgold, Toshiko Takaezu, Yoko Ono, Yayoi Kusama, Terrance Lindall, Doug Buebe, Beatrice Coron, Kenichi Nakajima, Charles Compo, and as well as her own artworks.

== Honors and awards ==
In 1998, Howard Golden, then Brooklyn borough president, named Nii Brooklyn’s Women of the Year. In 2001, Governor George Pataki named Nii a "Woman of Excellence, Vision and Courage."

== Bibliography ==
- Blue Eyed Satori. Terrance R. Lindall, Yuko Nii, 1970
- Yuko Nii: Art and Achievements, 2017 ISBN 9780971387409
