= Eric W. Nelson =

American historian

- Born: 1970 (age 55–56)
- Awards: Nancy Lyman Roelker Prize

Academic background
- Education: University of Oxford (PhD, 1999), George Washington University (BA, 1992)

Academic work
- Discipline: history
- Sub-discipline: the Jesuits, religious peacemaking
- Institutions: Missouri State University, The University of Southern Mississippi

Eric W. Nelson (born 1970) is an American historian and Professor of History at Missouri State University. He is known for his works on the Jesuits. Nelson is a winner of Nancy Lyman Roelker Prize for Best Article in French History for his essay "Remembering the Martyrdom of Saint Francis of Paola: History, Memory and Minim Identity in Seventeenth-Century France".

== Books ==
- Layered Landscapes: Early-Modern Religious Space Across Faiths and Cultures. eds. E. Nelson and J. Wright (New York and London: Routledge, 2017).
- Ways of the World: A Brief Global History with Sources (Boston: Bedford St. Martins, 2016)
- After the League: Politics and Religion in Early Bourbon France, eds E. Nelson and A. Forrestal (Basingstoke: Palgrave Academic Press, 2009)
- The Jesuits and the Monarchy: Catholic Reform and Political Authority in France (Aldershot: Ashgate, 2005)
- Justice and Violence: Political Violence, Pacifism and Cultural Transformation, eds E. Nelson, T. Lansford and A. Eickelman. Aldershot UK, Ashgate Academic Publishing, 2005.
- Ways of the World: A Brief Global History with Sources. with Robert Strayer. 3rd edn. Boston: Bedford St. Martin's, 2016.
