= Presbyterian Association of Musicians =

Presbyterian Association of Musicians (PAM) is a national organization of the Presbyterian Church (USA) for people who are involved in the areas of Reformed Christian worship, Church music, and liturgical arts. The national offices for this 1,600 member organization are located in Louisville at the National Office of the Presbyterian Church (USA). "Members of the Presbyterian Association of Musicians (PAM) include choir directors, organists, ministers, and other persons interested in the quality and integrity of music in the worship experience."

== History ==
PAM's origins are rooted in the Montreat Worship and Music Conference which was created to provide professional support for Presbyterian musicians. The Presbyterian General Assembly asked the Board of Christian Education to make a recommendation to create opportunities to educate church musicians. On August 2, 1956, the first conference was held at the Montreat Conference Center. The purpose was to give "comprehensive and practical help to all people concerned with better church music."

After fourteen years of the Montreat Worship and Music Conference, the Board of Christian Education was unable to continue financial support of the conference. An ad hoc committee was formed to create an association for the musicians. On July 26, 1970, the Presbyterian Association of Musicians was formed to support of the Montreat Worship and Music Conference.

== Worship and music conferences ==
The week-long Montreat Worship and Music Conference is held at Montreat Conference Center and is repeated the following week. This intergenerational conference offers a wide variety of classes and ensembles that provide musical, liturgical and theological instruction.

The Mo-Ranch/Presbyterian Association of Musicians Conference (MoPAM) is the union of two worship and music conferences. The annual week-long Mo Ranch conference merged with the PAM West conference in 2009 to create an annual worship and music conference at Mo Ranch.

PAM has held biennial National Gatherings for church professionals since 2005 in partnership with Presbyterian Seminaries. These gatherings, typically held in February, are two-three day conferences focusing on topics that are of importance to church musicians, pastors and educators who are working in the church. The gatherings are open to all church professionals.

Past PAM Professionals Gatherings

- 2005-National Office of the Presbyterian Church (USA), Louisville, KY
- 2007-Columbia Theological Seminary, Decatur (Atlanta), GA
- 2009-Austin Presbyterian Theological Seminary, Austin, TX
- 2011-Princeton Theological Seminary, Princeton, NJ
- 2013-First Presbyterian Church, Charlotte, NC
- 2015-Louisville Presbyterian Theological Seminary, Louisville, KY
- 2017-Austin Presbyterian Theological Seminary, Austin, TX

== Presbyterian hymnal ==
The 2004 Presbyterian General Assembly gave authorization to the Presbyterian Publishing Corporation, the Presbyterian Association of Musicians, and the Office of Theology and Worship to begin research into the feasibility of a new Presbyterian hymnal. The results of this feasibility study were to be reported to the 217th General Assembly in 2006 which granted authorization for the Presbyterian Publishing Corporation to research, develop, and produce a new hymnal.
