= Rudolf Makkreel =

American philosopher (1939–2021)

Rudolf Adam Makkreel (1939 – October 2021) was a Belgian-born American philosopher. He was Charles Howard Candler Professor Emeritus of Philosophy at Emory University.

== Early life ==
Rudolf Makkreel was born in 1939 in Antwerp, Belgium and grew up in The Hague in the Netherlands. He immigrated to the US in 1951 and received his BA and PhD from Columbia University.

== Career ==
He taught at the University of California, San Diego, until 1973 and at Emory University until 2013. He was the editor of the Journal of the History of Philosophy from 1983 to 1998 and then president of its board of directors until 2018.

Makkreel's work is concentrated on hermeneutics and aesthetics by developing ideas from the German philosophers Wilhelm Dilthey and Immanuel Kant. Makkreel has focused on the roles of the imagination, judgment, and interpretation within Kant's critical system. The implications of Kant's conception of reflective judgment for hermeneutics and for the theory of the human sciences are also central to Makkreel's writings.

Makkreel has shown some important parallels between Kant's determinant-reflective judgment distinction and Dilthey's explanation-understanding distinction. Neither distinction is merely oppositional. Makkreel has argued that reflective judgments can provide the framework for determinant judgments and that the understanding of contextual socio-cultural systems in the human sciences leaves room for delimited lawful historical explanations.

Some other themes that pervade Makkreel's writings include the difference between orientational and foundational principles as well as the relation between reflexive awareness and reflective consciousness. Our inner experience is not based on inner perception or acts of ocular introspection but on a directly felt reflexive self-awareness that coexists with outer experience. This reflexive awareness can orient the more mediated reflective consciousness of the world made possible by outer experience. Makkreel regards human experience as a complex of 1) what is aesthetically and medially assimilated from our surroundings, 2) how this is cognitively acquired through conceptualization, and 3) how this is reflectively appropriated into an overall perspective on the world. When disputes arise about meaning claims about the world, hermeneutics must diagnose at what level of experience a misunderstanding has arisen.

== Works ==
- Dilthey, Philosopher of the Human Studies, Princeton University Press, 1975, 1992.
- Imagination and Interpretation in Kant, University of Chicago Press, 1990.
- "Reflection, Reflective Judgment and Aesthetic Exemplarity' in "Aesthetics and Cognition in Kant's Critical Philosophy". Ed. Rebecca Kukla. Cambridge, 2006.
- Orientation and Judgment in Hermeneutics, University of Chicago Press, 2015.

Makkreel was also the editor with Frithjof Rodi of Wilhelm Dilthey: Selected Works (Princeton University Press).

- Volume I: Introduction to the Human Sciences, Princeton University Press, 1989.
- Volume II: Understanding the Human World, Princeton University Press, 2010.
- Volume III: The Formation of the Historical World in the Human Sciences, Princeton University Press, 2002.
- Volume IV: Hermeneutics and the Study of History, Princeton University Press, 1996.
- Volume V: Poetry and Experience, Princeton University Press, 1985.
- Volume VI: Ethical and World-View Philosophy, Princeton University Press, 2019.
