= David Naugle =

American writer and academic (1952–2021)

David Keith Naugle (1952–2021) was an American author and professor. He was considered an expert on the Christian worldview.

== Education ==
- Systematic Theology, Th.D. (Dallas Theological Seminary)
- Humanities, Ph.D. (University of Texas at Arlington)

== Career ==
Naugle was an associate pastor at Fort Worth Bible Church, Fort Worth, Texas.

He then worked at the University of Texas at Arlington from 1980 to 1988 as an adjunct professor of religion. He continued his pastoral work in Arlington during this time.

Naugle then joined Dallas Baptist University as professor and later head of the philosophy department. He was a supporter of Amyraldism and Neo-Calvinism.

During his time at DBU, he began a weekly lecture series called the “Friday Symposium”. It featured presentations by DBU's faculty, students, and off-campus lecturers on a broad range of topics. He also began the annual “Summer Institute for Christian Scholarship”, a ten-week faculty enrichment program for Dallas Baptist University's professors.

He was the director of the Paideia College Society (formerly the Pew College Society) at DBU. PCS worked with students in the area of Christian humanism and classical liberal education.

== Books ==
He authored Worldview: The History of a Concept in 2003 which was selected by Christianity Today as the "Book of the Year" in its theology and ethics category. The Peking University Press has since translated it into Chinese.

Naugle also wrote Reordered Loves, Reordered Lives: Learning the Deep Meaning of Happiness and Philosophy: A Student's Guide.

He co-wrote An Introduction to Christian Worldview: Pursuing God's Perspective In A Pluralistic World with Tawa J. Anderson and W. Michael Clark.

== Personal life ==
Naugle was married to Deemie and they had one daughter.

Naugle died on Friday, June 11, 2021.
