= Richard Leach (hymnwriter) =

American hymn writer and poet (born 1953)

Richard Leach (born in Bangor, Maine in 1953) is an American hymn writer and poet.

He received a B.A from Bowdoin College in 1974, and an M.Div. from Princeton Theological Seminary in 1978. He was a United Church of Christ pastor in Connecticut from 1978 to 1999. He began writing hymns in 1987. In 1999 he left the ministry of the United Church of Christ and became a member of the Evangelical Lutheran Church in America. He is a member of The Hymn Society in the United States and Canada.

== Published works ==
- Tuned for Your Sake, Selah Publishing Co., 2007 ISBN 0-9677408-9-4
- New Harmony, A Harp of Thousand Strings (with David Ashley White), Selah Publishing Co., 2006
- Come and Hear the Blessing, Hymns on the Beatitudes (with Amanda Husberg), Abingdon Press, 2006
- Honey from the Rock (with various composers), Selah Publishing Co., 2005
- We Sing the Shoreline (with various composers), Selah Publishing Co., 2004
- Pray Then Like This, A Hymn Cycle on the Lord’s Prayer (with Carson Cooman), Selah Publishing Co., 2002
- Go Worship at Emmanuel’s Feet, Selah Publishing Co., 2001
- Memory, Take the Hand of Hope, Selah Publishing Co., 2000
- Carpenter, Why Leave the Bench, Selah Publishing Co., 1996
- Over the Waves of Words (with various composers), Selah Publishing Co., 1996
- Feel the Spirit in the Kicking, Selah Publishing Co., 1995
