= Montreat Conference Center =

Coordinates: 35.64778°N 82.2993°W

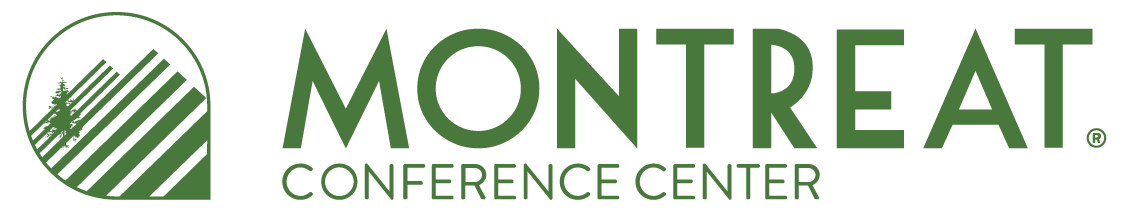
- Founder: Rev. John C. Collins
- Type: 503(c)(3) religious organization
- Headquarters: PO Box 969, Montreat, NC, 28757
- Location: Montreat, North Carolina
- Key people: Richard DuBose, President; Richard Sills, Chief Financial Officer; Emily Causey, VP for Hospitality and Facilities; Seth Hagler, VP for Development; Carol Steele, VP for Program; Tanner Pickett, VP for Sales, Marketing, and Communications
- Website: www.montreat.org

Montreat Conference Center (also known as the Mountain Retreat Association) located in Montreat, North Carolina, United States, is a conference center serving the Presbyterian Church (U.S.A.). The word "Montreat" is a portmanteau of the words "mountain" and "retreat."

== Geography ==
Montreat Conference Center is located just east of Asheville, North Carolina and in close proximity to Black Mountain, North Carolina. Montreat consists of approximately 4,000 acres (16 km^{2}) of land, 2,460 acres (10.0 km^{2}) of which are protected under a conservation easement.

== History ==
- 1897 – A group of ecumenical church leaders, led by United Church of Christ minister John Collins, formed the Mountain Retreat Association (MRA). Its purpose was to establish an interdenominational resort and retreat center.
- 1905 - J.R. Howerton and the Synod of North Carolina purchased 4,000 acres (16 km^{2}) of the valley to be owned by the Mountain Retreat Association.
- 1907 - The Mountain Retreat Association holds the first Presbyterian conference.
- 1922 - Construction completed on Anderson Auditorium, a large meeting space able to seat 1,500 people.
- 1924 - A concrete dam was constructed (to replace an old wooden one) with funds donated by Susan Graham and her son, Allen. The resulting Lake Susan, a prominent feature in Montreat, was named in her honor.
- 1924 - Construction of the Assembly Inn was completed.
- 1926 - The Presbyterian Church in the United States opens the Historic Foundation of the Presbyterian and Reformed Churches at Montreat.
- 1933 - Montreat Normal School became first Montreat Junior College and then Montreat-Anderson College.
- 1967 - The Town of Montreat was incorporated.
- 1974 - The Mountain Retreat Association and Montreat-Anderson College became two separate organizations. Montreat-Anderson College then became Montreat College.
- 1983 - The Mountain Retreat Association became known as Montreat Conference Center when the United Presbyterian Church in the United States of America reunited with the Presbyterian Church (US) to become the Presbyterian Church, USA.
- 2004 - 2,460 acres (10.0 km^{2}) of Montreat was placed under a conservation easement to protect the valley from development.
- 2006 - The Presbyterian Historical Society's office at Montreat is closed and the collection moved to other repositories.
