= Kings County Savings Bank =

Historic commercial building in Brooklyn, New York

Coordinates: 40°42′37″N 73°57′51″W

- Kings County Savings Bank Building (Williamsburg Art & Historical Center)
- U.S. National Register of Historic Places
- New York City Landmark
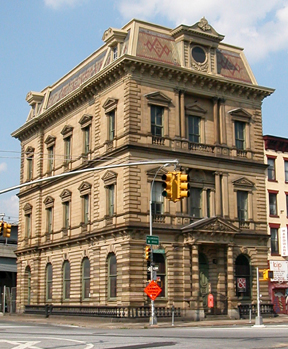
- (2005)

- Location within New York City Location within New York Location within the United States
- Location: 135 Broadway; Brooklyn, New York City
- Built: 1867
- Architects: Gamaliel King & William H. Willcox
- Architectural style: French Second Empire
- NRHP reference No.: 80002632
- NYCL No.: 0165

Significant dates
- Added to NRHP: April 16, 1980
- Designated NYCL: March 15, 1966

Kings County Savings Bank is a former bank building at 135 Broadway in the Williamsburg neighborhood of Brooklyn in New York City. It is an example of French Second Empire-style architecture. Construction of the building began in 1860, to designs of William H. Willcox of Brooklyn, in partnership with prominent New York architect Gamaliel King, working as King & Willcox. The structure was continuously occupied by banks until the 1990s. The Williamsburg Art & Historical Center has operated the building since 1996.

The building became a New York City designated landmark in 1966 and was added to the National Register of Historic Places in 1980.

== Architecture ==
The Kings County Savings Bank building was built between 1860 and 1867. It is 43.5 by 81 feet (13.3 by 24.7 m) on the outside dimension and is constructed of Dorchester sandstone. It has three main floors, each a single large room. On the first and second floors, the main rooms contain six tall Corinthian columns, formed of cast iron, while the third floor is entirely open. The first floor retains its massive gas chandeliers and ornately carved woodwork.

Although the designer of the bank, King's partner William H. Willcox, is relatively unknown, the building is a superb example of the French Second Empire style. For example, the building displays the characteristic mansard roof, which conceals the fourth story attic.

== History ==
The Kings County Savings Institution was chartered on April 10, 1860. It carried out business in a building called Washington Hall until it purchased the lot on the corner of Bedford Avenue and Broadway and erected a permanent home.

The Kings County Savings Bank has long been considered a landmark of Williamsburg. By 1900, during the construction of the Williamsburg Bridge, the neighborhood had changed, and the Bank building was already seen as an icon of "old Williamsburg." It remains one of the most important historical landmarks in Williamsburg, and was recognized by the New York City Landmarks Preservation Commission in 1966, the seventh building to be so designated. It was placed on the National Register of Historic Places in 1980.

"The Kings County Savings Bank is an outstanding example of French Second Empire architecture, displaying a wealth of ornament and diverse architectural elements. A business building of imposing grandeur, the Kings County Savings Bank "represents a period of conspicuous display in which it was not considered vulgar, at least by the people in power, to boast openly of one's wealth. From its scale and general character there is nothing, on the outside, that would distinguish the Kings County Savings Bank from a millionaires mansion." (from History Preserved: New York City Landmarks & Historic Districts, Harmon H. Gladstone & Martha Dalyrmple, Simon & Schuster, 1974).

The building remained in continuous bank ownership and use for well over a century. It ceased to be used as a bank in the 1980s.

== Bank timeline ==
From the public records:

- April 10, 1860 – New York State chartered Kings County Savings Bank
- December 31, 1968 – merge with State Union Square Savings Bank, name changed to United Mutual Savings Bank
- September 24, 1982 – merge with State American Savings Bank
- July 29, 1983 – converted to Federal American Savings Bank, F.S.B.
- December 29, 1989 – convert to State American Savings Bank
- June 12, 1992 – LID Sold To Ridgewood Savings Bank
- October 20, 1995 – liquidated

== Williamsburg Art & Historical Center ==
Currently the building houses the Williamsburg Art & Historical Center, a not-for profit art organization founded by artist Yuko Nii in October 1996. The Center presents art exhibitions, performances and cultural events as well as lectures, seminars and educational programs of both local and international interest. It also preserves and displays historical art and artifacts.

On July 31, 2008, John B. Manbeck, the official Brooklyn Borough Historian from 1993 to 2002, said in an article in the Brooklyn Eagle:

Art in Williamsburg has made great strides. In fact, all Williamsburg has progressed, undoubtedly because of its attraction to artists. Much of the credit must be placed on the doorstep of the director of the Williamsburg Art & Historical Center, Yuko Nii. The center operates out of the former Kings County Savings Bank Building (1867) and celebrated an infusion of a $500,000 capital funding grant from the city.

In 2009 ownership of the building was transferred to the Yuko Nii Foundation.

== See also ==
- List of New York City Designated Landmarks in Brooklyn
- National Register of Historic Places listings in Brooklyn
